= Kristen Walsh Bellows =

American racquetball player

Personal information
- Nationality: American
- Born: May 5, 1982 (age 44)

Sport
- Sport: Racquetball
- College team: Utah
- Turned pro: 2001
- Retired: 2012

Achievements and titles
- Highest world ranking: 4th (2005-06, 2008-09)
Medal record
Women's Racquetball
Representing United States
Pan Am Championships
Silver medal – second place	2006 Guatemala City, Guatemala	Singles
Gold medal – first place	2005 Caracas, Venezuela	Singles
Silver medal – second place	2005 Caracas, Venezuela	Doubles
Bronze medal – third place	2004 Cuenca, Ecuador	Doubles

Kristen Walsh Bellows (nee Walsh, May 5, 1982) is a retired American racquetball player. She represented the USA on four occasions, winning gold in Women's Singles at the 2005 Pan American Championships. On the women's professional racquetball tour, Walsh Bellows won once, and was twice ranked 4th in the season ending rankings. She was also a five-time USA Racquetball (USAR) collegiate champion (three singles and two doubles titles).

== 1995-2001 - Junior years ==
Walsh Bellows won her 1st USA Junior title in the Girl’s U12 division in 1995, when she won both singles and doubles with Jesi Fuller. She also played at the International Racquetball Federation (IRF) World Junior Championships that year, when she and Fuller won Girls U12 Doubles.

In 1996, Walsh Bellows and Fuller won Girls U14 Doubles in both the USA Junior Championships and the IRF World Junior Championships. She also won Girls U14 Singles at World Juniors, but not in the USA.

Walsh Bellows played doubles with Krystal Csuk in 1998, when they won Girls U16 Doubles at the IRF World Junior Championships.

Walsh Bellows’s most successful junior years were her last three seasons, as she won both singles and doubles with Csuk in both 1999 and 2000 at the USA Junior Championships and the IRF World Junior Championships. She won Girls U16 in 1999 and U18 in 2000. In 2001, she won Girls U18 Singles in the USA and IRF junior championships.

In 2000, at 18, Walsh Bellows played in the US National Singles Championships, reaching the quarterfinals, where she lost to Jackie Paraiso. Later that year, she played in the US National Doubles Championships with Rhonda Rajsich, and they lost to Kim Russell and Kersten Hallander in the quarterfinals.

Walsh Bellows played in the US National Singles Championships in 2001, when she lost a tie-breaker, 11-7, to Jackie Paraiso in the Round of 16.

== 2001-2003 - Career begins ==
As Walsh Bellows aged out of juniors, she turned her focus to the women's pro racquetball tour. She played four times in the 2000-01 season, making the quarterfinals once and finishing ranked 14th.

As a college freshman, Walsh Bellows won Women’s Singles and Women's Doubles at the 2001 USAR Intercollegiate Championship for Baldwin-Wallace College. She won Women’s Doubles with Elle Summers.

In the 2001 US National Doubles Championships, Walsh Bellows played with Janel Tisinger, and they upset veterans Laura Fenton and Jackie Paraiso Rice in the quarterfinals, 3-15, 15-14, 11-6. In the semi-finals, they were up 9-1 in the tie-breaker against Malia Bailey and Rhonda Rajsich, but Bailey and Rajsich came back with ten straight points to win the breaker, 11-9, and advance to the final.

Walsh Bellows began the 2001-02 season with a bang by reaching the final in Charlotte, North Carolina. Walsh Bellows beat Rhonda Rajsich in the Round of 16, Susana Acosta in the quarterfinals, and Claudine Garcia in the semi-finals, but lost to Cheryl Gudinas in the final, 15-11, 15-8, 15-12. But it was her first pro final in only her 6th event on tour. Later that season, Walsh Bellows made her 2nd final in San Diego, where she beat Jackie Paraiso in the quarterfinals and Kerri Wachtel in the semi-finals, before losing to Gudinas in the final, although in the final, Walsh Bellows did come back from two games down to force a 5th game tie-breaker before losing, 15-11, 15-8, 14-16, 9-15, 15-9. Those finals helped Walsh Bellows finish 6th in the rankings that season.

At the 2002 US National Singles Championships, Walsh Bellows lost to Jackie Paraiso (then Jackie Rice), 15-6, 15-8, in the quarterfinals, which was the 3rd year running she’d lost to Parasio at National Singles.

Walsh Bellows transferred from Baldwin-Wallace College to the University of Utah for the 2001-2002 academic year, so she played for Utah at the 2002 Intercollegiate Championships. She had a chance to defend her singles title, as she reached the Women’s Singles final for a second consecutive year, but lost to Krystal Csuk, 15-1, 4-15, 11-9.

In the 2002 US National Doubles Championships, Walsh Bellows played with Cheryl Gudinas, but they were upset by the veteran team of Mary Lyons and Susan Pfahler in the quarterfinals, 15-14, 15-14.

In 2003, Walsh Bellows won Women’s Singles at the USAR Intercollegiate Championships for a second time, as she defeated Krystal Csuk in the final, 15-8, 15-0, to claim her 2nd title in three years.

At the 2003 US National Singles Championships, Walsh Bellows lost to Cheryl Gudinas in the quarterfinals, 15-7, 15-5.

In the 2002-03 pro season, Walsh Bellows didn’t make it past the quarterfinals in any of the eleven events she played, but she was ranked 8th at the end of the season, so maintained her top 10 ranking.

In the 2003 US National Doubles Championships, Walsh Bellows played with Cheryl Gudinas for a second year, and they faced the team that upset them last year: veterans Mary Lyons and Susan Pfahler in the quarterfinals, but this year Walsh Bellows and Gudinas came out on top, winning 15-11, 10-15, 11-7. In the semi-finals, they lost to 2nd seeds Kersten Hallander and Janel Tisinger, 15-8, 15-13.

The 2003-04 and 2004-05 pro seasons were similar for Walsh Bellows. In 2003-04, she played all 9 events on tour, and was in five semi-finals, but no finals, and was a then career best 5th in the season ending ranking. In 2004-05, Walsh Bellows she was in four semi-finals over six events and was again 5th at the end of the season.

== 2004-2007 - Team USA appearances ==
But 2004 was a significant year for Walsh Bellows. She won Women’s Singles and Doubles at the USAR Intercollegiate Championships, defeating Adrienne Fisher in singles final, 4-15, 15-10, 11-3, and teaming up with her mother Marianne Walsh, who had gone back to university as a mature student. They beat Fisher and Da'Monique Davis in the doubles final, 15-12, 12-15, 11-1, which helped carry the University of Utah to the Women’s Team title.

Also in 2004, Walsh Bellows played on the US National Team for the first time at the Pan American Championships in Cuenca, Ecuador. In Women’s Singles, she lost in the quarterfinals to Canadian Lori-Jane Powell, 15-2, 12-15, 11-10. She also played Women’s Doubles with Kersten Hallander in Cuenca, and they lost in the semi-finals to Canadians Josée Grand'Maître and Jennifer Saunders, 12-15, 15-10, 11-4. Thus, Walsh Bellows came home with a bronze medal for the USA in doubles.

At the 2004 US National Singles Championships, Walsh Bellows defeated Kerri Wachtel in the quarterfinals, 15-11, 15-13, and then lost to Cheryl Gudinas in the semi-finals, 15-9, 15-2. “Cheryl didn’t really miss any shot today, so you have to give her credit,” Walsh said, “But I wasn’t hitting my shot, moving well, or serving well, so it was lopsided.”

In the 2004 US National Doubles Championships, Walsh Bellows played with Cheryl Gudinas for a third year. They defeated veterans Mary Lyons and Susan Pfahler in the quarterfinals, winning 15-4, 15-4. Walsh Bellows and Gudinas advanced to the final with a semi-final win over Kersten Hallander and Janel Tisinger, 15-7, 4-15, 11-3. In the final, they won the first game against Jackie Paraiso and Kim Russell, but lost the match in three games, 13-15, 15-9, 11-7.

Walsh Bellow’s 2nd appearance on Team USA was at the 2005 Pan American Championships in Caracas, Venezuela, where she played both Women’s Singles and Women’s Doubles, teaming up with Cheryl Gudinas. The two US women faced off in the singles final, with Walsh Bellows coming out on top, 15-8, 8-15, 11-8. They reached the doubles final, but lost to Mexicans Susana Acosta and Rosy Torres, 15-12, 15-12.

At the 2005 US National Singles Championships, Walsh Bellows finished 3rd, as she lost to Cheryl Gudinas in the semi-finals, and then defeated Tammy Brown in the 3rd place match.

In the 2005 US National Doubles Championships, Walsh Bellows played with Cheryl Gudinas for a fourth year. They finished 4th after reaching the semi-finals, but then losing the third place match to Rhonda Rajsich and Janel Tisinger.

She was in her 3rd career pro final in the 2005-06 season. In Greensboro, North Carolina, she defeated Diane Moore in the quarterfinals and Rhonda Rajsich in the semi-finals. Walsh Bellows faced Cheryl Gudinas in the final, and lost in three games, 12-10, 11-5, 11-2. That result, along with four other semi-finals that season, help her reach a career high 4th ranking at season’s end.

At the 2006 US National Singles Championships, Walsh Bellows finished 4th, as she lost the 3rd place match to Tammy Brown.

Walsh Bellows played Women’s Singles at the 2007 Pan American Championships in Santiago, Chile, which was her 4th consecutive appearance on Team USA at the Pan Am Championships. Walsh Bellows lost in the quarterfinals to Chile's Angela Grisar, 15-9, 15-11, so she failed to make the podium.

At the 2007 US National Singles Championships, Walsh Bellows was upset by Liz Alvarado in the quarterfinals, 15-3, 15-2.

Walsh Bellows only reached one semi-final in the 2006-07 pro season, and her ranking slipped to 7th.

== 2008-2012 - Pro win and career concludes ==
But in 2007-08, she made her 4th pro final. In Burlington, Ontario, Walsh Bellows beat Cheryl Gudinas in the quarterfinals and Kerri Wachtel in the semi-finals before losing to Christie Van Hees in the final, 11-6, 11-6, 11-4. That result helped her finish 5th in the season ending rankings.

In the 2007 US National Doubles Championships, Walsh Bellows played with Kim Russell Waselenchuk, and they reached the finals with a semi-final win over Rhonda Rajsich and Janel Tisinger, but lost the final to Jackie Paraiso and Aimee Ruiz.

In the 2008 US National Doubles Championships, Walsh Bellows played with Kim Russell Waselenchuk for a second time, and they lost in the semi-finals to Rhonda Rajsich and Janel Tisinger.

At the 2008 US National Singles Championships, Walsh Bellows upset defending champion Rhonda Rajsich, 15-14, 15-6 in the semi-finals, to reach the final for the first time. But she lost the final to Cheryl Gudinas, 15-2, 15-5.

In the 2009 US National Doubles Championships, Walsh Bellows played with Kim Russell Waselenchuk for a third time, and for a second year they lost in the semi-finals to Rhonda Rajsich and Janel Tisinger, 15-4, 15-12.

Walsh Bellows got into the winner’s column on the pro tour with the last event of the 2008-09 season. In May 2009, at the Ektelon World Championships in Stockton, California, she defeated Samantha Salas in the Round of 16, Kerri Wachtel in the quarterfinals, Rhonda Rajsich in the semi-finals, and in the final beat Paola Longoria, 12-10, 11-5, 7-11, 7-11, 11-7. The win helped her match her career best ranking of #4 at the end of the season.

Despite that success, Walsh Bellows played fewer than half the events over the next two seasons, and dropped out of the top 10 for the first time since 2002. She returned to the tour in 2011-12, playing six of the eight events, and reaching two semi-finals, which put her back in the top 10 at 9th at season’s end. But that was the last full season she played on tour.

At the 2009 US National Singles Championships, Walsh Bellows was seeded 2nd, but lost in the quarterfinals to eventual champion Aimee Ruiz, 15-12, 15-12.

After not playing in 2010, Walsh Bellows teamed up with Janel Tisinger for the 2011 US National Doubles Championships, and they lost to sisters Michelle Key and Danielle Key, 15-11, 15-10, in the quarterfinals.

In 2012, Walsh Bellows played both singles and doubles USAR championships. In February, at the 2012 US National Doubles Championships, Walsh Bellows played with Janel Tisinger for a second time, and they lost to Rhonda Rajsich and Kim Russell-Waselenchuk, 15-9, 15-4, in the quarterfinals. Then in May, at the 2012 National Singles, Bellows lost to Rhonda Rajsich, 15-11, 15-4, in the semi-finals.

== Career summary ==
Overall, Walsh Bellows played 89 times on the Ladies Professional Racquetball Tour, reaching the finals five times and winning once. She played for Team USA four times and earned four medals, including gold at the 2005 Pan American Championships. She won five titles at the USA Racquetball Intercollegiate Championships (three singles and two doubles), but didn't win US National Singles or Doubles.

=== Career record ===
This table lists Walsh Bellows's results in annual events.

Player	2000	2001	2002	2003	2004	2005	2006	2007	2008	2009	2010	2011	2012
US National Singles	16	16	16	SF	SF	SF	QF	QF	SF	QF	-	QF	32
US National Doubles	QF	SF	QF	SF	F	SF	?	F	SF	SF	-	QF	QF
US Open	16	16	16	SF	SF	SF	QF	QF	SF	QF	-	QF	32
LPRT Rank	-	14	6	8	5	5	4	7	5	4	12	37	9

Note: W = winner, F = finalist, SF = semi-finalist, QF = quarterfinalist, 16 = Round of 16.
