= US Open Racquetball Championships =

The UnitedHealthcare US Open Racquetball Championships is the premier professional racquetball event. It is a Grand Slam event with men and women competing from the International Racquetball Tour and Ladies Professional Racquetball Tour, respectively. Beginning in 2014, the US Open added a pro doubles division. The US Open also has divisions for amateur players, and hundreds of people participate each year. Overall, there were 708 participants in 2021, and 732 participants in 2019.

The 2021 UnitedHealthcare US Open was October 6–10 in Minneapolis, which was the 11th year since the event began in 1996 that it was in the Twin Cities. UnitedHealthcare was the title sponsor for the ninth consecutive year.

The first 14 years the tournament were held in Memphis, Tennessee. Hosted by USA Racquetball the US Open was held in mid-November for the first 12 years, but in 2008 the event was moved up a month to October.

Doug Ganim, a multiple racquetball World Champion in Men's Doubles and former pro player on the International Racquetball Tour, was the US Open's Tournament Director for its first 25 years, but he retired from the position in 2021.

== Men's pro competition ==
=== Men's champions ===
Year	Champion	Runner-up	Semifinalists	Quarterfinalists	Doubles Champions	Finalists
2022	(Bolivia) Conrrado Moscoso; 15-8, 15–4	(Mexico) Rodrigo Montoya	(Mexico) Andree Parrilla (United States) Alejandro Landa	(Canada) Samuel Murray (United States) Jake Bredenbeck (United States) Rocky Carson (Mexico) Eduardo Portillo	(Mexico) Álvaro Beltrán (Mexico) Daniel De La Rosa; 14-15, 15–10, 11-4	(United States) Jake Bredenbeck (United States) Sam Bredenbeck
2021	(Mexico) Daniel De La Rosa; 15–13, 11–15, 11–3	(Bolivia) Carlos Keller	(Mexico) Andree Parrilla (Canada) Kane Waselenchuk	(Mexico) Eduardo Portillo (Canada) Samuel Murray (United States) Alejandro Landa (United States) Rocky Carson	(Mexico) Álvaro Beltrán (Mexico) Daniel De La Rosa; 15–11, 15–11	(Mexico) Alejandro Landa (Canada) Samuel Murray
2019	(Canada) Kane Waselenchuk; 15-12, 15–7	(Bolivia) Conrrado Moscoso	(Mexico) Alejandro Landa (Mexico) Daniel De La Rosa	(Mexico) Javier Mar (Mexico) Sebastian Fernandez (Mexico) Álvaro Beltrán (Mexico) Andree Parrilla	(Canada) Kane Waselenchuk (United States) Ben Croft; 15–11, 15–8	(Mexico) Álvaro Beltrán (Mexico) Daniel De La Rosa
2018	(Canada) Kane Waselenchuk; 15-11, 15–6	(Mexico) Daniel De La Rosa	(Mexico) Andree Parrilla (United States) Rocky Carson	(Colombia) Sebastian Franco (United States) Jose Diaz (Mexico) Alejandro Landa (Colombia) Mario Mercado	(Mexico) Álvaro Beltrán (Mexico) Daniel De La Rosa; 15–11, 15–6	(Canada) Kane Waselenchuk (United States) Ben Croft
2017	(Canada) Kane Waselenchuk; 11–6, 11–4, 8–11, 11–4	(United States) Rocky Carson	(Mexico) Álvaro Beltrán (Mexico) Alejandro Landa	(Bolivia) Conrrado Moscoso (Mexico) Javier Mar (United States) Sudsy Monchik (Mexico) Daniel De La Rosa	(Canada) Kane Waselenchuk (United States) Ben Croft; 15–10, 10–15, 11–7	(Mexico) Álvaro Beltrán (Mexico) Daniel De La Rosa
2016	(Canada) Kane Waselenchuk; 11–2, 11–2, 11–6	(United States) Rocky Carson	(United States) Jose Rojas (Mexico) Daniel De La Rosa	(Colombia) Sebastian Franco (United States) Marco Rojas (Mexico) Álvaro Beltrán (United States) Jake Bredenbeck	(United States) Jose Rojas (United States) Marco Rojas; 15–10, 15–5	(Mexico) Daniel De La Rosa (Mexico) Edson Martinez
2015	(Canada) Kane Waselenchuk; 11–5, 11–8, 11–3	(Mexico) Daniel De La Rosa	(Mexico) Álvaro Beltrán (United States) Rocky Carson	(United States) Jansen Allen (United States) Jose Rojas (United States) Anthony Herrera (United States) Marco Rojas	(Canada) Kane Waselenchuk (United States) Ben Croft; 15–0, 15–5	(United States) Jake Bredenbeck (United States) Jose Diaz
2014	(Canada) Kane Waselenchuk; 11–6, 11–1, 11–6	(Mexico) Álvaro Beltrán	(Mexico) Alejandro Landa (United States) Rocky Carson	(United States) Tony Carson (Mexico) Daniel De La Rosa (United States) Chris Crowther (United States) Ben Croft	(Canada) Kane Waselenchuk (United States) Ben Croft; 9–15, 15–8, 11–5	(Mexico) Álvaro Beltrán (United States) Rocky Carson
2013	(Canada) Kane Waselenchuk; 11–9, 11–1, 11–6	(United States) Rocky Carson	(United States) Ben Croft (Mexico) Álvaro Beltrán	(Mexico) Daniel De La Rosa (United States) Jose Rojas (United States) Chris Crowther (United States) Tony Carson		
2012	(Canada) Kane Waselenchuk; 11–8, 11–5, 11–5	(United States) Rocky Carson	(Mexico) Álvaro Beltrán (United States) Chris Crowther	(United States) Tony Carson (United States) Alex Ackermann (Mexico) Daniel De La Rosa (United States) Shane Vanderson		
2011	(Canada) Kane Waselenchuk; 7–11, 11–2, 11–4, 11–7	(United States) Rocky Carson	(United States) Jose Rojas (United States) Chris Crowther	(United States) Charlie Pratt (United States) Andy Hawthorne (United States) Ben Croft (United States) Shane Vanderson		
2010	(Canada) Kane Waselenchuk; 10–12, 11–2, 11–2, 11–6	(Mexico) Álvaro Beltrán	(United States) Jack Huczek (United States) Ben Croft	(United States) Andy Hawthorne (United States) Charlie Pratt (United States) Mitch Williams (United States) Jose Rojas		
2009	(Canada) Kane Waselenchuk; 12–10, 11–1, 11–3	(United States) Jack Huczek	(United States) Jason Mannino (United States) Ben Croft	(United States) Jose Rojas (United States) Shane Vanderson (United States) Chris Crowther (United States) Rocky Carson		
2008	(Canada) Kane Waselenchuk; 11–2, 11–2, 11–4	(United States) Rocky Carson	(United States) Jack Huczek (United States) Shane Vanderson	(Mexico) Álvaro Beltrán (United States) Jason Thoerner (United States) Ben Croft (United States) Jason Mannino		
2007	(United States) Rocky Carson; 11–3, 7–11, 11–8, 11–5	(United States) Jack Huczek	(United States) Jason Mannino (United States) Shane Vanderson	(United States) Andy Hawthorne (United States) Jason Thoerner (United States) Mitch Williams (Mexico) Álvaro Beltrán		
2006	(United States) Jason Mannino; 11–9, 11–8, 11–5	(United States) Rocky Carson	(United States) Jack Huczek (United States) Shane Vanderson	(United States) Cliff Swain (United States) Andy Hawthorne (United States) Mitch Williams (Mexico) Álvaro Beltrán		
2005	(Canada) Kane Waselenchuk; 11–5, 12–10, 12–10	(United States) Cliff Swain	(United States) Rocky Carson (United States) Jack Huczek	(Mexico) Polo Gutierrez (Mexico) Álvaro Beltrán (United States) Jason Mannino (United States) Shane Vanderson		
2004	(Canada) Kane Waselenchuk; 11–1, 11–3, 11–0	(United States) Cliff Swain	(United States) Rocky Carson (United States) Jack Huczek	(United States) Mike Guidry (United States) Jason Mannino (United States) Kyle Veenstra (United States) Derek Robinson		
2003	(Canada) Kane Waselenchuk; 11–8, 11–6, 11–6	(United States) Derek Robinson	(United States) Jack Huczek (United States) Shane Vanderson	(United States) Jason Mannino (United States) Chris Crowther (United States) Sudsy Monchik (Canada) Mike Green		
2002	(United States) Sudsy Monchik; 12–10, 12–10, 11–7	(United States) Cliff Swain	(United States) Jack Huczek (Canada) Kane Waselenchuk	(Mexico) Álvaro Beltrán (United States) Rocky Carson (United States) John Ellis (United States) Jason Mannino		
2001	(United States) Cliff Swain; 11–5, 7–11, 12–10, 11–4	(United States) John Ellis	(United States) Mike Guidry (United States) Jason Mannino	(United States) Ruben Gonzalez (Canada) Kane Waselenchuk (Mexico) Álvaro Beltrán (United States) Rocky Carson		
2000	(United States) Sudsy Monchik; 11–8, 11–9, 9–11 11–3	(United States) Cliff Swain	(Mexico) Álvaro Beltrán (United States) Mike Locker	(United States) Rocky Carson (United States) Derek Robinson (Canada) Kane Waselenchuk (United States) John Ellis		
1999	(United States) Jason Mannino; 11-8, 4–11, 11–8, 11–8	(United States) Cliff Swain	(United States) John Ellis (United States) Sudsy Monchik	(United States) Dan Fowler (United States) Rocky Carson (United States) Adam Karp (United States) Ruben Gonzalez		
1998	(United States) Sudsy Monchik; 11-2, 11–8, 11–4	(United States) Cliff Swain	(United States) John Ellis (United States) Eric Muller	(United States) Mike Ray (United States) Mike Guidry (United States) Tim Doyle (United States) Derek Robinson		
1997	(United States) Cliff Swain; 11-6, 11–2, 11–3	(United States) Sudsy Monchik	(United States) Andy Roberts (United States) John Ellis	(United States) Jason Mannino (United States) Adam Karp (United States) Woody Clouse (United States) Eric Muller		
1996	(United States) Sudsy Monchik; 11-8, 11–9, 11–3	(United States) Andy Roberts	(United States) Cliff Swain (United States) Woody Clouse	(United States) Drew Kachtik (United States) Mike Ray (United States) Mike Guidry (United States) John Ellis		

=== US Open Men's Finalists by wins and losses ===
Finalist	Wins	Losses
(Canada) Kane Waselenchuk	15	0
(United States) Sudsy Monchik	4	1
(United States) Cliff Swain	2	6
(United States) Jason Mannino	2	0
(Bolivia) Conrrado Moscoso	1	1
(United States) Rocky Carson	1	7
(Mexico) Daniel De La Rosa	1	2
(Mexico) Álvaro Beltrán	0	2
(United States) Jack Huczek	0	2
(Mexico) Rodrigo Montoya	0	1
(Bolivia) Carlos Keller	0	1
(United States) John Ellis	0	1
(United States) Andy Roberts	0	1
(United States) Derek Robinson	0	1

=== Men career records ===
This table lists all players who have been US Open semi-finalists with their result for each year they competed. Note: W = winner, F = finalist, SF = semi-finalist, QF = quarterfinalist, 16 = Round of 16, 32 = Round of 32, 64 = Round of 64, 128 = Round of 128.

Player	1996	1997	1998	1999	2000	2001	2002	2003	2004	2005	2006	2007	2008	2009	2010	2011	2012	2013	2014	2015	2016	2017	2018	2019	2021	2022
(Canada) Kane Waselenchuk					QF	QF	SF	W	W	W			W	W	W	W	W	W	W	W	W	W	W	W	SF	
(United States) Rocky Carson	32		16	QF	QF	QF	QF	16	SF	SF	F	W	F	QF	16	F	F	F	SF	SF	F	F	SF	16	QF	QF
(United States) Jason Mannino	16	QF	16	W	32	SF	QF	QF	QF	QF	W	SF	QF	SF												
(United States) Sudsy Monchik	W	F	W	SF	W		W	QF			16											QF				
(United States) Cliff Swain	SF	W	F	F	F	W	F	16	F	F	QF		32	32	32	64		16	16	64	32				64	
(Mexico) Daniel De La Rosa													64	64	32	16	QF	QF	QF	F	SF	QF	F	SF	W	16
(Bolivia) Conrrado Moscoso																						QF	32	F	16	W
(United States) Jack Huczek				64	16	16	SF	SF	SF	SF	SF	F	SF	F	SF											16
(Mexico) Álvaro Beltrán					SF	QF	QF	16	16	QF	QF	QF	QF		F	16	SF	SF	F	SF	QF	SF	16	QF	16	32
(United States) John Ellis	QF	SF	SF	SF	QF	F	QF	16		32	32	16														
(United States) Andy Roberts	F	SF	32	32																						
(United States) Derek Robinson	64	16	QF	16	QF	16	16	F	QF																	
(Bolivia) Carlos Keller														32		32						32		16	F	16
(United States) Shane Vanderson	64			64		64	32	SF	32	QF	SF	SF	SF	QF		QF	QF									
(United States) Alejandro Landa									64	64	64	32	32	16	16	16	16	16	SF	32	16	SF	QF	SF	QF	QF
(United States) Ben Croft							32	32	16	16	16	16	QF	SF	SF	QF	32	SF	QF	16						
(United States) Chris Crowther						16	32	QF	32	64	16	16	16	QF	16	SF	SF	QF	QF	16						
(United States) Jose Rojas													32	QF	QF	SF	16	QF	16	QF	SF					
(Mexico) Andree Parrilla																	128	32	32	32	16	16	SF	QF	SF	SF
(United States) Mike Guidry	QF	16	QF	16	16	SF	16	16	QF	16																
(United States) Woody Clouse	SF	QF				16				16	16															
(United States) Eric Muller		QF	SF												64											
(United States) Mike Locker	32	32	16		SF	16																				

== Women's pro competition ==
=== Women's Champions ===
Year	Champion	Runner-up	Semifinalists	Quarterfinalists	Doubles Champions	Finalists
2022	(Mexico) Paola Longoria; 13-15, 15–5, 11–3	(United States) Erika Manilla	(Mexico) Jessica Parrilla (Mexico) Alejandra Herrera	(Colombia) Brenda Laime (Bolivia) Angélica Barrios (Argentina) Natalia Mendez (Chile) Carla Muñoz	(United States) Erika Manilla (Argentina) Natalia Mendez; 15-14, 7–15, 11-4	(Mexico) Paola Longoria (Mexico) Samantha Salas
2021	(Mexico) Paola Longoria; 15-3, 15–8	(Argentina) María José Vargas	(United States) Erika Manilla (Bolivia) Angélica Barrios	(Mexico) Jessica Parrilla (United States) Rhonda Rajsich (Guatemala) Gabriela Martinez (Colombia) Brenda Laime	(Mexico) Paola Longoria (Mexico) Samantha Salas; 3-15, 15–11, 11–6	(Mexico) Montserrat Mejia (Mexico) Alexandra Herrera
2019	(Mexico) Paola Longoria; 15-5, 15–7	(Argentina) María José Vargas	(Mexico) Montserrat Mejia (Mexico) Samantha Salas	(Bolivia) Masiel Rivera (Argentina) Natalia Mendez (Mexico) Alexandra Herrera (Mexico) Nancy Enriquez	(Mexico) Montserrat Mejia (Mexico) Alexandra Herrera; 15-13, 15–12	(Mexico) Paola Longoria (Mexico) Samantha Salas
2018	(Mexico) Paola Longoria; 11-9, 11–2, 11–5	(Mexico) Samantha Salas	(Guatemala) Gabriela Martinez (Canada) Frédérique Lambert	(Argentina) Natalia Mendez (United States) Rhonda Rajsich (Mexico) Alexandra Herrera (Bolivia) Yazmine Sabja	(Mexico) Paola Longoria (Mexico) Samantha Salas; 15-11, 15–14	(Mexico) Montserrat Mejia (Mexico) Alexandra Herrera
2017	(Mexico) Paola Longoria; 11-7, 11–4, 2–11, 11–3	(Canada) Frédérique Lambert	(United States) Rhonda Rajsich (Argentina) Natalia Mendez	(Colombia) Adriana Riveros (Colombia) Cristina Amaya (Mexico) Alexandra Herrera (Mexico) Jessica Parrilla	(Mexico) Paola Longoria (Guatemala) Gabriela Martinez; 15-5, 15–8	(Colombia) Cristina Amaya (Colombia) Adriana Riveros
2016	(Mexico) Paola Longoria; 11-3, 11–7, 11–3	(Mexico) Samantha Salas	(Mexico) Jessica Parrilla (Canada) Frédérique Lambert	(Mexico) Susana Acosta (United States) Rhonda Rajsich (Argentina) Natalia Mendez (Colombia) Cristina Amaya	(Mexico) Paola Longoria (Mexico) Samantha Salas; 15-10, 15–0	(Canada) Frédérique Lambert (Ecuador) Veronica Sotomayor
2015	(Mexico) Paola Longoria; 11-7, 11–5, 9–11, 11–9	(United States) Rhonda Rajsich	(Ecuador) Veronica Sotomayor (Argentina) María José Vargas	(Mexico) Sofia Rascon (Mexico) Samantha Salas (Canada) Frédérique Lambert (United States) Michelle Key	(Mexico) Paola Longoria (Mexico) Samantha Salas; 15-10, 15–2	(Mexico) Montserrat Mejia (Mexico) Alexandra Herrera
2014	(Mexico) Paola Longoria; 11-5, 11–3, 11–8	(Argentina) María José Vargas	(Colombia) Cristina Amaya (United States) Rhonda Rajsich	(Mexico) Diana Aguilar (Mexico) Sofia Rascon (Canada) Frédérique Lambert (Ecuador) Veronica Sotomayor	(Mexico) Paola Longoria (Ecuador) Veronica Sotomayor; 15-7, 12–15, 11–7	(United States) Rhonda Rajsich (Argentina) María José Vargas
2013	(Mexico) Paola Longoria; 11-4, 11–1, 11–7	(United States) Rhonda Rajsich	(Mexico) Samantha Salas (Mexico) Susana Acosta	(Ecuador) Veronica Sotomayor (United States) Adrienne Haynes (Colombia) Cristina Amaya (United States) Janel Tisinger		
2012	(Mexico) Paola Longoria; 11-4, 11–7, 12–10	(United States) Rhonda Rajsich	(Ecuador) Veronica Sotomayor (Mexico) Samantha Salas	(Ecuador) Maria Paz Muñoz (Mexico) Susana Acosta (United States) Krystal Csuk (United States) Jackie Paraiso		
2011	(Mexico) Paola Longoria; 11-7, 11–5, 11–9	(United States) Rhonda Rajsich	(Mexico) Samantha Salas (United States) Kerri Wachtel	(United States) Krystal Csuk (Canada) Jennifer Saunders (United States) Kristen Bellows (United States) Da'monique Davis		
2010	(United States) Rhonda Rajsich; 11-8, 8–11, 11–9, 11–5	(Mexico) Paola Longoria	(Canada) Christie Huczek (Mexico) Samantha Salas	(Mexico) Jessica Parrilla (United States) Aimee Ruiz (United States) Cheryl Gudinas (United States) Kerri Wachtel		
2009	(United States) Rhonda Rajsich; 1-11, 11–8, 11–3, 2–11, 11–7	(Mexico) Paola Longoria	(United States) Cheryl Gudinas (United States) Kerri Wachtel	(Chile) Angela Grisar (United States) Janel Tisinger (United States) Jackie Paraiso (United States) Kristen Bellows		
2008	(Mexico) Paola Longoria; 11-8, 7–11, 11–7, 11–7	(United States) Cheryl Gudinas	(United States) Brenda Kyzer (United States) Kristen Bellows	(United States) Kerri Wachtel (United States) Adrienne Fisher (United States) Rhonda Rajsich (Canada) Christie Van Hees		
2007	(United States) Rhonda Rajsich; 11-6, 11–5, 8–11, 11–9	(United States) Cheryl Gudinas	(Chile) Angela Grisar (Canada) Christie Van Hees	(Mexico) Paola Longoria (United States) Kristen Walsh (United States) Kerri Wachtel (United States) Brenda Kyzer		
2006	(Canada) Christie Van Hees; 11-3, 11–2, 11–2	(United States) Cheryl Gudinas	(United States) Brenda Kyzer (United States) Kerri Wachtel	(United States) Rhonda Rajsich (United States) Elaine Albrecht (United States) Kristen Walsh (Chile) Angela Grisar		
2005	(Canada) Christie Van Hees; 11-13, 11–4, 11–5, 11–4	(United States) Rhonda Rajsich	(United States) Kristen Walsh (United States) Laura Fenton	(United States) Diane Moore (United States) Tammy Brown (Chile) Angela Grisar (United States) Brenda Kyzer		
2004	(United States) Cheryl Gudinas; 11-8, 11–5, 8–11, 12–14, 11–3	(United States) Rhonda Rajsich	(United States) Kristen Walsh (Canada) Christie Van Hees	(Chile) Angela Grisar (Mexico) Paola Longoria (United States) Kerri Wachtel (United States) Tammy Brown		
2003	(United States) Rhonda Rajsich; 6-11, 11–7, 11–4, 11–7	(Canada) Christie Van Hees	(United States) Kristen Walsh (United States) Cheryl Gudinas	(Chile) Angela Grisar (United States) Tammy Brown (United States) Kerri Wachtel (Canada) Lori-Jane Powell		
2002	(United States) Cheryl Gudinas; 11-5, 11–5, 9–11, 11–6	(United States) Jackie Paraiso	(United States) Kerri Wachtel (United States) Laura Fenton	(United States) Kim Russell (United States) Adrienne Fisher (United States) Kersten Hallander (United States) Rhonda Rajsich		
2001	(United States) Kerri Wachtel; 15-13, 12–15, 15–11, 15–10	(United States) Jackie Paraiso	(United States) Cheryl Gudinas (United States) Kerseten Hallander	(United States) Laura Fenton (Dominican Republic) Claudine García (Canada) Lori-Jane Powell (United States) Kim Russell		
2000	(Canada) Christie Van Hees; 21-7, 21–12, 22–24, 21–11	(United States) Rhonda Rajsich	(United States) Cheryl Gudinas (United States) Jackie Paraiso	(United States) Chris Evon (United States) Kersten Hallander (United States) Laura Fenton (United States) Kim Machiran		
1999	(United States) Jackie Paraiso; 8-11, 13–11, 11–1, 5–11, 11–2	(Canada) Christie Van Hees	(Mexico) Susana Acosta (United States) Cheryl Gudinas	(United States) Janet Myers (United States) Kersten Hallander (Canada) Josée Grand'Maître (United States) Kim Machiran		
1998	(United States) Jackie Paraiso; 11-6, 11–5, 11–5	(Canada) Christie Van Hees	(United States) Robin Levine (United States) Caryn McKinney	(United States) Kersten Hallander (United States) Lydia Hammock (United States) Cheryl Gudinas (United States) Laura Fenton		
1997	(United States) Michelle Gould; 12-10, 11–5, 11–4	(United States) Jackie Paraiso	(United States) Marci Drexler (United States) Cheryl Gudinas	(United States) Randy Friedman (United States) Chris Evon (United States) Laura Fenton (United States) Caryn McKinney		
1996	(United States) Michelle Gould; 11-5, 11–4, 11–3	(United States) Cheryl Gudinas	(United States) Jackie Paraiso (United States) Caryn McKinney	(United States) Lynne Coburn (United States) Dina Moreland (United States) Robin Levine (United States) Molly O'Brien		

=== US Open Women's finalists by wins and losses ===
Finalist	Wins	Losses
(Mexico) Paola Longoria	12	2
(United States) Rhonda Rajsich	4	7
(Canada) Christie Van Hees	3	3
(United States) Michelle Gould	2	0
(United States) Cheryl Gudinas Holmes	2	4
(United States) Jackie Paraiso	2	3
(United States) Kerri Wachtel	1	0
(Argentina) María José Vargas	0	3
(Mexico) Samantha Salas	0	2
(United States) Erika Manilla	0	1
(Canada) Frédérique Lambert	0	1

=== Women career records ===
This table lists all players who have been US Open semi-finalists with their result for each year they competed. Note: W = winner, F = finalist, SF = semi-finalist, QF = quarterfinalist, 16 = Round of 16, 32 = Round of 32, 64 = Round of 64, 128 = Round of 128.

Player	1996	1997	1998	1999	2000	2001	2002	2003	2004	2005	2006	2007	2008	2009	2010	2011	2012	2013	2014	2015	2016	2017	2018	2019	2021	2022
(Mexico) Paola Longoria								128	QF	32	16	QF	W	F	F	W	W	W	W	W	W	W	W	W	W	W
(United States) Rhonda Rajsich					F	16	QF	W	F	F	QF	W	QF	W	W	F	F	F	SF	F	QF	SF	QF	16	QF	
(Canada) Christie Van Hees			F	F	W			F	SF	W	W	SF	QF		SF											
(United States) Cheryl Gudinas	F	SF	QF	SF	SF	SF	W	SF	W	16	F	F	F	SF	QF	16	16		16	32	64			32		
(United States) Kerri Wachtel	32				32	W	SF	QF	QF	16	SF	QF	QF	SF	QF	SF	32									
(United States) Jackie Paraiso	SF	F	W	W	SF	F	F							QF	16		QF	16								
(United States) Michelle Gould	W	W																								
(Mexico) Samantha Salas								128	32	16	16	16	16	32	SF	SF	SF	SF		QF	F		F	SF	16	16
(Canada) Frédérique Lambert												32	32	32	32	32		16	QF	QF	SF	F	SF	16		
(Argentina) María José Vargas																	32	16	F	SF		32	32	F	F	
(United States) Kristen Walsh Bellows					16	16	16	SF	SF	SF	QF	QF	SF	QF		QF	32									
(Mexico) Susana Acosta			16	SF	16	16	16	16	16	16	16	16	16	16	16	16	QF	SF	16	16	QF	32	32			
(Ecuador) Veronica Sotomayor												32	16				SF	QF	QF	SF	32				32	
(United States) Laura Fenton		QF	QF	16	QF	QF	SF	16	16	SF						32										
(United States) Brenda Kyzer						32	16	16	16	QF	SF	QF	SF													
(United States) Caryn McKinney	SF	QF	SF				16																			
(Chile) Angela Grisar								QF	QF	QF	QF	SF	16	QF	16											
(Colombia) Cristina Amaya												64	32	16	16	16	32	QF	SF	16	QF	QF	16	32	32	16
(Mexico) Jessica Parrilla													32	128	QF	16	16	16	16	16	SF	QF		32	QF	SF
(United States) Kersten Hallander			QF	QF	QF	SF	QF	16		16																
(United States) Robin Levine	QF		SF	16																						
(Argentina) Natalia Mendez																					QF	SF	QF	QF	16	QF
(Guatemala) Gabriela Martinez																				16	16	32	SF	16	QF	16
(Bolivia) Angélica Barrios																						32	32	32	SF	QF
(United States) Erika Manilla																				32	32	32	32		SF	F
(Mexico) Montserrat Mejia																				32	16	16	16	SF	32	
(Mexico) Alexandra Herrera																	32	32	16	32	32	QF	QF	QF	16	SF
(United States) Marci Drexler		SF																								
