= Josée Grand'Maître =

Canadian racquetball player

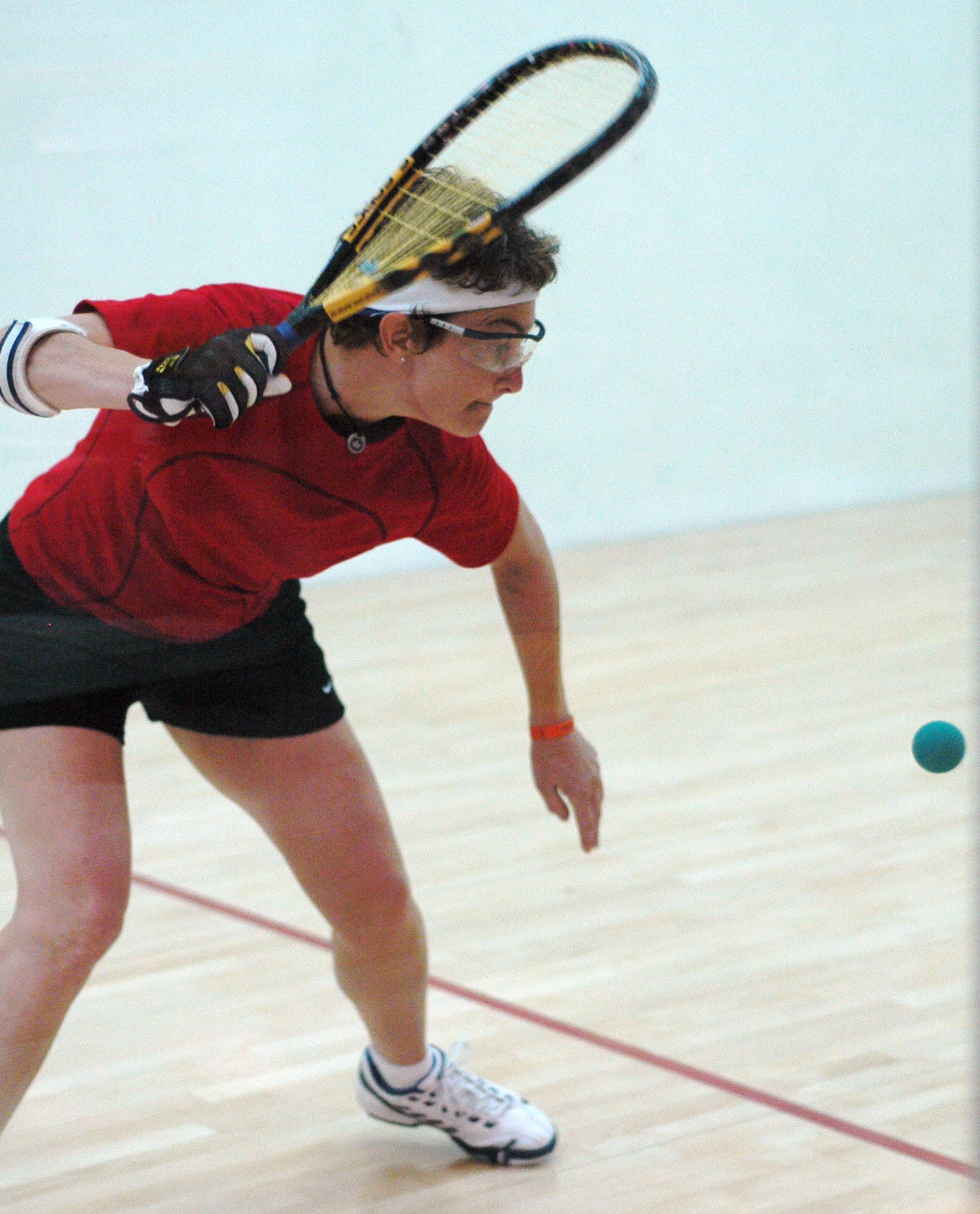
- Grand'Maître at 2006 Worlds

Personal information
- Nationality: Canadian
- Born: July 28, 1961 (age 65) Hull, Quebec
- Height: 164 cm (5 ft 5 in)
- Weight: 65 kg (143 lb)

Sport
- Sport: Racquetball

Achievements and titles
- National finals: 1st 1996, 1999, 2001 (singles), 1st 1990, 1993, 1994, 1998, 2001, 2003-2007, 2009, 2011-2014 (doubles)
Medal record
Women's Racquetball
Representing Canada
World Championships
Silver medal – second place	1988 Worlds	Doubles
Silver medal – second place	1990 Worlds	Doubles
Silver medal – second place	1992 Worlds	Doubles
Silver medal – second place	1998 Worlds	Doubles
Bronze medal – third place	2004 Worlds	Doubles
Bronze medal – third place	2006 Worlds	Doubles
Silver medal – second place	2006 Worlds	Team
Bronze medal – third place	2012 Worlds	Doubles
Bronze medal – third place	2012 Worlds	Team
Pan American Games
Bronze medal – third place	2003 Pan American Games	Doubles
Pan American Championships
Silver medal – second place	1994 Pan American Championships	Doubles
Silver medal – second place	1998 Pan American Championships	Doubles
Silver medal – second place	2001 Pan American Championships	Singles
Silver medal – second place	2002 Pan American Championships	Singles
Bronze medal – third place	1994 Pan American Championships	Singles
Bronze medal – third place	2003 Pan American Championships	Singles
Bronze medal – third place	2004 Pan American Championships	Doubles

Josée Grand'Maître (born July 28, 1961) is a Canadian retired racquetball player from Hull, Quebec (now Gatineau, Quebec). Grand'Maître won the Canadian Women's Singles title three times, and the Canadian Women's Doubles title 15 times. Her last title came in doubles in May 2014 with Jennifer Saunders as her partner. Grand'Maître's 15 doubles titles are the most ever, and her 18 combined titles place her third on the all time list behind Saunders (24) and Mike Green (21).

== Canadian career ==
Grand'Maître was Canadian Women's Singles Champion three times: in 1996, 1999, and 2001. Her first title in 1996 came over Christie Van Hees, while in 1999 Grand'Maître defeated Lucie Guillemette, who was also her doubles partner that year. In the 2001, she defeated Jennifer Saunders.

She was the Canadian Women's Doubles Champion on 15 occasions with six different playing partners. Grand'Maître's most successful partnership was with Jennifer Saunders, as they won ten titles together, including five consecutive titles from 2003 to 2007, as well as wins in 2009, and 2011 to 2014.

Grand'Maître's other five doubles titles were with five different partners. Her first title was in 1990 with Nadia Verilli, when they defeated Linda Ellerington and Lori Johnstone. In 1993, Grand'Maître teamed with Vicki Shanks to win the title over Johnstone and Debbie Ward. She won the next year with Carol McFetridge, as they beat Lucie Guillemette and Cindy MacTaggart. In 1998, Grand'Maître partnered with Guillemette to beat Shanks and Ward in the final. Finally, in the 2001 final Grand'Maître and Lori-Jane Powell defeated Amanda MacDonald and Karina Odegard to take the title.

== International career ==
Grand'Maître has competed for Canada on 37 occasions, which is the most by any Canadian racquetball player. She's earned two silver medals in singles. Her first was at the 2001 Pan American Championships (then Tournament of the Americas), when she defeated American Kersten Hallander in the semi-finals before losing to American Cheryl Gudinas in the final. The following year, Grand'Maître beat American Rhonda Rajsich in the semi-finals of the Pan American Championships only to lose to American Laura Fenton in the final.

Grand'Maître was a silver medalist in her first three appearances at the World Championships. She played doubles in each of those tournaments and reached the finals in 1988 with Nadia Verilli, 1990 and 1992 with Vicky Shanks (née Brown). She also reached the doubles final in 1998 with Debbie Ward.

Most recently, Grand'Maître was a bronze medalist in doubles with Frédérique Lambert at the 2012 World Championships in Santo Domingo, Dominican Republic, as they reached the semi-finals but lost to eventual champions Paola Longoria and Samantha Salas. She was also part of the Canadian women's team that got bronze in the team event in 2012.

Grand'Maître played both singles and doubles (with Vicki Shanks) at the 1994 Pan American Championships (then Tournament of the Americas) and got bronze and silver, respectively. In the 1998 Pan Am Championships, Grand'Maître was a silver medalist in doubles with Debbie Ward. She also played doubles at the Pan Am Championships the next year, in 1999, but with Lucie Guillemette as her partner, and they were bronze medalists.

Grand'Maître was a bronze medalist at the 2002 World Championships in singles, as she lost to American Cheryl Gudinas in the semi-finals. She played doubles with Saunders at the next World Championships in 2004, when they got bronze medals after losing in the semi-finals to Mexicans Susana Acosta and Rosy Torres.

In the 2003 Pan American Championships, Grand'Maître lost to Fenton in the semi-finals, resulting in a bronze medal.

Grand'Maître was a bronze medalist at the 2006 World Championships in doubles with Lori-Jane Powell, as they lost to Chileans Angela Grisar and Fabiola Marquez. That year the Canadian women's team took silver, and Grand'Maître and Powell won their match in the final against Americans Laura Fenton and Aimee Ruiz.

Grand'Maître may be the only player to participate in the first four Pan American Games that included racquetball. She was a bronze medalist at the 2003 Pan Am Games with Julie Neubauer, but also played singles in the 1996 Pan Am Games (losing in the quarter finals to Cheryl Gudinas), singles at the 1999 Pan Am Games, and doubles at the 2011 Pan Am Games with Brandi Jacobson Prentice.

Grand'Maître also played at the 2009 World Games.

== Professional career ==
Grand'Maître did not play many tournaments on the women's pro tour, so she was never ranked in the Top 10. But she did make the semi-finals of the 2009 Miami tournament, when she defeated Kerri Wachtel in the Round of 16 and then Diane Moore in the quarter finals before losing to Rhonda Rajsich in the semi-finals.

== Personal ==
Grand'Maître lives in Longueuil, Québec and works at the Canadian Olympic Committee. She has worked for 17 years at the Institut national du sport du Québec based in Montreal. She has an undergraduate degree in kinesiology and a certificate in administration from the University of Ottawa.

Grand'Maître is married to Michel Gagnon, one of Canada's national team coaches, and they have one son together, Mathieu Grand'Maître, and she is also a step mother to racquetball player Vincent Gagnon.

== See also ==
- List of racquetball players
