= Angela Grisar =

Chilean racquetball player

Personal information
- Born: May 2, 1973 (age 53) Santiago, Chile
- Height: 5 ft 5 in (165 cm)

Sport
- Sport: Racquetball

Achievements and titles
- World finals: 2nd (2004, 2006)
- Highest world ranking: 4th (2006-07, 2007-08)
Medal record
Women's racquetball
Representing Chile
World Championships
Silver medal – second place	2004 Anyang	Singles
Silver medal – second place	2006 Santo Domingo	Singles
Silver medal – second place	2006 Santo Domingo	Doubles
Silver medal – second place	2012 Santo Domingo	Doubles
Bronze medal – third place	2014 Burlington	Doubles
Pan Am Championships
Bronze medal – third place	2004 Pan Am Championships	Singles
Silver medal – second place	2006 Pan Am Championships	Doubles
Bronze medal – third place	2006 Pan Am Championships	Singles
Bronze medal – third place	2007 Pan Am Championships	Singles
Silver medal – second place	2008 Pan Am Championships	Doubles
Bronze medal – third place	2011 Pan Am Championships	Singles
Bronze medal – third place	2013 Pan Am Championships	Doubles
Pan American Games
Bronze medal – third place	2011 Guadalajara	Doubles
Bronze medal – third place	2003 Santo Domingo	Singles
Bronze medal – third place	1999 Winnipeg	Doubles
World Games
Bronze medal – third place	2009 Taipai	Singles
Bolivarian Games
Bronze medal – third place	2013 Trujillo	Singles
Bronze medal – third place	2013 Trujillo	Doubles

Angela Grisar (born May 2, 1973) is a Chilean retired racquetball player. She was the first South American woman's racquetball player to finish in the top 10 on the women's pro tour, doing so six straight seasons (2003-04 to 2008–09). She won numerous medals for Chile in international competitions, including at four International Racquetball Federation (IRF) World Championships and three Pan American Games.

== International career ==
Grisar was runner up in singles at the World Championships twice: in 2004, when she lost to Cheryl Gudinas in the final in Anyang, South Korea, and 2006, Canadian Christie Van Hees in the final in Santo Domingo, Dominican Republic.

Grisar has also been runner up in doubles twice at Worlds. She did it in 2006 with Fabiola Marquez, when they lost to Americans Laura Fenton and Aimee Ruiz, and in 2012 with Carla Muñoz, when they lost to Paola Longoria and Samantha Salas. Her latest medal at Worlds came in 2014, when she was a bronze medalist in Women's Doubles with Carla Muñoz.

Grisar was a double medalist at the 2006 Pan American Championships, when she got bronze in singles and silver in doubles with Fabiola Marquez.

In 2007, she was again a bronze medalist in singles at the Pan American Championships, and again a silver medalist in doubles with Marquez at the 2008 Pan American Championships.

Grisar has two doubles medals with Carla Muñoz. They got bronze at the 2011 Pan American Games, and at the 2013 Pan American Championships.

Grisar has three other bronze medals in singles: one from the 2004 Pan American Championships, when she lost to Canadian Lori-Jane Powell in the semi-finals, one from the 2011 Pan American Championships, when she lost to Samantha Salas in semi-finals, and the other at the 2009 World Games in Kaohsiung, Taiwan.

== Professional career ==
Grisar won one women's pro tournament, which came in 2007 in Miami, where she defeated Kerri Wachtel in the final, Rhonda Rajsich in the semi-finals and Kristen Walsh Bellows in the quarter finals. She was a semi-finalist at the US Open in 2007 and a US Open quarter finalist on five other occasions.

Over her career, Grisar was a top 10 player on the women's pro tour rankings for six consecutive seasons from 2003–04 to 2008–09. Her highest ranking was 4th at the end of the 2006–07 and 2007–08 seasons.

== Personal life ==
Grisar currently lives in San Ramon, California, where she is a health club manager in Fremont, California. She graduated from the Universidad Católica de Chile in 1997 (journalism & social communication) and the Universidad de Chile in 2006 (masters in anthropology & social development).

== See also ==
- List of racquetball players
