= Aimee Ruiz =

American racquetball player

Personal information
- Nationality: American
- Born: Aimee Roehler; February 12, 1975 (age 51) Allentown, Pennsylvania
- Height: 5 ft 4 in (163 cm)

Sport
- Sport: Racquetball

Achievements and titles
- World finals: 1st 2006, 2008, 2016 (doubles)
- National finals: 1st 2009 (singles), 1st 2005-2011, 2013-2014, 2016, 2017, 2019, 2020 (doubles)
Medal record
World Championships
Gold medal – first place	2006 World Championships	Doubles
Gold medal – first place	2008 World Championships	Doubles
Silver medal – second place	2010 World Championships	Doubles
Bronze medal – third place	2012 World Championships	Doubles
Silver medal – second place	2014 World Championships	Doubles
Gold medal – first place	2016 World Championships	Doubles
Pan Am Championships
Gold medal – first place	2006 Pan Am Championships	Doubles
Gold medal – first place	2008 Pan Am Championships	Doubles
Gold medal – first place	2009 Pan Am Championships	Doubles
Pan American Games
Silver medal – second place	2011 Guadalajara	Doubles
Silver medal – second place	2011 Guadalajara	Team

Aimee Ruiz (born February 12, 1975) is a left-handed American racquetball player. She is a three time Women's Doubles World Champion, and a 13 time USA Racquetball Champion in Women's Doubles, most recently winning the title in 2020 with Erika Manilla. In addition to her USA doubles titles, Ruiz has one USA National Women's Singles title. Ruiz was named to the USA Racquetball Hall of Fame in 2021.

== International career ==
Ruiz has competed for the USA ten times, reaching the podium each time. She has won three International Racquetball Federation (IRF) World Championships in Women's Doubles. Her first World Championship was in 2006 with Laura Fenton, when they defeated the Chilean team of Angela Grisar and Fabiola Marquez in Santo Domingo, Dominican Republic. Ruiz repeated as World Champion in 2008 with Jackie Paraiso, as they defeated Canadians Geneviève Brodeur and Véronique Guillemette in Kingscourt, Ireland.

But in 2010, Ruiz and Paraiso lost to Mexicans Paola Longoria and Samantha Salas in the final of the World Championships in Seoul, South Korea. Then in 2012, Ruiz was a late substitution for Kim Waselenchuk in doubles at Worlds, and she played with Rhonda Rajsich. They lost to Chileans Angela Grisar and Carla Muñoz, 15-14, 2-15, 11-10, in the semi-finals, which was the USA's first ever semi-final loss at Worlds in women's doubles. In 2014, Ruiz and Janel Tisinger were silver medalists in Women's Doubles at the World Championships losing to Longoria and Salas in the final, 15-4, 15-12.

However, in 2016, Ruiz and Tisinger won the Women's Doubles World Championships by upsetting the Mexican team of Longoria and Salas, who were three-time defending champions, 11-15, 15-9, 11-8, in the final. The win made Ruiz a World Champion for a third time.

Ruiz has won three Pan American Racquetball Championships in doubles, all with Paraiso as her partner. They first won in 2006, and then again in 2008 and 2009.

Ruiz played in the 2011 Pan American Games, playing doubles with Rhonda Rajsich and earned silver medals in the individual and team events.

== US Championships ==
Ruiz has 12 USA Racquetball National Doubles Championships. Her first two were with Laura Fenton - in 2005 and 2006, and then the following five were with Jackie Paraiso: 2007, 2008, 2009, 2010, and 2011. Their streak ended in 2012, when they lost in the semi-finals to Rhonda Rajsich and Kim Russell-Waselenchuk. But they did win the 3rd place match versus Marci Drexler and Laura Fenton.

Ruiz won five US National titles with Janel Tisinger as her partner. They won in 2013, 2014, 2016, 2017 and 2019. In 2016, they defeated Rajsich and Sheryl Lotts in the final, 15-12, 12-15, 11-10. In 2017, they defeated Da'monique Davis and Jackie Paraiso, 15-5, 15-5, in the final. In 2019, they defeated Michelle De La Rosa and Danielle Maddux in the final, 15-7, 15-7.

In 2020, she played with Erika Manilla for the first time at the USA National Doubles Championships, and they defeated Hollie Scott and Lexi York in the final, 15-6, 15-9.

Although Ruiz is a doubles specialist, she won the US National Singles championship in 2009. That win is especially impressive, because Ruiz won the title by defeating Kristen Walsh Bellows in the quarter finals, Rhonda Rajsich in the semi-final, and Cheryl Gudinas in the final, and those three players were all in the top 4 of the Ladies Professional Racquetball Tour that season.

== Professional career ==
Ruiz hasn't played professional racquetball very often, so she's never been ranked in the top 10 of the Ladies Professional Racquetball Tour.

== Personal life ==
Ruiz works in communications with ABR Communications. Born Aimee Roehler, she is married to Felix Ruiz, and they live in Whitehouse Station, New Jersey. She serves as the Social Media Director for the International Racquetball Tour.

In 2021, Ruiz announced she had been diagnosed with breast cancer, and wrote about the experience "with hopes of raising awareness for others."

== See also ==
- List of racquetball players
- Aimee Ruiz's company web page
- Aimee Ruiz's Twitter page
