= Susana Acosta =

Mexican racquetball player

Personal information
- Nickname: Suzy
- Born: 8 December 1976 (age 49) Chihuahua, Mexico

Sport
- Sport: Racquetball

Achievements and titles
- Highest world ranking: 4th
Medal record
Women's Racquetball
Representing Mexico
Pan Am Games
Gold medal – first place	Santo Domingo 2003	Doubles
World Championships
Silver medal – second place	Anyang 2004	Doubles
Pan Am Championships
Gold medal – first place	2004 Cuenca	Doubles
Gold medal – first place	2005 Caracas	Doubles
Gold medal – first place	2010 San Pedro Sula	Doubles
Gold medal – first place	2014 Santa Cruz	Doubles
Silver medal – second place	2014 Santa Cruz	Singles
Central American and Caribbean Games
Gold medal – first place	2010 Mayagüez	Doubles
Gold medal – first place	2010 Mayagüez	Team
Bronze medal – third place	2006 Cartagena	Singles
Gold medal – first place	2006 Cartagena	Team
Gold medal – first place	2002 San Salvador	Singles
Gold medal – first place	2006 San Salvador	Team
Silver medal – second place	2006 Maracaibo	Singles
Gold medal – first place	1998 Maracaibo	Team

Susana Acosta (born 8 December 1976) is a Mexican racquetball player. A left handed player, Acosta has won several gold medals for Mexico, including at the 2003 Pan American Games. She's also played on the Ladies Professional Racquetball Tour (LPRT) and been ranked as high as 4th (in 2012-13).

== Career begins - 1998-2006 ==
Acosta began playing the women's pro tour in 1998, when she played at the US Open Racquetball Championships for the first time, losing to Jackie Paraiso in the Round of 16. She was in half of the pro events in the 1998-99 season, and finished No. 13 in the rankings.

In her 2nd US Open Racquetball Championships, Acosta reached the semi-finals of the 1999 US Open by defeating Kersten Hallander in the quarterfinals, but then lost to Jackie Paraiso in the semis. That result helped her finish No. 5 in the pro rankings, her first top 10 on the pro tour.

Acosta won gold in Women’s Singles at the 2002 Central American and Caribbean Games in San Salvador, El Salvador, where she defeated Dominican Republic’s Claudine Garcia in the final, 7-15, 15-9, 11-2, and got to the final with a win over Puerto Rico’s Anita Maldonado, 15-12, 13-15, 11-4.

Acosta and Rosy Torres won the first women's racquetball gold medal at a Pan American Games when they won gold in Women's Doubles at the 2003 Pan American Games in Santo Domingo, Dominican Republic. Acosta and Torres defeated Americans Jackie Paraiso and Kim Russell, 8-15, 15-7, 11-9 in the final.

The next year, in 2004, Acosta and Torres became the first Mexicans to win Women's Doubles at the Pan American Racquetball Championships in Cuenca, Ecuador, where the defeated Canadians Josée Grand'Maître and Jennifer Saunders in the final, 15-14, 9-15, 11-6. and they successfully defended that title in 2005 by defeating Americans Kristen Walsh and Cheryl Gudinas in the final.

Acosta and Torres played Women's Doubles final at the 2004 World Championships in Anyang, South Korea, and defeated Canadians Josée Grand'Maître and Jennifer Saunders in the semi-finals, 8-15, 15-5, 11-4, but lost the final to Americans Jackie Paraiso and Kim Russell, 15-10, 10-15, 11-9.

Acosta played Women's Singles for Mexico at the 2006 Central American and Caribbean Games, and earned a bronze medal, and helped Mexico win gold in the Women's Team event.

== Career pause - 2006-2010 ==
Acosta only played a few pro tour events from 2006 to 2010. She kept her streak of US Open appearances intact, but didn't get past the Round of 16 during this period. Thus, Acosta slipped out of the top 10 pro players.

== Playing for Mexico again and full time on the pro tour - 2010-2019 ==
Acosta won Women's Doubles with Samantha Salas at the 2010 Pan American Championships in San Pedro Sula, Honduras, as they defeated Canadians Geneviève Brodeur and Frédérique Lambert in the final, 15-11, 15-4.

In the 2010 Central American and Caribbean Games, Acosta played Women's Doubles with Samantha Salas, and they won gold in by defeating Dominican Republic's Claudine Garcia and Yira Portes in the final.

Acosta's best season on the pro tour was in 2012-13, when she played all 11 events and reached the semi-finals 5 times - a career high. That resulted in her career best season end ranking: No. 4.

Momentum from that season carried over into the 2013-14 season, as in October 2013, Acosta reached the semi-finals of the US Open for just the 2nd time in her career and the first since 1999. She did it by defeating Jackie Paraiso, 11-8, 11-7, 4-11, 8-11, 11-2, in the Round of 16, and Janel Tisinger, 11-13, 8-11, 12-010, 11-4, 12-10, in the quarterfinals, before losing to Rhonda Rajsich, 4-11, 11-4, 11-9, 11-2. She hasn't been in a pro semi-final since then.

Acosta played singles and doubles at the 2014 Pan Am Championships, winning Women's Doubles with Samantha Salas, as they beat Canadians Josée Grand'Maître and Frédérique Lambert, 15-13, 15-12, in the semi-finals, and Argentina's Maria Jose Vargas and Véronique Guillemette in the final, 10-15, 15-8, 11-7. Acosta also played Women's Singles, defeating Colombian Cristina Amaya in the semi-finals, 15-10, 14-15, 11-7, but losing to Vargas in the final, 15-4, 15-8.

== 2020-present ==
Acosta has played some events on the pro tour in recent seasons, but only a few, and hasn't made it past the Round of 16.

== Career summary ==
Acosta has won several medals for Mexico over her career, highlighted by gold in Women's Doubles at the 2003 Pan American Games and gold in Women's Singles at the 2022 Central American and Caribbean Games. She's also been ranked in the Ladies Professional Racquetball Tour top 10 for 9 seasons, which is tied for 11th most.

=== Career records ===
This table lists Acosta's results across annual events.

Year	1998	1999	2000	2001	2002	2003	2004	2005	2006	2007	2008	2009	2010	2011	2012	2013	2014	2015	2016	2017	2018	2019	2020	2021	2022	2023
US Open	16	SF	16	16	16	16	16	16	16	16	16	16	16	16	QF	SF	16	16	QF	32	32					
LPRT Rank		13	5	6	11	10	15	14	11	19	23	21	17	6	6	4	8	11	9	9	18	22	23	26	27	25

Note: W = winner, F = finalist, SF = semi-finalist, QF = quarterfinalist, 16 = Round of 16, 32 = Round of 32, 64 = Round of 64, 128 = Round of 128.

== See also ==
- List of racquetball players
