= Jackie Paraiso =

American racquetball player

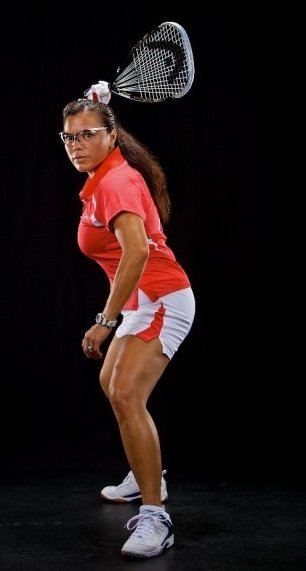
- Paraiso in 2009

Personal information
- Nickname: Jackie
- Born: Jacqueline Paraiso; September 14, 1966 (age 59) Fort Bragg, North Carolina, U.S.

Sport
- Sport: Racquetball
- Turned pro: 1986

Achievements and titles
- World finals: 7 Doubles titles (1990, 1994, 1996, 1998, 2002, 2004, 2008)
- National finals: 14 Doubles titles (1990, 1991, 1994, 1997, 1998, 2000, 2002-04, 2007-11)
- Highest world ranking: No. 1 (1991-92, 1998-99 to 1999-2000)
Medal record
Women's Racquetball
Representing United States
World Championships
Gold medal – first place	1990 Caracas	Doubles
Gold medal – first place	1994 San Luis Potosi	Doubles
Gold medal – first place	1996 Phoenix	Doubles
Gold medal – first place	1998 Cochabamba	Doubles
Gold medal – first place	2002 San Juan	Doubles
Gold medal – first place	2004 Anyang	Doubles
Gold medal – first place	2008 Kingscourt	Doubles
Silver medal – second place	2010 Seoul	Doubles
Pan Am Championships
Gold medal – first place	1991 Santiago	Singles
Gold medal – first place	1993 Cochabama	Singles
Gold medal – first place	1997 Chihuahua	Doubles
Gold medal – first place	1998 Winnipeg	Singles
Gold medal – first place	1999 Rosarito	Doubles
Gold medal – first place	2001 San Pedro Sula	Doubles
Gold medal – first place	2003 Santo Domingo	Doubles
Gold medal – first place	2006 Guatemala City	Doubles
Gold medal – first place	2008 San Jose	Doubles
Gold medal – first place	2009 Cali	Doubles
Pan American Games
Gold medal – first place	1995 Argentina	Doubles
Gold medal – first place	1999 Winnipeg	Doubles
Silver medal – second place	2003 Santo Domingo	Doubles

Jackie (Jacqueline) Paraiso (born September 14, 1966) is an American racquetball player. Paraiso was the #1 player on the women's pro racquetball tour at the end of the 1991–92, 1998–99, and 1999-2000 seasons. She is a seven time World Champion in women's doubles, which are more World Championships than any other player.

== Professional career ==
Paraiso finished in the top 10 at season's end on the women's pro tour 16 times between 1986–87 and 2003–04, including her three #1 finishes. Paraiso's best pro season was 1998-99, when she was in the finals of all seven events, winning six of them, including the 1998 US Open Racquetball Championships beating Christie Van Hees in three straight games, to finish at #1. That success carried over to the 1999-2000 season, when Paraiso won four of the five tournaments and a second US Open and again was #1 at season's end.

== International career ==
Paraiso has made more appearances on Team USA than any other racquetball player - man or woman - with 25 appearances over 20 years. The first was at the 1990 World Championships playing doubles with Malia Bailey, and last at the 2010 World Championships again in doubles (with Aimee Ruiz).

Paraiso's seven World Championships are more titles than any other racquetball player. Her first Worlds title came against Canadians Josée Grand'Maître and Vicky Brown in 1990, when Paraiso and Malia Bailey won 15-13, 15-8, and her last title was also against Canada, as she and Aimee Ruiz defeated Canadians Véronique Guillemette and Geneviève Brodeur, 15-8, 15-6, in 2008. In between, she won three straight World Championships in 1994, 1996, and 1998. Laura Fenton was Paraiso's partner in 1994, when they beat Vicky Shanks and Debbie Ward of Canada, 15-9, 15-7. Then in 1996 and 1998, Paraiso's twin sister Joy MacKenzie was her partner, as they beat Shanks and Ward in 1996, 15-11, 15-4, and Shanks and Grand'Maître in 1998, 15-7, 15-4.

Paraiso won another two titles with Kim Russell. First in 2002 against Canadians Amanda Macdonald and Karina Odegard, 15-10, 15-8, and then in 2004 against Mexicans Susana Acosta and Rosy Torres, 15-10, 10-15, 11-9.

Perhaps the highlights of Paraiso's international career are the gold medals she won playing doubles with her MacKenzie at the 1995 Pan Am Games in Argentina, when they beat Canadians Shanks and Ward, and the 1999 Pan Am Games in Winnipeg, where they defeated Ward and Lori-Jane Powell in the final. Paraiso and MacKenzie played together for Team USA seven times, and won gold each time.

In fact, Paraiso won gold in 23 of her 25 Team USA appearances. The only blemishes have been at the 2003 Pan Am Games, when she and Kim Russell lost 11-9 in the tie-breaker of the finals to the Mexican team of Susana Acosta and Rosy Torres, and at the 2010 World Championships, when she and Ruiz lost to Mexicans Paola Longoria and Samantha Salas also in a tie-breaker, 15-13, 13-15, 11-9.

== USA championships ==
Paraiso has won 14 U.S. doubles women's titles. Three of those titles were with sister Joy (in 1994, 1997 & 1998), five with Aimee Ruiz (2007–2011), three with Kim Russell (2002–2004), two with Michelle Gould (née Gilman) (1990 & 1991), and one with Laura Fenton (2000).

Paraiso's also won four mixed doubles titles with Jimmy Lowe (in 1997), Rocky Carson (1998), twice with Joe Paraiso, in 1996 and 1999, and with Tony Carson in 2011.

== Personal life ==
She is married to Michael Larsson, and has two daughters and three grandsons.

Paraiso was inducted into the Racquetball Hall of Fame in 2009.

Sporting positions
Preceded by Michelle Gilman; Michelle Gould	#1 Women's Pro Racquetball Player; 1991-92; 1998-99 to 1999-2000	Succeeded by Michelle Gould; Cheryl Gudinas
