= Lynn Adams (racquetball) =

American racquetball player

Personal information
- Nationality: American
- Born: 1958 (age 67–68)

Sport
- Sport: Racquetball
- Coached by: Jim Carson
- Retired: 1991

Achievements and titles
- Highest world ranking: 1st (1981-82, 1984-85, 1985-86, 1986-87, 1989-90)

Lynn Adams is a retired American racquetball player. A native of California, Adams was one of the dominant players in the 1980s, as she was ranked #1 or #2 every pro season between 1980 and 1991.

Adams was attending Orange Coast College, and a middle distance track athlete, when she first tried racquetball at age 19. Shortly after beginning to play, she met Jim Carson, who became her coach and stayed with her throughout her career.

== Professional career ==
In the first half of the 1980s, Adams had a fierce rivalry with Heather McKay that helped to establish the women's pro racquetball tour.

Adams was the dominant women's professional racquetball player after McKay moved back to her native Australia in 1985, and was undefeated in the 1985-86 season. She finished as the #1 player on the women's pro tour at the end of six seasons during the 1980s. She was Player of the Year eight times (1982–88, 1990) and won the women's pro Nationals six times (1982, 1983, 1985–88).

== Personal ==
Adams's relationship with Carson developed into a romantic one and they married in 1982, but that only lasted to 1986, yet they were able to continue working together as player and coach. Their relationship remained positive evidenced by Carson being in the wedding party for Adams's second marriage to Rich Clay in 1990.

Adams had serious health concerns beginning in December 1987, which was when she began having symptoms of multiple sclerosis that eventually led to her retirement in 1991.

After retiring, Adams was on the staff of America's Most Wanted Racquetball Camps, and co-authored an instructional racquetball book with Erwin Goldbloom.

== Honors ==
Adams was inducted into the USA Racquetball Hall of Fame in 1997. She was later inducted into the World Racquetball Hall of Fame in 2017 for her dominance in outdoor sports. She is also in the Orange Coast College Alumni Hall of Fame.

Sporting positions
Preceded by Heather McKay; Heather McKay; Caryn McKinney	No. 1 Women's Pro Racquetball Player; 1981–82; 1984–85 to 1987–88; 1989–90	Succeeded by Heather McKay; Caryn McKinney; Michelle Gilman
