= Michelle Gould (racquetball) =

American racquetball player

Personal information
- Nationality: American
- Born: Michelle Gilman; December 22, 1970 (age 55) Ontario, Oregon

Sport
- Sport: Racquetball
- Turned pro: 1989
- Retired: 1999

Achievements and titles
- Highest world ranking: No. 1 (1990–91, 1992–93 to 1997–98)
Medal record
Women's racquetball
Representing United States
World Championships
Gold medal – first place	1992 Montreal	Singles
Gold medal – first place	1994 San Luis Potosi	Singles
Gold medal – first place	1996 Phoenix	Singles
Pan Am Championships
Gold medal – first place	1988 Santa Cruz	Singles
Gold medal – first place	1990 Jacksonville	Singles
Gold medal – first place	1991 Santiago	Singles
Gold medal – first place	1994 Buenos Aires	Doubles
Gold medal – first place	1996 Cali	Doubles
Gold medal – first place	1998 Winnipeg	Singles
Pan American Games
Gold medal – first place	1995 Argentina	Singles
World Games
Gold medal – first place	1993 The Hague	Singles

Michelle Gould (née Gilman; born December 22, 1970) is a retired American racquetball player. She was the dominant player in the 1990s, finishing as the #1 player on the women's pro tour seven of those 10 seasons. Gould was once called "the best, man or woman, to ever play" racquetball. She had a strong drive serve. Injuries led to her retirement in 1999.

== Professional career ==
Gould first appeared in the women's pro tour season ending top 10 at #2 in 1989–90, and then finished #1 in seven of the next eight seasons. After her final season at #1, Gould disappeared from the top 10.

Gould's professional career was highlighted by winning the first two US Open Racquetball Championships in 1996 and 1997. During one stretch of her pro career (Oct 1995 – May 1997), Gould won 18 consecutive tournaments, and 30 of 33.

== International career ==
Gould won her first International Racquetball Federation (IRF) World Championship in 1992 by defeating Canadian Heather Stupp in the final, which avenged a loss to Stupp two years earlier. She then won the next two World Championships in 1994 and 1996, respectively defeating Robin Levine (USA) and Cheryl Gudinas (USA) in the finals.

She won the Pan American Championships (formerly the Tournament of the Americas) six times: four times in singles in 1988, 1990, 1991, and 1998 and twice in doubles in 1994 with Robin Levine and 1996 with Cheryl Gudinas.

Gould also won gold medals at the 1993 World Games and the 1995 Pan American Games.

== USA championships ==
Gould's eight US Nationals Championships in singles are tied for most won by a woman with Cheryl Gudinas. Gould won those eight titles in a nine-year span from 1989 to 1997, interrupted only by Robin Levine's victory in 1994.

Gould also won six US National Doubles titles. The first was with Cindy Doyle in 1989, then she won two with Jackie Paraiso in 1990 and 1991. Laura Fenton was Gould's partner for the 1993 title, and Gudinas won the 1995 and 1996 championships with Gould.

== Personal ==
Born Michelle Gilman, she married Rod Gould in 1992. Gould grew up in Ontario, Oregon, and she first took racquetball lessons in Boise, Idaho, where she later lived with her husband.

Sporting positions
Preceded by Lynn Adams; Jackie Paraiso Gibson	#1 Women's Pro Racquetball Player; 1990-91; 1992-93 to 1997-98	Succeeded by Jackie Paraiso Gibson; Jackie Paraiso
