= Cheryl Gudinas =

American racquetball player

Personal information
- Nationality: American
- Born: May 11, 1967 (age 59)
- Height: 5 ft 10 in (178 cm)
- Weight: 160 lb (73 kg)

Sport
- Sport: Racquetball
- Turned pro: 1993

Achievements and titles
- World finals: 1st 2000, 2002, 2004
- Regional finals: 1st
- National finals: 1st 1999–2003, 2005, 2008, 2010 (singles) 1st 1995, 1996, 2001 (doubles)
- Highest world ranking: 1
Medal record
Women's Racquetball
Representing United States
Pan American Games
Gold medal – first place	1999 Winnipeg	Singles
Gold medal – first place	2003 Santo Domingo	Singles
Bronze medal – third place	2011 Guadalajara	Singles
Silver medal – second place	2011 Guadalajara	Team
World Championships
Gold medal – first place	2000 Mexico	Singles
Gold medal – first place	2002 San Juan	Singles
Gold medal – first place	2004 Anyang	Singles
Gold medal – first place	2004 Anyang	Team
Gold medal – first place	2006 Santo Domingo	Team
Gold medal – first place	2008 Kingscourt	Team
Gold medal – first place	2010 Seoul	Team
Bronze medal – third place	2012 Santo Domingo	Singles
Silver medal – second place	2012 Santo Domingo	Team
Pan Am Championships
Gold medal – first place	1994 Buenos Aires	Singles
Gold medal – first place	1996 Cali	Doubles
Gold medal – first place	1997 Chihuahua	Singles
Silver medal – second place	1998 Winnipeg	Singles
Silver medal – second place	1999 Rosarito	Singles
Gold medal – first place	2001 San Pedro Sula	Singles
Silver medal – second place	2003 Santo Domingo	Singles
Silver medal – second place	2005 Caracas	Singles
Gold medal – first place	2009 Cali	Singles

Cheryl Gudinas (born May 11, 1967) is an American retired racquetball player. Gudinas won three [www.internationalracquetball.com International Racquetball Federation] (IRF) World Championships in Women’s Singles (2000, 2002, 2004), and was the #1 player on the women's pro racquetball tour from 2000-2004, finishing in the top 10 on tour a record 21 seasons.

== Professional career ==
Gudinas's professional career is highlighted by her two US Open Racquetball Championships in 2002 and 2004, which helped her attain the #1 position on the women's pro tour. She was a top 5 player on the women's pro tour from 1993-94 to 2010-2011, including four seasons as the #1 player from 2000-2004. Her 20 years ranked in the season ending top 10 is a record for women's pro racquetball. Gudinas fell to the #11 spot this past season partly due to missing the first few tournaments of the season with a foot injury.

== International career ==
Gudinas won three consecutive International Racquetball Federation (IRF) World Championships in 2000, 2002 and 2004. She defeated Canadians Christie Van Hees and Jennifer Saunders in 2000 and 2002, respectively, and Chilean Angela Grisar in 2004.

Gudinas won the Pan American Championships (formerly the Tournament of the Americas) in 1994 (against American Laura Fenton), 1997 (Michelle Gould, USA), 2001 (Josée Grand'Maître, Canada) and 2009 (Carola Loma, Bolivia). In 2005, Gudinas was the Pan Am Championship silver medalist, losing the final to Kristen Walsh and was also silver in 2003, when she lost to Fenton, in 1999, when she lost to Robin Levine, and 1998, losing to Michelle Gould.

Gudinas has also won two gold medals at the Pan American Games. In 1999 she defeated Canadian Christie Van Hees in the final in Winnipeg, Canada and beat fellow American Laura Fenton in the 2003 final in Santo Domingo, Dominican Republic. In the 2011 Pan Am Games in Guadalajara, Mexico, Gudinas earned the bronze medal, losing to eventual gold medalist Paola Longoria of Mexico in the semi-finals. Gudinas was also a silver medalist in 2011 from the Pan Am Games team competition.

Most recently in the 2012 Worlds, Gudinas was a bronze medalist in singles, losing to Canadian Jennifer Saunders in the semi-finals, and a silver medalist in the team competition, when the American women's team lost to the Mexican team, including a loss by Gudinas to Mexican Jessica Parrilla.

Gudinas has played in the World Games twice, and she finished 4th in both 2009 and 2011.

== US championships ==
Gudinas won 5 consecutive US Nationals Championships in singles from 1999 to 2003, and also won in 2005, 2008 and 2010. Her eight titles are tied for the most all time with Michelle Gould.

Gudinas teamed up with Gould in 1995 and 1996 to win two of her three US National Doubles titles. Her other title was in 2001 with Kim Russell.

== Career summary ==
Gudinas won 3 IRF World Championships in Women’s Singles, 2 US Open Racquetball Championships, and 8 US Racquetball Championships in Women’s Singles. Her 21 seasons in the Ladies Professional Racquetball Tour top 10 is a record.

=== Career record ===
This table lists Gudinas’s results in annual events.

Player	1995	1996	1997	1998	1999	2000	2001	2002	2003	2004	2005	2006	2007	2008	2009	2010	2011	2012	2013	2014	2015	2016	2017	2018	2019	2020
US Open		F	SF	QF	SF	SF	SF	W	SF	W	16	F	F	F	SF	QF	16	16		16	32	64			32	
Pro tour ranking	4	2	2	4	2	2	1	1	1	1	2	2	3	2	3	3	5	10	5	11	9	32	46	61	36	

Note: The US Open began in 1996. W = winner, F = finalist, SF = semi-finalist, QF = quarterfinalist, 16 = Round of 16, 32 = Round of 32, 64 = Round of 64.

== See also ==
- List of racquetball players

Sporting positions
Preceded by Jackie Paraiso Gibson	Number 1 Women's Pro Racquetball Player; 2000-2001 to 2003-2004	Succeeded by Christie Van Hees
