= Kerri Wachtel =

American racquetball player (born 1974)

Personal information
- Nationality: American
- Born: Kerri Stoffregen; November 9, 1974 (age 51) Cincinnati, Ohio
- Spouse: Chris Wachtel

Sport
- Sport: Racquetball
- Retired: 2013

Achievements and titles
- Highest world ranking: 2nd (2006-07)

Kerri Wachtel (born Kerri Stoffregen, November 9, 1974) is a retired American racquetball player. Wachtel was the #2 women's professional player at the end of the 2006–2007, and was #5 at the end of the 2008-09 Women's Professional Racquetball Organization season. She is a former US Open Champion.

== Career ==
=== Professional ===
Wachtel was a top 10 player on the women's pro tour every season between 2000–01 and 2013–14, except for 2005-06 when she took some time off to have children. But upon her return to competition she had arguably her best season as she reached a career high in the rankings, finishing #2 behind Rhonda Rajsich in 2006-07. In ten of the twelve seasons Wachtel was in the top 10, she was ranked #5 or higher.

Her career highlight was winning the 2001 US Open Racquetball Championships - the most prestigious pro racquetball title. She defeated Jackie Paraiso in the final, 15-13; 12-15; 15-11; 15-10.

=== Junior and collegiate ===
Wachtel won the US 18 & under Girls title in 1993 and the Junior Worlds title - the 1993 Girls 18 and under doubles title with Andrea Beugen. In 1994, she won the women's intercollegiate singles and doubles title (with partner Britt Engel) - which helped Memphis State University win the women's team title.

=== Pickleball ===
Kerri is currently a Pickleball Professional, teaching clinics and lessons and running programming for multiple locations. She is sponsored by Paddletek and is starting to play in some tournaments.

== Personal ==
Born Kerri Stoffregen, she is married to Chris Wachtel, who was a punter at the University of Notre Dame. They reside in Cincinnati, Ohio with their twin girls Peyton and Quinn and son Topher.

Wachtel and her husband have run the Wilson Tour for Hope event on the LPRT for several years, and they will continue to do so in Wachtel's retirement.

Wachtel is a graduate of Miami University in Oxford, Ohio.

== See also ==
- List of racquetball players
