= Laura Fenton =

American racquetball player

Personal information
- Nationality: American
- Born: June 28, 1962 (age 64) Lincoln, Nebraska
- Height: 5 ft 9 in (175 cm)

Sport
- Sport: Racquetball

Achievements and titles
- Highest world ranking: No. 4 (1996-07, 2001-02)
Medal record
Racquetball World Championships
Gold medal – first place	1994 Mexico	Doubles
Gold medal – first place	2006 Santo Domingo	Doubles
Bronze medal – third place	2002 San Juan	Singles
Pan American Games
Silver medal – second place	2003 Santo Domingo	Singles
Bronze medal – third place	1999 Winnipeg	Singles
Pan American Racquetball Championships
Gold medal – first place	2001 San Pedro Sula	Doubles
Gold medal – first place	2002 Cochabamba	Singles
Gold medal – first place	Santo Domingo	Singles

Laura Fenton (born June 28, 1962) is an American racquetball player. She won two World Championships in doubles, and finished in the top 10 on the Women's Professional Racquetball Organization rankings seven times in her career.

== Professional career ==
Fenton did not play professional racquetball until age 30, but she finished in the top 10 of the Women's Professional Racquetball Organization rankings seven times in her career, first in 1993-94 and last in 2005–06. She was ranked No. 4 twice in 1996-97 and 2000–01.

Fenton was a WPRO finalist three times but never won an event.

== International career ==
Fenton won the International Racquetball Federation (IRF) World Championships in women's doubles twice. In 1994, Fenton and Jackie Paraiso won the title in San Luis Potosí, Mexico, defeating Canadians Vicki Shanks and Debbie Ward in the final. Then twelve years later in 2006, Fenton and Aimee Ruiz won the title in Santo Domingo, Dominican Republic, beating Angela Grisar and Fabiola Marquez of Chile in the final.

Fenton and Paraiso also won doubles at the Pan Am Championships in 2001.

Fenton twice won the Pan Am Championships in 2002 and 2003. In 2002, she defeated Canadian Josée Grand'Maître in the final.

Fenton played in two Pan American Games. In 1999, she was bronze medalist in women's singles, and in 2003 she was silver medalist in women's singles, losing a tie-breaker to Cheryl Gudinas in the final.

Fenton was also a member of Team USA at the 2002 World Championships and got a bronze medal in singles, losing to Jennifer Saunders in the semi-finals.

== US Championships ==
Fenton won the US National Championships in doubles four times: in 2006 and 2005 with Aimee Ruiz, 2000 with Jackie Paraiso, and 1993 with Michelle Gould.

Fenton was second in singles at the 2003 US National Singles Championships, which qualified her for the 2003 Pan Am Games team.

== Personal life ==
Fenton was raised as a Seventh Day Adventist, so she was not allowed to compete in sports on the weekends, when tournaments are usually held.

Fenton has a B.A. from Union Adventist University and a master's degree from Western Michigan University in biomechanics, kinesiology and exercise physicology. Currently, she is an associate professor of Health and Exercise Science at La Sierra University in Riverside, California.

Fenton has one daughter, Jennifer.

== See also ==
- List of racquetball players
