= Ladies Professional Racquetball Tour =

The Ladies Professional Racquetball Tour is the latest name for the women's professional racquetball tour. It features the world's best players and several events each season - running from September to May - that are mostly played in the USA.

== History ==
Women's professional racquetball has existed since the 1970s but the women's pro tour began in 1980, when the Women's Professional Racquetball Association (WPRA) was created. The tour was run by International Management Group, and did well in the early 1980s in part due to the great rivalry between Lynn Adams and Heather McKay. The WPRA lasted until 1994, when the Women's International Racquetball Tour (WIRT) was created.

In 2000, the United States Racquetball Association (USRA) took over administration of the WIRT, and renamed it the Ladies Professional Racquetball Association (LPRA). This led to significant growth under the supervision of the USRA, which had a three year plan for the LPRA.

In 2005, the players took over control and ownership of the tour, and again it was reorganized and rebranded as the Women's Professional Racquetball Organization. Shannon Feaster, a former player and marketing executive, served as the WPRO Commissioner from February 2006 to May 2011, when she stepped down to focus on her family. Gigi Rock was then hired as the new commissioner in July 2011.

In 2012, the players decided to reorganize and created the LPRT with T. J. Baumbaugh as President and Andy Kulback Deputy Commissioner. Kulback resigned in October 2016.

== Current season ==
=== 2025-2026 (Tier 1 and Grand Slam Events) ===
Event	Champion	Runner Up	Semi Finalists	Quarterfinalists	Doubles Champions	Finalists
World Singles and Doubles Open Racquetball Championships Highlands Ranch, Colorado; September 4–7, 2025	(Argentina) Maria Jose Vargas; 15-8, 11-15, 11-0	(Mexico) Paola Longoria	(Argentina) Natalia Mendez (Mexico) Montserrat Mejía	(Italy) Cristina Amaya (Mexico) Samantha Salas (Bolivia) Brenda Laime (Chile) Carla Muñoz		
Golden State Open Pleasanton, California; October 8–12, 2025	(Argentina) Maria Jose Vargas; 15-8, 15-8	(Mexico) Paola Longoria	(Mexico) Montserrat Mejia (Guatemala) Gabriela Martinez	(United States) Sheryl Lotts (Argentina) Valeria Centellas (Bolivia) Brenda Laime (Argentina) Natalia Mendez		
Mile High Open Denver, Colorado; November 6-9, 2025	(Mexico) Montserrat Mejia; 15-11, 8-15, 11-8	(Argentina) Maria Jose Vargas	(Guatemala) Gabriela Martinez (Bolivia) Brenda Laime	(United States) Sheryl Lotts (Argentina) Valeria Centellas (Mexico) Alexandra Herrera (Argentina) Natalia Mendez	(Mexico) Alexandra Herrera (Mexico) Montserrat Mejia; 15-8, 15-14	(Argentina) Valeria Centellas (Argentina) Maria Jose Vargas
33rd Annual LPRT Christmas Classic Severna Park, Maryland; December 5–7, 2025	(Argentina) Maria Jose Vargas; 15-6, 15-12	(Mexico) Paola Longoria	(Argentina) Natalia Mendez (Mexico) Montserrat Mejia	(Argentina) Valeria Centellas (Bolivia) Brenda Laime (Guatemala) Gabriela Martinez (Mexico) Alexandra Herrera	(Mexico) Alexandra Herrera (Mexico) Montserrat Mejia; 15-9, 15-6	(Argentina) Valeria Centellas (Argentina) Maria Jose Vargas
Arizona Open Tempe, Arizona; January 15–17, 2026	(Argentina) Maria Jose Vargas; 15-4, 15-5	(Mexico) Paola Longoria	(Guatemala) Gabriela Martinez (Mexico) Montserrat Mejia	(United States) Annie Sanchez (Mexico) Alexandra Herrera (Chile) Carla Muñoz (Argentina) Valeria Centellas	(Mexico) Alexandra Herrera (Mexico) Montserrat Mejia; 15-8, 15-6	(Argentina) Valeria Centellas (Argentina) Maria Jose Vargas
Boston Open Marlborough, Massachusetts; March 5–8, 2026						

== Past Season Summaries (Tier I and Grand Slam Events) ==
=== Wins by season ===
Season	Wins	US Open winner
2025-26	(Argentina) Maria Jose Vargas (4), (Mexico) Montserrat Mejía	-
2024-25	(Mexico) Paola Longoria (2), (Mexico) Montserrat Mejía (2), (Argentina) Maria Jose Vargas (2), (Guatemala) Gabriela Martinez	-
2023-24	(Argentina) Maria Jose Vargas (5), (Mexico) Paola Longoria (3)	-
2022-23	(Mexico) Montserrat Mejía (5), (Mexico) Paola Longoria (3), (Mexico) Alexandra Herrera, (Guatemala) Gabriela Martinez	(Mexico) Paola Longoria
2021-22	(Mexico) Paola Longoria (6), (Mexico) Alexandra Herrera (2), (Guatemala) Gabriela Martinez	(Mexico) Paola Longoria
2020-21	(Mexico) Paola Longoria (2), (Mexico) Montserrat Mejía	No event due to COVID-19 pandemic
2019-20	(Mexico) Paola Longoria (7), (Argentina) Maria Jose Vargas	(Mexico) Paola Longoria
2018-19	(Mexico) Paola Longoria (9), (Argentina) Maria Jose Vargas	(Mexico) Paola Longoria
2017-18	(Mexico) Paola Longoria (7), (Mexico) Samantha Salas, (Argentina) Maria Jose Vargas	(Mexico) Paola Longoria
2016-17	(Mexico) Paola Longoria (10), (Canada) Frédérique Lambert, (Mexico) Samantha Salas	(Mexico) Paola Longoria
2015-16	(Mexico) Paola Longoria (11)	(Mexico) Paola Longoria
2014-15	(Mexico) Paola Longoria (10), (Argentina) Maria Jose Vargas (2), (United States) Rhonda Rajsich	(Mexico) Paola Longoria
2013-14	(Mexico) Paola Longoria (12)	(Mexico) Paola Longoria
2012-13	(Mexico) Paola Longoria (11)	(Mexico) Paola Longoria
2011-12	(Mexico) Paola Longoria (7), (United States) Rhonda Rajsich	(Mexico) Paola Longoria
2010-11	(Mexico) Paola Longoria (5), (United States) Rhonda Rajsich (4), (Mexico) Samantha Salas	(United States) Rhonda Rajsich
2009-10	(Mexico) Paola Longoria (5), (United States) Rhonda Rajsich (2), (United States) Cheryl Gudinas	(United States) Rhonda Rajsich
2008-09	(Mexico) Paola Longoria (4), (United States) Rhonda Rajsich (4), (United States) Kristen Walsh Bellows	(Mexico) Paola Longoria
2007-08	(United States) Rhonda Rajsich (5), (United States) Cheryl Gudinas (3), (Mexico) Paola Longoria, (Canada) Christie Van Hees	(United States) Rhonda Rajsich
2006-07	(United States) Rhonda Rajsich (5), (Canada) Christie Van Hees (3), (Chile) Angela Grisar, (United States) Kerri Wachtel	(Canada) Christie Van Hees
2005-06	(Canada) Christie Van Hees (3), (United States) Cheryl Gudinas (2), (United States) Rhonda Rajsich (2)	(Canada) Christie Van Hees
2004-05	(Canada) Christie Van Hees (4), (United States) Cheryl Gudinas (2), (United States) Rhonda Rajsich	(United States) Cheryl Gudinas
2003-04	(United States) Cheryl Gudinas (6), (Canada) Christie Van Hees (2), (United States) Rhonda Rajsich	(United States) Rhonda Rajsich
2002-03	(United States) Cheryl Gudinas (9), (United States) Jackie Paraiso (2), (United States) Kerri Wachtel	(United States) Cheryl Gudinas
2001-02	(United States) Cheryl Gudinas (9), (United States) Jackie Paraiso, (United States) Rhonda Rajsich, (United States) Kerri Wachtel	(United States) Kerri Wachtel
2000-01	(United States) Cheryl Gudinas (5), (United States) Jackie Paraiso (2), (Canada) Christie Van Hees (2), (United States) Rhonda Rajsich	(Canada) Christie Van Hees
1999-2000	(United States) Jackie Paraiso (4), (United States) Cheryl Gudinas	(United States) Jackie Paraiso
1998-99	(United States) Jackie Paraiso (7), (Canada) Christie Van Hees	(United States) Jackie Paraiso
1997-98	(United States) Michelle Gould (4), (United States) Marci Drexler	(United States) Michelle Gould
1996-97	(United States) Michelle Gould (10), (United States) Jackie Paraiso, (United States) Cheryl Gudinas	(United States) Michelle Gould
1995-96	(United States) Michelle Gould (9)	-
1994-95	(United States) Michelle Gould (3), (United States) Marci Drexler	-
1993-94	(United States) Michelle Gould (6), (United States) Marci Drexler	-
1992-93	(United States) Michelle Gould (4), (United States) Marci Drexler	-
1991-92	(United States) Michelle Gould (2), (United States) Jackie Paraiso (2), (United States) Malia Bailey (2), (United States) Toni Bevelock	-
1990-91	(United States) Michelle Gould (5), (United States) Lynn Adams (2)	-
1989-90	-	-
1988-89	(United States) Caryn McKinney (4), (United States) Lynn Adams (2)	-
1987-88	(United States) Lynn Adams (4), (United States) Caryn McKinney, (United States) Marci Drexler	-
1986-87	(United States) Lynn Adams (6), (United States) Caryn McKinney (2), (United States) Marci Drexler (2)	-
1985-86	(United States) Lynn Adams (7)	-
1984-85	(United States) Lynn Adams (8), (United States) Vicki Panzeri	-
1983-84	(Australia) Heather McKay (7), (United States) Lynn Adams (5)	-
1982-83	(United States) Lynn Adams (6), (Australia) Heather McKay (3), (United States) Shannon Wright	-
1981-82	(United States) Lynn Adams (6), (Australia) Heather McKay (4)	-
1980-81	(Australia) Heather McKay (3), (United States) Shannon Wright (2), (United States) Lynn Adams	-

Notes: The US Open began in 1996.

=== Most wins on tour ===
Rank	Player	Wins
1.	(Mexico) Paola Longoria	115
2.	(United States) Lynn Adams	47
3.	(United States) Michelle Gould	43
4.	(United States) Cheryl Gudinas	39
5.	(United States) Rhonda Rajsich	28
6.	(Australia) Heather McKay	20
7.	(United States) Jackie Paraiso	19
8.	(Argentina) Maria Jose Vargas	16
8.	(Canada) Christie Van Hees	16
10.	(Mexico) Montserrat Mejia	9

== Rankings ==
=== Season ending top 10 rankings ===
Rank	2020-21	2021-22	2022-23	2023-24	2024-25
1	(Mexico) Paola Longoria	(Mexico) Paola Longoria	(Mexico) Montserrat Mejía	(Argentina) Maria Jose Vargas	(Mexico) Paola Longoria
2	(Mexico) Alexandra Herrera	(Mexico) Alexandra Herrera	(Mexico) Paola Longoria	(Mexico) Paola Longoria	(Mexico) Montserrat Mejía (Argentina) Maria Jose Vargas
3	(Mexico) Montserrat Mejía	(Argentina) Maria Jose Vargas	(Mexico) Alexandra Herrera	(Mexico) Montserrat Mejía	
4	(Argentina) Maria Jose Vargas	(Argentina) Natalia Mendez	(United States) Erika Manilla	(Mexico) Alexandra Herrera	(Guatemala) Gabriela Martinez
5	(Mexico) Samantha Salas	(Guatemala) Gabriela Martinez	(Bolivia) Brenda Laime	(Bolivia) Brenda Laime	(Argentina) Natalia Mendez
6	(Argentina) Natalia Mendez	(United States) Erika Manilla	(Bolivia) Angélica Barrios	(United States) Kelani Lawrence	(Bolivia) Brenda Laime
7	(Mexico) Jessica Parrilla	(Bolivia) Angélica Barrios	(Argentina) Maria Jose Vargas	(Argentina) Natalia Mendez	(United States) Kelani Lawrence
8	(Bolivia) Angélica Barrios	(Mexico) Jessica Parrilla	(Mexico) Jessica Parrilla	(Colombia) Cristina Amaya	(Mexico) Alexandra Herrera
9	(Argentina) Valeria Centellas	(United States) Rhonda Rajsich	(Chile) Carla Muñoz	(Chile) Carla Muñoz	(Mexico) Jessica Parrilla
10	(United States) Rhonda Rajsich	(Mexico) Montserrat Mejía	(Argentina) Natalia Mendez	(Guatemala) Gabriela Martinez (United States) Erika Manilla	(Colombia) Cristina Amaya

Rank	2015-16	2016-17	2017-18	2018-19	2019-20
1	(Mexico) Paola Longoria	(Mexico) Paola Longoria	(Mexico) Paola Longoria	(Mexico) Paola Longoria	(Mexico) Paola Longoria
2	(United States) Rhonda Rajsich	(Canada) Frédérique Lambert	(Canada) Frédérique Lambert	(Mexico) Samantha Salas	(Argentina) Maria Jose Vargas
3	(Argentina) Maria Jose Vargas	(Mexico) Samantha Salas	(Mexico) Jessica Parrilla	(Argentina) Maria Jose Vargas	(Mexico) Samantha Salas
4	(Canada) Frédérique Lambert	(Mexico) Jessica Parrilla	(Mexico) Alexandra Herrera	(Mexico) Alexandra Herrera	(Mexico) Alexandra Herrera
5	(Mexico) Samantha Salas	(Mexico) Alexandra Herrera	(United States) Rhonda Rajsich	(United States) Rhonda Rajsich	(Argentina) Natalia Mendez
6	(Mexico) Jessica Parrilla	(United States) Rhonda Rajsich	(Mexico) Nancy Enriquez	(Argentina) Natalia Mendez	(Mexico) Montserrat Mejía
7	(Mexico) Sofia Rascon	(Colombia) Cristina Amaya	(Argentina) Natalia Mendez	(Mexico) Nancy Enriquez	(United States) Rhonda Rajsich
8	(Mexico) Alexandra Herrera	(Chile) Carla Muñoz	(Colombia) Cristina Amaya	(Colombia) Cristina Amaya	(Mexico) Nancy Enriquez
9	(Mexico) Susana Acosta	(Mexico) Susana Acosta	(Argentina) Maria Jose Vargas	(Canada) Frédérique Lambert	(Colombia) Cristina Amaya
10	(Colombia) Cristina Amaya	(Colombia) Adriana Riveros	(Chile) Carla Muñoz	(Colombia) Adriana Riveros	(Mexico) Jessica Parrilla

Rank	2010-11	2011-12	2012-13	2013-14	2014-15
1	(United States) Rhonda Rajsich	(Mexico) Paola Longoria	(Mexico) Paola Longoria	(Mexico) Paola Longoria	(Mexico) Paola Longoria
2	(Mexico) Paola Longoria	(United States) Rhonda Rajsich	(United States) Rhonda Rajsich	(United States) Rhonda Rajsich	(Argentina) Maria Jose Vargas
3	(Mexico) Samantha Salas	(United States) Kerri Wachtel	(Mexico) Samantha Salas	(Argentina) Maria Jose Vargas	(United States) Rhonda Rajsich
4	(United States) Kerri Wachtel	(United States) Krystal Csuk	(Mexico) Susana Acosta	(Mexico) Samantha Salas	(Canada) Frédérique Lambert
5	(United States) Cheryl Gudinas	(United States) Adrienne Fisher	(United States) Cheryl Gudinas	(Colombia) Cristina Amaya	(Mexico) Samantha Salas
6	(Mexico) Susana Acosta	(Mexico) Susana Acosta	(United States) Adrienne Fisher	(Canada) Frédérique Lambert	(Colombia) Cristina Amaya
7	(Canada) Jennifer Saunders	(Canada) Jennifer Saunders	(United States) Grace Hughes	(United States) Aubrey Kirch	(United States) Michelle Key
8	(United States) Adrienne Fisher	(Colombia) Cristina Amaya	(United States) Kerri Wachtel	(Mexico) Susana Acosta	(Mexico) Sofia Rascon
9	(Colombia) Cristina Amaya	(United States) Kristen Walsh Bellows	(Colombia) Cristina Amaya	(Ecuador) Veronica Sotomayor	(United States) Cheryl Gudinas
10	(United States) Krystal Csuk	(United States) Cheryl Gudinas	(Bolivia) Maria Jose Vargas	(United States) Da'monique Davis	(United States) Da'monique Davis

Rank	2005-06	2006-07	2007-08	2008-09	2009-10
1	(United States) Rhonda Rajsich	(United States) Rhonda Rajsich	(United States) Rhonda Rajsich	(Mexico) Paola Longoria	(Mexico) Paola Longoria
2	(United States) Cheryl Gudinas Holmes	(United States) Kerri Wachtel	(United States) Cheryl Gudinas Holmes	(United States) Rhonda Rajsich	(United States) Rhonda Rajsich
3	(Canada) Christie Van Hees	(United States) Cheryl Gudinas Holmes	(United States) Kerri Wachtel	(United States) Cheryl Gudinas Holmes	(United States) Cheryl Gudinas Holmes
4	(United States) Kristen Walsh Bellows	(Chile) Angela Grisar	(Chile) Angela Grisar	(United States) Kristen Walsh Bellows	(United States) Kerri Wachtel
5	(Chile) Angela Grisar	(Canada) Christie Van Hees	(United States) Kristen Walsh Bellows	(United States) Kerri Wachtel	(United States) Adrienne Fisher
6	(United States) Diane Moore	(United States) Brenda Kyzer	(Mexico) Paola Longoria	(Ecuador) Veronica Sotomayor	(United States) Jo Shattuck
7	(United States) Brenda Kyzer	(United States) Kristen Walsh Bellows	(United States) Adrienne Fisher	(United States) Adrienne Fisher	(United States) Keely Franks
8	(United States) Jo Shattuck	(Mexico) Samantha Salas	(United States) Brenda Kyzer	(Chile) Angela Grisar	(United States) T. J. Baumbaugh
9	(United States) Tammy Brown	(United States) Jo Shattuck	(Canada) Christie Van Hees	(Canada) Jennifer Saunders	(United States) Vivian Gomez
10	(United States) Laura Fenton	(United States) Diane Moore	(United States) Doreen Fowler	(United States) Jo Shattuck	(Mexico) Samantha Salas

Rank	2000-01	2001-02	2002-03	2003-04	2004-05
1	(United States) Cheryl Gudinas	(United States) Cheryl Gudinas	(United States) Cheryl Gudinas	(United States) Cheryl Gudinas	(Canada) Christie Van Hees
2	(United States) Jackie Paraiso	(United States) Jackie Rice	(United States) Jackie Paraiso Rice	(Canada) Christie Van Hees	(United States) Cheryl Gudinas
3	(United States) Rhonda Rajsich	(United States) Kerri Wachtel	(United States) Kerri Wachtel	(United States) Rhonda Rajsich	(United States) Rhonda Rajsich
4	(United States) Laura Fenton	(United States) Rhonda Rajsich	(United States) Rhonda Rajsich	(United States) Kerri Wachtel	(United States) Kerri Wachtel
5	(United States) Kersten Hallander	(United States) Kersten Hallander	(United States) Kersten Hallander	(United States) Kristen Walsh Bellows	(United States) Kristen Walsh Bellows
6	(Mexico) Susana Acosta	(United States) Kristen Walsh Bellows	(United States) Adrienne Fisher	(United States) Kersten Hallander	(Chile) Angela Grisar
7	(United States) Doreen Fowler	(Dominican Republic) Claudine Garcia	(United States) Kim Russell	(United States) Adrienne Fisher	(United States) Tammy Brown
8	(United States) Kerri Stoffregen	(United States) Kim Russell	(United States) Kristen Walsh Bellows	(United States) Tammy Brown	(United States) Adrienne Fisher
9	(Canada) Lori-Jane Powell	(Canada) Lori-Jane Powell	(Canada) Lori-Jane Powell	(Chile) Angela Grisar	(United States) Diane Moore
10	(United States) Kim Machiran	(United States) Laura Fenton	(Mexico) Susana Acosta	(United States) Jackie Paraiso Rice	(United States) Brenda Kyzer

- Note - Christie Van Hees announced she was retiring at the end of the 2000-01 season, and was omitted from the season ending rankings despite winning two tournaments that season and being in the finals of two others. She certainly would have been in the top 10 that season.

Rank	1995-96	1996-97	1997-98	1998-99	1999-2000
1	(United States) Michelle Gould	(United States) Michelle Gould	(United States) Michelle Gould	(United States) Jackie Paraiso	(United States) Jackie Paraiso
2	(United States) Cheryl Gudinas	(United States) Cheryl Gudinas	(United States) Jackie Paraiso	(United States) Cheryl Gudinas	(United States) Cheryl Gudinas
3	(United States) Amy Kilbane	(United States) Jackie Paraiso	(United States) Marci Drexler	(Canada) Christie Van Hees	(Canada) Christie Van Hees
4	(United States) Marcy Lynch*	(United States) Laura Fenton	(United States) Cheryl Gudinas	(United States) Kersten Hallander	(United States) Kersten Hallander
5	(United States) Anita Maldonado*	(United States) Molly O'Brien	(United States) Laura Fenton	(United States) Lydia Hammock	(Mexico) Susana Acosta
6	(United States) Kim Machiran	(United States) Lynne Coburn	(United States) Lynne Coburn	(United States) Robin Levine	(United States) Lisa Hjelm
7	(United States) Molly O'Brien	(United States) Marcy Lynch	(United States) Molly O'Brien	(United States) Molly O'Brien	(United States) Kim Machiran
8	(United States) Jackie Paraiso	(United States) Janet Myers	(United States) Lorraine Galloway	(United States) Michelle Wiragh	(United States) Phyllis Morris
9	(United States) Dina Moreland	(United States) Lydia Hammock	(United States) Lydia Hammock	(United States) Janet Myers	(United States) Doreen Fowler
10	(United States) Lynne Coburn	(United States) Randi Friedman	(United States) Doreen Fowler	(Canada) Lori-Jane Powell	(United States) Michelle Lucas

- Note - Marcy Lynch and Anita Maldonado tied for 4th in 1995-96.

Rank	1990-91	1991-92	1992-93	1993-94	1994-95
1	(United States) Michelle Gilman	(United States) Jackie Paraiso Gibson	(United States) Michelle Gould	(United States) Michelle Gould	(United States) Michelle Gould
2	(United States) Lynn Adams	(United States) Malia Kamahoahoa Bailey	(United States) Marci Drexler	(United States) Marci Drexler	(United States) Robin Levine
3	(United States) Malia Bailey	(United States) Toni Bevelock	(United States) Malia Bailey	(United States) Robin Levine	(United States) Marci Drexler
4	(United States) Caryn McKinney	(United States) Michelle Gilman Gould	(United States) Jackie Paraiso Gibson	(United States) Cheryl Gudinas	(United States) Cheryl Gudinas
5	(United States) Jackie Paraiso	(United States) Dottie Fishl Kelly	(United States) Lynne Coburn	(United States) Lynne Coburn	(United States) Lynne Coburn
6	(United States) Toni Bevelock	(United States) Marci Drexler	(United States) Kaye Kuhfeld	(United States) Molly O’Brien	(United States) Chris Evon
7	(United States) Kaye Kuhfeld	(United States) Marcy Lynch	(United States) Toni Bevelock*	(United States) Laura Fenton	(United States) Laura Fenton
8	(United States) Marci Drexler	(United States) Lynne Coburn	(United States) Molly O'Brien*	(United States) Chris Evon	(United States) Molly O'Brien
9	(United States) Lynne Coburn	(United States) Kaye Kuhfeld	(United States) Chris Evon	(United States) Ellen Crawford	(United States) Marcy Lynch
10	(United States) Marcy Lynch	(United States) Robin Levine	(United States) Caryn McKinney	(United States) Roz Olson	(United States) Amy Kilbane

- Note - Toni Bevelock and Molly O'Brien tied for 7th in 1992-93.

Rank	1985-96	1986-87	1987-88	1988-89	1989-90
1	(United States) Lynn Adams	(United States) Lynn Adams	(United States) Lynn Adams	(United States) Caryn McKinney	(United States) Lynn Adams
2	(United States) Caryn McKinney	(United States) Caryn McKinney	(United States) Caryn McKinney	(United States) Lynn Adams	(United States) Michelle Gilman
3	(United States) Marci Drexler	(United States) Marci Drexler	(United States) Kaye Kuhfeld	(United States) Toni Bevelock	(United States) Caryn McKinney
4	(United States) Vicki Panzeri	(United States) Molly O'Brien	(United States) Marci Drexler	(United States) Marci Drexler	(United States) Toni Bevelock
5	(United States) Terri Gilreath*	(United States) Vicki Panzeri	(United States) Molly O'Brien	(United States) Kaye Kuhfeld	(United States) Kaye Kuhfeld
6	(United States) Bonnie Stoll*	(United States) Kaye Kuhfeld	(United States) Jackie Paraiso	(United States) Molly O'Brien	(United States) Malia Bailey
7	(United States) Molly O'Brien*	(United States) Terri Gilreath	(United States) Vicki Panzeri	(United States) Dottie Fishl	(United States) Molly O'Brien
8	(United States) Sandy Robson*	(United States) Marcy Lynch	(United States) Liz Alvarado	(United States) Jackie Paraiso	(United States) Jackie Paraiso
9	(United States) Fran Davis	(United States) Chris Evon	(United States) Toni Bevelock	(United States) Cindy Doyle	(United States) Dottie Fishl
10	(United States) Trina Rasmussen	(United States) Jackie Paraiso	(United States) Cindy Doyle	(United States) Marcy Lynch	(United States) Chris Evon

Note: In the 1986-85 season, Terri Gilreath and Bonnie Stoll tied for 5th and Molly O'Brien and Sandy Robson tied for 7th.

Rank	1980-81	1981-82	1982-83	1983-84	1984-85
1	(Australia) Heather McKay	(United States) Lynn Adams	(Australia) Heather McKay	(Australia) Heather McKay	(United States) Lynn Adams
2	(United States) Lynn Adams	(Australia) Heather McKay	(United States) Lynn Adams	(United States) Lynn Adams	(United States) Vicki Panzeri
3	(United States) Shannon Wright	(United States) Shannon Wright	(United States) Shannon Wright	(United States) Shannon Wright-Hamilton	(United States) Terri Gilreath
4	(United States) Marci Greer	(United States) Marci Greer	(United States) Laura Martino	(United States) Janell Marriott	(United States) Caryn McKinney
5	(United States) Karin Walton-Trent	(United States) Peggy Gardner	(United States) Vicki Panzeri	(United States) Vicki Panzeri	(United States) Marci Drexler
6	(United States) Peggy Gardner	(United States) Laura Martino	(United States) Janell Marriott	(United States) Terri Gilreath	(United States) Janell Marriott
7	(United States) Laura Martino	(United States) Terri Gilreath	(United States) Marci Greer	(United States) Laura Martino	(Australia) Heather McKay
8	(United States) Linda Prefontaine	(United States) Rita Hoff	(United States) Terri Gilreath	(United States) Caryn McKinney	(United States) Liz Alvarado
9	(United States) Francine Davis	(United States) Jennifer Harding	(United States) Peggy Gardner	(United States) Marci Greer	(United States) Diane Bullard
10	(United States) Janell Marriott	(United States) Vicki Panzeri	(Canada) Heather Stupp	(United States) Brenda Barrett	(United States) Cindy Baxter

=== Most seasons in top 10 ===
Rank	Player	Years
1.	(United States) Rhonda Rajsich	22
2.	(United States) Cheryl Gudinas	21
3.	(Mexico) Paola Longoria	18
4.	(United States) Jackie Paraiso	16
5.	(Colombia) Cristina Amaya	12
5.	(United States) Molly O'Brien	12
5.	(Argentina) Maria Jose Vargas	12
5.	(United States) Kerri Wachtel	12
9.	(Mexico) Samantha Salas	11
9.	(United States) Lynn Adams	11
9.	(United States) Marci Drexler	11
12.	(Mexico) Alexandra Herrera	10

=== Players ranked #1 at season's end ===
- Seasons ended No. 1
1.	(Mexico) Paola Longoria	14
2.	(United States) Michelle Gould	7
3.	(United States) Lynn Adams	6
4.	(United States) Cheryl Gudinas	4
4.	(United States) Rhonda Rajsich	4
6.	(Australia) Heather McKay	3
6.	(United States) Jackie Paraiso	3
8.	(Mexico) Montserrat Mejía	1
8.	(Argentina) Maria Jose Vargas	1
8.	(United States) Caryn McKinney	1
8.	(Canada) Christie Van Hees	1

- 1980-81: (Australia) Heather McKay
- 1981-82: (United States) Lynn Adams
- 1982-83: (Australia) Heather McKay (2)
- 1983-84: (Australia) Heather McKay (3)
- 1984-85: (United States) Lynn Adams (2)
- 1985-86: (United States) Lynn Adams (3)
- 1986-87: (United States) Lynn Adams (4)
- 1987-88: (United States) Lynn Adams (5)
- 1988-89: (United States) Caryn McKinney
- 1989-90: (United States) Lynn Adams (6)
- 1990-91: (United States) Michelle Gilman
- 1991-92: (United States) Jackie Paraiso Gibson
- 1992-93: (United States) Michelle Gould (2)
- 1993-94: (United States) Michelle Gould (3)
- 1994-95: (United States) Michelle Gould (4)
- 1995-96: (United States) Michelle Gould (5)
- 1996-97: (United States) Michelle Gould (6)
- 1997-98: (United States) Michelle Gould (7)
- 1998-99: (United States) Jackie Paraiso (2)
- 1999-2000: (United States) Jackie Paraiso (3)
- 2000-01: (United States) Cheryl Gudinas
- 2001-02: (United States) Cheryl Gudinas (2)
- 2002-03: (United States) Cheryl Gudinas (3)
- 2003-04: (United States) Cheryl Gudinas (4)
- 2004-05: (Canada) Christie Van Hees
- 2005-06: (United States) Rhonda Rajsich
- 2006-07: (United States) Rhonda Rajsich (2)
- 2007-08: (United States) Rhonda Rajsich (3)
- 2008-09: (Mexico) Paola Longoria
- 2009-10: (Mexico) Paola Longoria (2)
- 2010-11: (United States) Rhonda Rajsich (4)
- 2011-12: (Mexico) Paola Longoria (3)
- 2012-13: (Mexico) Paola Longoria (4)
- 2013-14: (Mexico) Paola Longoria (5)
- 2014-15: (Mexico) Paola Longoria (6)
- 2015-16: (Mexico) Paola Longoria (7)
- 2016-17: (Mexico) Paola Longoria (8)
- 2017-18: (Mexico) Paola Longoria (9)
- 2018-19: (Mexico) Paola Longoria (10)
- 2019-20: (Mexico) Paola Longoria (11)
- 2020-21: (Mexico) Paola Longoria (12)
- 2021-22: (Mexico) Paola Longoria (13)
- 2022-23: (Mexico) Montserrat Mejía
- 2023-24: (Argentina) Maria Jose Vargas
- 2024-25: (Mexico) Paola Longoria (14)
