= Christie Van Hees =

Canadian retired racquetball player (born 1977)

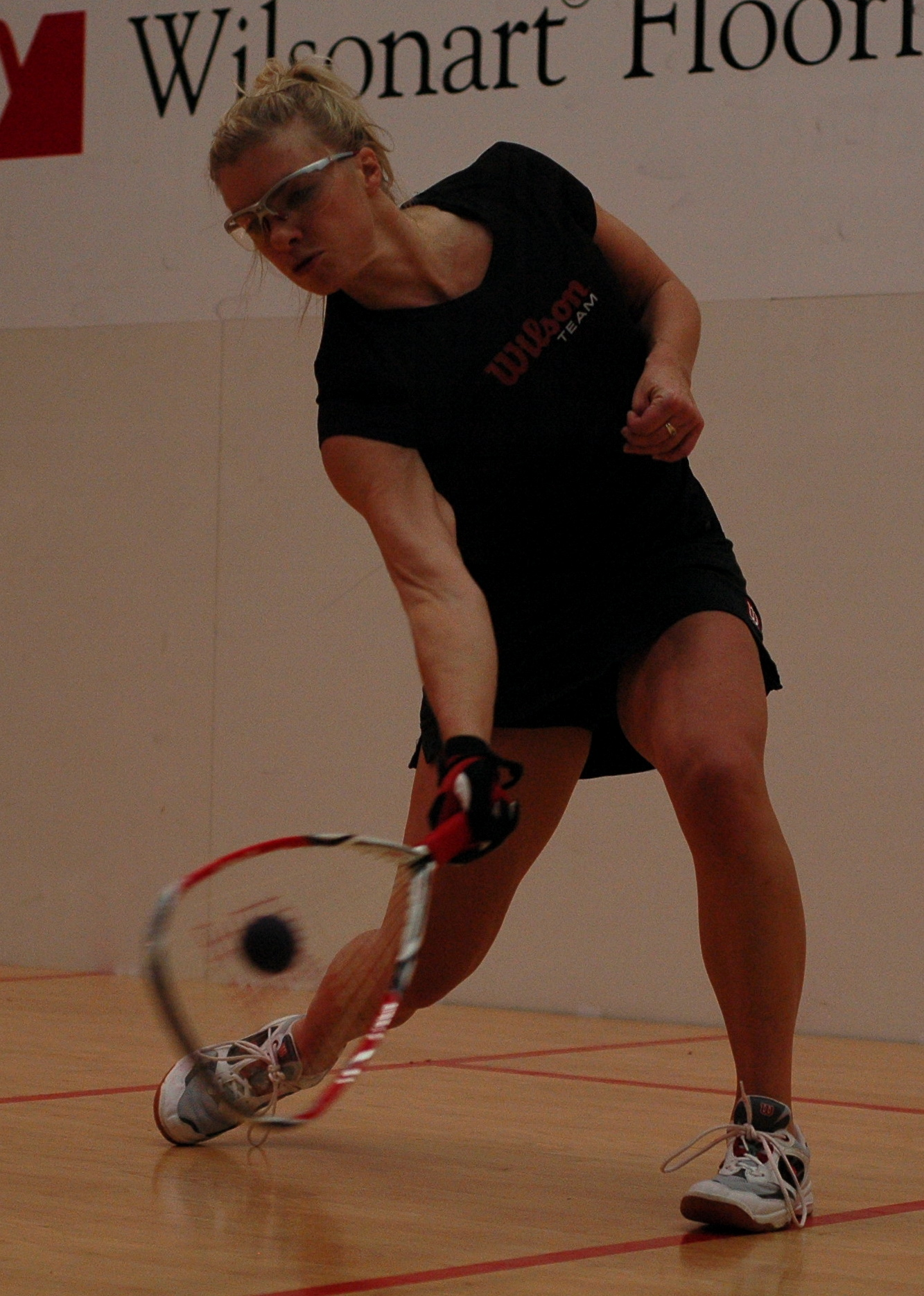
- Van Hees at 2007 US Open, Memphis Tennessee

Personal information
- Nationality: Canadian
- Born: July 5, 1977 (age 48) Kelowna, British Columbia, Canada

Sport
- Sport: Racquetball

Achievements and titles
- National finals: 1st 1997, 1998, 2000, 2006-2008 (singles)
- Highest world ranking: 1st 2005
Medal record
Women's Racquetball
Representing Canada
World Championships
Gold medal – first place	1998 World Championships	Singles
Gold medal – first place	2006 World Championships	Singles
Pan American Games
Silver medal – second place	1999 Winnipeg	Singles

Christie Van Hees (born July 5, 1977) is a Canadian retired racquetball player. Van Hees won two World Championships in women's singles and was the number one women's professional player at the end of the 2004-2005 season.

== Professional career ==
Van Hees's three US Open Racquetball Championships - the most prestigious pro racquetball title - are the third most by a woman behind Paola Longoria with six and Rhonda Rajsich with four. Van Hees won in 2000 and 2005, defeating Rajsich in the finals both years, and then again in 2006, when she defeated Cheryl Gudinas in the final. Her 2005 victory helped Van Hees finish that season as the #1 player in the women's professional rankings.

== Canadian and international career ==
Van Hees has won six Canadian Championships in 1997, 1998, 2000, and three consecutive years from 2006 to 2008.

Van Hees has won two International Racquetball Federation (IRF) World Championships in 1998 and 2006. She beat Kersten Hallander (USA) in the 1998 final, and Angela Grisar (Chile) in the 2006 final.

Van Hees also won the Girls 18 and under division at the IRF World Junior Championships in 1995.

== Personal life ==
Van Hees had considerable success early in her career, but then retired in 2001. But that turned out to be only a sabbatical, as she came back the fall of 2003, and had even greater success, reaching the final of the US Open in only her second tournament back.

In August 2009, Van Hees married Jack Huczek, an American, who is also a champion racquetball player having won three IRF World Championships. Originally from Kelowna, British Columbia, Van Hees currently resides in Dallas, Texas with Huczek and their two daughters, Evelyn and Faith.

Van Hees was inducted into the Central Okanagan Sports Hall of Fame on November 19, 2015.

Sporting positions
Preceded by Cheryl Gudinas	Number 1 Women's Pro Racquetball Player; 2004-2005	Succeeded by Rhonda Rajsich
