= Racquetball =

Racquet sport played with a hollow rubber ball in an indoor or outdoor court

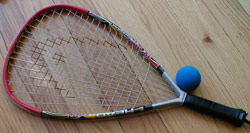
- Racquetball racquet and ball
- Highest governing body: International Racquetball Federation (IRF)

Characteristics
- Contact: No
- Team members: Singles or doubles
- Mixed-sex: Yes, separate tours & mixed doubles
- Type: Racquet sport
- Equipment: Racquetball ball, racquetball racquet
- Venue: Indoor or outdoor racquetball court

Presence
- Country or region: Americas
- Olympic: No
- Paralympic: No
- World Games: 1981, 1985, 1993, 2009, 2013, 2022, 2025

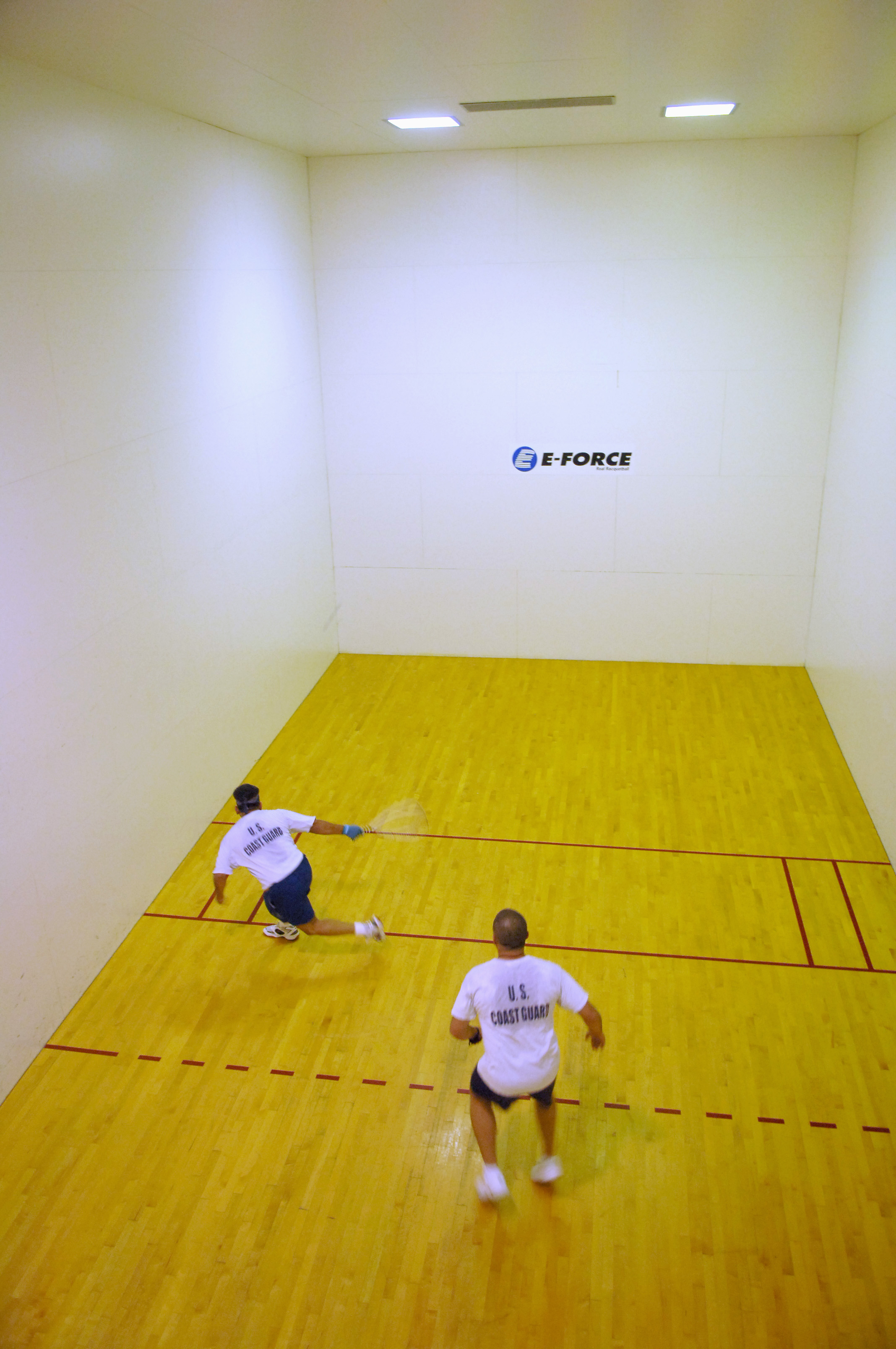
People playing racquetball

Racquetball is a racquet sport and a team sport played with a hollow rubber ball on an indoor or outdoor court. Joseph Sobek invented the modern sport of racquetball in 1950, adding a stringed racquet to paddleball in order to increase velocity and control. Unlike most racquet sports, such as tennis and badminton, there is no net to hit the ball over, and, unlike squash, no tin (out of bounds area at the bottom of front wall) to hit the ball above. Also, the court's walls, floor, and ceiling are legal playing surfaces, with the exception of court-specific designated hinders being out-of-bounds. Racquetball is played between two players (in singles) or four players, two to a team (in doubles) who try to hit the ball with the racquet so that it hits the front wall before hitting the ground, such that an opposing team's player cannot bounce it back to the front wall.

The sport is similar to 40×20 American handball, which is played in many countries. It is also similar to the British sport Squash 57, which was called racketball before 2016.

== History ==
Joseph Sobek is credited with inventing the sport of racquetball in the Greenwich, Connecticut, YMCA, though not with naming it. A professional tennis and American handball player, Sobek sought a fast-paced sport that was easy to learn and play. He designed the first strung paddle, devised a set of rules, based on those of squash, handball, and paddleball, and named his game paddle rackets.

In February 1952, Sobek founded the National Paddle Rackets Association (NPRA), codified the rules, and had the rules printed as a booklet. The new sport was rapidly adopted and became popular through Sobek's continual promotion of it. He was aided by the existence of some 40,000 handball courts in the country's YMCAs and Jewish Community Centers, wherein racquetball could be played.

In 1969, aided by Robert W. Kendler, the president-founder of the U.S. Handball Association (USHA), the International Racquetball Association (IRA) was founded using the name coined by Bob McInerney, a professional tennis player. That same year, the IRA assumed the national championship from the NPRA. In 1973, after a dispute with the IRA board of directors, Kendler formed a competing organization called the National Racquetball Club (NRC), which eventually became the dominant professional tour in the 1970s.For a period of time in the 1970s, the NRC and the IRA both offered competing "Amateur" and "Professional" tournaments, but by the late 1970s the NRC was focused on the professional game while the IRA became focused on the amateur side, and became recognized by the United States Olympic Committee as the official National Governing Body (NGB) of the sport.

The IRA was a founding member of the International Racquetball Federation (IRF). Eventually, the IRA became the American Amateur Racquetball Association (AARA); In late 1995, it renamed itself as the United States Racquetball Association (USRA). In 2003, the USRA again renamed itself to USA Racquetball (USAR), to mirror other Olympic sports associations, even though racquetball is not an Olympic sport.

Kendler used his publication ACE to promote both handball and racquetball. Starting in the 1970s, and aided by the fitness boom of that decade, the sport's popularity increased to an estimated 3.1 million players by 1974. Consequent to increased demand, racquetball clubs and courts were founded and built, and sporting goods manufacturers began producing racquetball-specific equipment. This growth continued until the early 1980s, and declining in the decade's latter part when racquet clubs converted to physical fitness clubs, in service to a wider clientele, adding aerobics exercise classes and physical fitness and bodybuilding machines. Since then, the number of players has remained steady, an estimated 5.6 million.

The NRC and Kendler ruled over professional racquetball throughout its early stages of growth, but upon his death in 1982 the organization declared bankruptcy and the professional men's tours fell into disarray. Several professional governing bodies ruled the Men's pro tour throughout the 1980s, and the Women broke away and self-organized their own professional tour in the same time period. Eventually, after the tour collapsed in the fall of 1988, a new men's tour called the International Racquetball Tour (IRT) was created by Oregon State President and popular tournament promotor Hank Marcus, which remains the primary men's professional sanctioning body to this day. The women's pro tour has gone by several names in the interim, but is currently known as the Ladies Professional Racquetball tour (LPRT) and has marketing partnerships with the USAR, IRT, and other sanctioning bodies to this day.

== United Kingdom ==
In 1976, Ian D.W. Wright created the sport of racketball based on U.S. racquetball. British racketball is played in a 32-foot (9.8 m) long by 21-foot (6.4 m) wide squash court—8 feet (2.4 m) shorter and 1 foot (0.30 m) wider than the U.S. racquetball court—using a smaller, less-dynamic ball than the American racquetball. In racketball, the ceiling is out-of-bounds. The racketball is served after a bounce on the floor then struck into play with the racket. Scoring is like squash with point-a-rally scoring of up to 11 points. The British Racketball Association was formed on 13 February 1984, and confirmed by the English Sports Council (now Sport England) as the sport's governing body on 30 October of the same year. The first National Racketball Championship was held in London on 1 December 1984. The sport is now played in countries where squash is played, Australia, Bermuda, France, Germany, Malaysia, the Netherlands, New Zealand, South Africa, Argentina, Ireland and Sweden. Currently, racketball is also played in parts of North America.

In 1988, the British Racketball Association merged with the Squash Rackets Association. England Squash & Racketball is now recognised by Sport England as the English national governing body for the sports of squash and racketball. There is now an established UK Racketball Tournament Series consisting of 8 events around the UK, which forms the basis of the national rankings along with the National Racketball championships held annually at the Edgbaston Priory Club.

In 2016, World Squash Federation began to 'rebrand' racketball as Squash 57, the 57 referring to the diameter of the ball in millimeters, in order to emphasize both its membership of the 'squash rackets' family, and its distinctiveness from the U.S. racquetball.

== Governing bodies ==
International Racquetball Federation
- Formation: 1949; 77 years ago / 1979
- Type: Sports federation
- Legal status: Governing body of racquetball
- Purpose: Sport governance
- Headquarters: Colorado Springs, US
- Region served: Worldwide
- Members: +80 national associations
- Main organ: Congress
- Affiliations: ARISF
- Website: Official website

The International Racquetball Federation (IRF) governs the World Racquetball Championships, which were first held in 1981 in conjunction with the first World Games. The second World Championships were played in 1984, and since then have been held biennially in August. Players from the United States have won the most World Championship titles.

The IRF also runs the World Junior Racquetball Championships that occur annually in either late October, or early to mid November, as well as the annual World Senior Racquetball Championships for players who are 35 years of age or older.

The sport has a high appeal in the Americas, and because of this racquetball has been included in the Pan American Games in 1995, 1999, 2003, 2011, 2015, 2019, and 2023. Racquetball has also been included in the World Games on seven occasions: 1981, 1985, 1993, 2009, 2013, 2022, and 2025. The International Racquetball Tour (IRT) is the men's professional organization, and the Ladies Professional Racquetball Tour (LPRT) is the women's professional organization, both starting in the 1980s.

The International Racquetball Federation (IRF) is the international sports federation, recognized by the IOC, that governs the sport of racquetball.

== Members ==
Central American and Caribbean region	South American region	North American region	Europe	Oceania	Africa	Asia
Antigua and Barbuda; Aruba; Bahamas; Barbados; Belize; Bermuda; British Virgin Islands; Cayman Islands; Costa Rica; Cuba; Dominican Republic; El Salvador; Guatemala; Haiti; Honduras; Jamaica; Nicaragua; Panama; Puerto Rico; Saint Kitts and Nevis; United States Virgin Islands	Argentina; Bolivia; Brazil; Chile; Colombia; Ecuador; Paraguay; Peru; Uruguay; Venezuela	Canada; Mexico; United States	Armenia; Austria; Basque Country; Catalonia; Czech Republic; Denmark; England; Finland; France; Germany; Greece; Hungary; Iceland; Ireland; Israel; Italy; Luxembourg; Moldova; Netherlands; Norway; Poland; Sweden; Switzerland; Turkey; Ukraine	American Samoa; Australia; Cook Islands; Fiji; Guam; New Zealand; Northern Mariana Islands; Palau; Samoa; Tonga	Cameroon; Egypt; Eritrea; Ghana; Nigeria; Sierra Leone; South Africa; Zimbabwe	American Samoa; Brunei; China; Chinese Taipei; Hong Kong; India; Indonesia; Iran; Iraq; Japan; South Korea; Kuwait; Laos; Lebanon; Malaysia; Nepal; Pakistan; Philippines; Saudi Arabia; Singapore; Tajikistan; United Arab Emirates; Vietnam

== Events ==
- Racquetball World Championships
- International Racquetball Tour
- Ladies Professional Racquetball Tour
- European Racquetball Championships
- Pan American Racquetball Championships
- Asian Racquetball Championships

== Equipment ==
This court and equipment are required for playing racquetball:

The court dimensions

- A racquetball court must be fully enclosed indoor or outdoor with a front wall. The standard racquetball court is rectangular: 40 feet long, 20 feet wide, and 20 feet high with red lines defining the service and serve reception areas. There are variations on the standard court with some courts having sidewalls that don't extend the full length of the court and some courts don't have any sidewalls.

The "service box" is formed by the short line (a solid red line running the court's width parallel to the front and back walls at a distance of 20 feet) and the service line (which runs parallel to the short line and is 15 feet from the front wall). Within the service box there are two sets of lines perpendicular to the short and service lines.

One set of lines is 18 inches from, and parallel to, the side walls. Along with the short line, service line, and side wall these lines define the doubles box, where the non-serving doubles partner stands during the serve; 36 inches from the side wall is another set of lines which, along with the short line and the service line, define an area that the server must not enter if he wishes to hit a drive serve between himself and the nearest side wall. The receiving line is a parallel dashed line 5 feet behind the short line.

Other equipment include:

- A racquetball; a dynamic (bouncy) rubber ball of 2.25 in. (57 mm) diameter
- A racquetball racquet; no longer than 22 inches
- Racquetball eyeguards (mandatory during competitions; some recreational players play without eyeguards but this is not recommended, as being hit in the eye by the ball can cause serious injury and/or permanent vision damage).

Racquetball differs from other racquet sports as most competitive players wear a glove on their racquet hand for the purpose of getting a better grip on the racquet (similar to golfers using a glove when driving), but gloves are optional equipment. Also, players usually wear comfortable short sleeved shirts and shorts, as well as racquetball court shoes designed for enabling quick lateral as well as forward and backward movement.

== Ball colors ==
Racquetballs are manufactured in a variety of colors such as blue, green, purple, black, red, and pink, and some are for specific purposes (e.g., outdoor play and indoor play), but the differences are unlikely to matter for recreational play. Beginners are recommended to use a blue ball by Penn, Ektelon, or Wilson. The blue ball is the most commonly used and is the most neutral ball for average speed and accuracy of contact. Green balls are similar to blue balls. In the United States the main choices of ball are blue and green for tournament play. In some cases the International Pro Racquetball Tour (IRT) will use a purple Penn HD ball as the official ball. A black ball is often used in tournaments for senior players because the ball is designed to be slower moving and allows for longer rallies. The red ball is the fastest in production, and they are known as Red Ektelon Fireballs. This ball is heavier and allows for a quicker pace.

Balls do break occasionally, and will lose their bounce over time even without breaking. To keep balls around for a long time it is best to keep them in a room temperature setting and keep them out of extreme cold or heat because this will cause the balls to become less effective and lose their bounce.

== Rules ==
Play begins with the serve. The serving player must bounce the ball on the floor once and hit it directly to the front wall, making the ball hit the floor beyond the short line; otherwise the serve counts as a fault. The ball may touch one side wall, but not two, prior to hitting the floor; hitting both side walls after the front wall (but before the floor) is a "three wall serve", and a fault. Also, serving the ball into the front wall so that it rebounds to the back wall without hitting the floor first is a long serve, and a fault.

Other fault serves include a ceiling serve, in which the ball touches the ceiling after the front wall, and serving before the receiving player is ready. Also, the server must wait until the ball passes the short line before stepping out of the service box, otherwise it is a fault serve.

If the server hits the ball directly to any surface other than the front wall the server immediately loses serve regardless of whether it was first or second serve.

After the ball bounces behind the short line, or passes the receiving line, the ball is in play and the opposing player(s) may play it.

Usually, the server is allowed two opportunities (called first serve and second serve) to put the ball into play (two serve rule), although elite level competitions often allow the server only one opportunity (one serve rule).

After a successful serve, players alternate hitting the ball against the front wall. The player returning the hit may allow the ball to bounce once on the floor or hit the ball on the fly. Once the player returning the shot has hit the ball, however, it must strike the front wall before striking the floor. Unlike during the serve, a ball in play may touch as many walls, including the ceiling, as necessary so long as it reaches the front wall without striking the floor.

=== Scoring ===
If the server wins the rally, then the server scores one point and continues to serve. If the opposing player wins the rally, then no point is scored, but that player then takes over serving.

Several different scoring methods have been or are used in the sport:

- Under USA Racquetball Amateur scoring rules, matches are best of three games with the first two games to 15 points and a third game to 11 points, if necessary. USA Racquetball rules do not require players to win by two, so a match score line could read 15–14, 14–15, 11–10.
- Racquetball Canada matches are also the best of three format two games to 15, tiebreaker to 11, but require a winning margin of at least two points.
- From 1981 to 2017, the IRT's scoring was best-of-five games to 11 points, requiring a two-point margin for victory, but by December 2017 the tour had modified their scoring methods to be in line with USAR and IRF standards at the time, and converted to the standard two games to 15, tiebreaker to 11 format.
- International competitions run by the International Racquetball Federation (IRF) also followed the two-games to 15, tiebreaker to 11 format from 1981 until 2022, when the international competitions were going to move to Rally Scoring. IRF competitions are now played at 3 of 5 games to 15, win by one except in the last game, with rally scoring. As part of 2022 World Games and World Juniors, IRF modified its rally scoring limits, consisting 3 out of 5 games to 11, win by two. The IRF cited several factors for this change: length of matches, confusing scoring system to casual fans, and the need for faster matches to accommodate more matches. IRF's pivot to rally scoring had an immediate reaction in the NGBs, as most IRF qualifying events in USAR, Racquetball Canada, and other NGBs are now played under the IRF's rally scoring rules.

=== Hinders ===
Due to the nature of the game, players often occupy the space their opponent(s) want(s) to occupy. This may result in a player blocking his opponent's ability to play the ball. Such occurrences are termed either hinders or penalty hinders. A hinder is a replay of the current rally (the server resumes play at the first serve), while a penalty hinder results in the player who caused the avoidable obstruction to lose the rally. A type of hinder is a screen in which the player is unable to see the ball prior to it passing the opponent.

The difference between a hinder and a penalty hinder (or formerly an avoidable hinder) is that in the latter case a player has missed out on a clear opportunity to make a rally-winning shot due to the obstruction by the player's opponent, while in the former case the opportunity missed would not clearly have led to a winning shot. This difference is almost always a judgment call by the referee (if available).

There is also a "court" hinder in which some part of the playing field caused the ball to bounce untrue. Often this is the door frame or (recessed) handle or a flaw in the floor or walls. In this case, the rally is a re-serve.

=== Game variations ===
Racquetball games can be played with two, three or four players, with doubles or singles matches being most common. Two player games are called singles or "one-up" (one vs. one for the entire game), while four player games are doubles with two pairs playing against each other (two vs. two for the entire game). Tournament competitions have divisions for singles or doubles or both.

Three-player games are most commonly called "Cut-throat" and sometimes "Ironman" (two-on-one for the entire game) where each player takes turns serving to the other two, who play as a team against the serving player. Another three-player game is "California", "In-and-Out", or "King of the Court" where play is 1 vs. 1 with the third player remaining in the back court out of play while the other two play a rally; the rally winner then serves to the player who was sitting out, and the rally loser stays out of play. Another three-player variation is "Sevens" in which one player plays against two players as a team, with the game being played to seven points; if the two player team gets to seven first, the game is over, but if the solo player gets to seven first then the game continues to 14. If the solo player again reaches 14 first, then the game continues to 21, where the game ends regardless of whether the solo player or the two player team reach 21 first.

== Shots of the game ==
=== Service ===
Serve style varies drastically from player to player. Generally, they are divided into two types: offensive and defensive. Most players use an offensive serve for the first serve, and a defensive serve if they need to hit a second serve. Of the offensive serves, the most common is the drive. The intention with this serve is for the ball to travel low and fast towards either back corner, and to bounce twice before striking either side wall or the back wall. If the opponent is adjusting to the drive serve, the server will throw in any variety of jam serves.

A jam serve is an offensive serve which attempts to catch the opponent off balance by making use of difficult angles and unfrequented play space. The most common jam serve is the Z-serve, which strikes the front wall close to a side wall. The ball bounces quickly off the side wall, then strikes the floor and then the opposite side wall about 30–35 feet back. Depending upon the spin the server gives the Z-serve, the resulting carom may prove unpredictable and difficult to return. Side spin may cause the ball to bounce parallel to the back wall.

A pinch serve is similar to a drive serve, but the ball strikes a side wall very low and close to the serving box. With the appropriate spin, the ball has little bounce, and is difficult to return. It is possible that a successful serve would strike the sidewall before the short line, and land on the floor after the short line.

If the player faults on the first serve, they will usually hit a defensive serve. Defensive serves do not usually garner aces, but they are designed to generate a weak return by the opponent, thereby setting up the server to win the point. Most defensive serves are any variety of lob serves. A plain lob serve is a ball hit with a long, high arch into either back corner. The goal is to hit the ball so that it lands as close as possible to the back wall, giving the opponent very little room to hit a solid return. A junk lob takes a shallower arch, and lands close to the side wall somewhere between the dotted line and the back wall. This lob is intended to deceive the opponent into thinking he has an easy kill, but since the ball is in the deep zone, it will more likely set up the server for an offensive shot.

=== Offensive shots ===
Straight-in shots are usually meant to hit the front wall as low as possible. If the ball contacts the front wall so low as to bounce twice before it reaches the service line it is called a "kill" shot. Straight-in shots are normally attempted with the idea of hitting toward the area of the court the opponent cannot cover.

Straight-in shots hit where the opponent cannot return them are called down-the-line and cross court passing shots. Often kill shots are returned very close to the back wall as the ball is moving towards the front wall.

Pinches and splats are shots that strike the side wall before the front wall. This often makes the ball bounce twice quickly to end the rally. Pinches normally strike the side wall towards the front part of the court, often within a few inches from the front wall.

The "splat" shot is an elongated pinch that strikes the side wall towards the back part of the court. It often makes a distinctive splatting sound. The advantage to a splat shot, beyond an unpredictable angle, is that it creates a longer distance to travel forward for the opponent who is held between a tension of going forward and staying back because of velocity of passing shots.

Pinches are classified as frontside or reverse. A right-handed player shooting a forehand shot to the right front corner is shooting a frontside pinch. A right-handed player shooting to the left front corner is a reverse pinch. A right-handed player shoots a backhand frontside pinch to the left corner and a reverse double pinch to the right corner. Everything for a left-handed player would be the opposite.

The dink is another effective offensive shot designed to end the point. It is a shot that goes very low to the front wall, struck very softly so that it bounces twice before the opponent can get to it. Dinks are most effective when the opponent is positioned deep in the court.

Another important shot type is the "Z" shot. This shot is effective at confusing and tiring out an opponent. To hit a "Z" shot one hits the side wall hard and up high causing the ball to hit the front then the other side wall then back to the original side wall. If done correctly, the path of the ball will be Z-shaped. This shot can have confusing bounces which can frustrate opponents. If done correctly, a "Z" shot will apply spin to the ball on the final bounce as well, causing it to rebound perpendicular to the second wall and fall parallel to the back wall, the closer the better. This makes the "Z" shot very difficult to return.

=== Defensive shots ===
Defensive shots are defined as shots which are not returned low to the front wall.

The ceiling ball shot is the primary defensive shot. This is a shot that strikes the ceiling at or near the front wall. The ball will bounce once in the forecourt and should then travel in a high arc to arrive as close to, and as vertical to, the back wall as possible. Often this is aimed at the corner which would require a backhand return by the opponent. This makes it difficult for the opponent to return the ball as he cannot make a full arc of the racquet. If the ball comes down too long or too short of the back wall, however, this can allow the opponent a kill shot.

Another defensive shot is the high Z. Used when the defensive player is near the front wall, the high Z is hit ten feet high or higher into the front wall near a corner. The ball then bounces from the side wall all the way to the opposite side wall, usually traveling over the top of the opponent, hitting the opposite side wall with spin. The spin will cause the ball to leave the opposite wall almost perpendicular to it. This may confuse inexperienced opponents but importantly, if very close to and parallel to the rear wall, makes for a difficult return shot.

The "around the world" or "3 wall" defensive shot is hit like a pinch shot but high on the wall toward the ceiling. It travels around the court in a high trajectory and is an alternative to hitting a ceiling ball.

Two other defensive shots are used but are less effective. If the defensive player is in the backcourt but unable to position himself for a non-defensive shot, he may need to hit the ball off of the back wall. The ball often returns without much force and is easily returned. The round-the-world shot is hit high into the side wall first so the ball then hits the front wall and then the other side wall, effectively circling the court. It can be easily cut off and is rarely used anymore.

== Strategy ==
The primary strategy of racquetball is to command the center of the court just at or behind the dashed receiving line. This allows the player to move as quickly as possible to all areas of the court and limit open court areas which are difficult to defend. After a shot, players should return quickly to center court. The antithesis of this is to be against a wall which severely limits the player's movement and allows the opponent an open court.

Important tactics include keeping an eye on the opponent by glancing sideways to anticipate their return shot, learning the typical return shots of the opponent, and attempting to not be predictable with return shots.

Other more obvious strategies are to keep the returned ball as low on the front wall as possible, keeping the ball moving fast (limiting reaction time) and to keep player's opponent moving away from center court by the use of lobs, cross court shots, and dinks.

== Major competitions and players ==
Organized competitive racquetball began in the 1970s. The best male players of that era were Charlie Brumfield and Marty Hogan, as well as Bud Muehleisen, Dan Southern, Jerry Hilecher, Steve Keeley, Davey Bledsoe, Steve Serot, and Steve Strandemo. Hogan continued to be a dominant player into the 1980s, and was rivaled on the scene by Brett Harnett, Dave Peck, and Mike Yellen.

In the 1990s, Ruben Gonzalez, Cliff Swain and Sudsy Monchik dominated pro tournaments, and other great players like Andy Roberts, John Ellis, and Drew Kachtik were often left out of the winner's circle. In the 2000s, Kane Waselenchuk, Jack Huczek, Jason Mannino, Ben Croft, and Rocky Carson have all excelled, but Waselenchuk has been dominant the last two seasons losing only once since September 2008.

The first great woman player was Peggy Steding in the 1970s. She was succeeded by Shannon Wright, who was then rivaled by Heather McKay, a great Australian squash player who made the transition to racquetball when living in Canada. McKay then developed a great rivalry with Lynn Adams, and after McKay moved back to Australia, Adams dominated women's racquetball for the better part of the 1980s.

The 1990s belonged to Michelle Gould (née Gilman) whose drive serve was a huge weapon against her opponents. In the late 1990s and into the 2000s, Jackie Paraiso and then Cheryl Gudinas were the dominant players. In the mid-2000s, Christie Van Hees and Rhonda Rajsich were the dominant players, but Paola Longoria finished #1 at the end of the 2008–2009 and 2009–2010 seasons.

The professional tours have been dominated by two players since the 2010 time frame. On the Men's side, Kane Waselenchuk has won 14 year-end #1 titles since 2004, which Paola Longoria has now won 13 year end pro titles dating to 2009, including the last 11 straight.

=== US Open ===
Held annually in October, the US Open is the most prestigious professional racquetball event. First held in 1996, the US Open was in Memphis, Tennessee until 2010, when it moved to Minneapolis, Minnesota. In men's play, Kane Waselenchuk (Canada) has won the most US Open titles with thirteen ahead of Sudsy Monchik (US) with four, while Jason Mannino (US) and Cliff Swain (US) have both won the title twice, and Rocky Carson (US) once.

In women's play, Paola Longoria (Mexico) has won five US Open titles, while Rhonda Rajsich (US) has four, one more than Christie Van Hees (Canada) with three. Michelle Gould (US), Cheryl Gudinas (US), and Jackie Paraiso (US) have each won two US Open titles. Kerri Wachtel (US) won the title once.

=== Other championships ===
Racquetball is included in the Pan American Games, World Games and Central American and Caribbean Games. Also, the regional associations of the International Racquetball Federation organize their own continental championships: Asian Championships, European Championships and Pan American Championships.

== Comparison to racketball ==
Racquetball is similar to the British sport of 'racketball', which was patterned on racquetball in 1976. The main differences are that the British ball is smaller, denser, and less bouncy; the British sport's court is a squash court, which is substantially shorter and somewhat wider; and the ceiling in the British game is out of bounds.

A racquetball court measures 20 feet wide, 20 feet high and 40 feet long, while a squash court is slightly smaller in height and length than a racquetball court, measuring 21 feet wide, 15 feet high and 32 feet long.

== See also ==
- American handball
- Eastern Collegiate Racquetball Conference
- Frontenis
- International Racquetball Tour
- Jai alai
- List of racquetball players
- One wall paddleball
- Racquets
- Squash
- Tennis ball
