= 2015 in racquetball =

This topic lists racquetball events for 2015.

- June 21, 2014 – June 19, 2015: 2014–2015 International Racquetball Tour

== Tier 1 and grand slam events ==
- September 18–21, 2014: Krowning Moment Bobcat Open in San Marcos, Texas
  - (Canada) Kane Waselenchuk defeated (United States) Rocky Carson 11–8, 7–11, 11–3, 11–2.
- September 25–28, 2014: Novasors Kansas City Open in Kansas City, Kansas
  - (Canada) Kane Waselenchuk defeated (United States) Rocky Carson 11–5, 11–2, 11–2.
- October 8–12, 2014: US Open Racquetball Championships in (Minnesota) Minneapolis
  - (Canada) Kane Waselenchuk defeated (Mexico) Álvaro Beltrán 11–6, 11–1, 11–6.
- October 16–19, 2014: Pete Pierce's St. Louis Party with the Pros in (Missouri) Saint Louis
  - (United States) Rocky Carson defeated (Mexico) Álvaro Beltrán 11–8, 11–9, 8–11, 11–6.
- November 6–9, 2014: Red Swain Shootout in Davison, Michigan
  - (United States) Rocky Carson defeated (Mexico) Álvaro Beltrán 12–10, 11–3, 4–11, 11–2.
- November 13–16, 2014: 24th Annual Turkey Shootout in Garden City, Kansas
  - (United States) Rocky Carson defeated (United States) Ben Croft 11–7, 9–11, 11–4, 11–9.
- December 11–14, 2014: ROLLOUT New Jersey Open in Warren
  - (Mexico) Daniel De La Rosa defeated (Mexico) Álvaro Beltrán 11–4, 11–6, 9–11, 12–10.
- January 15–18, 2015: NY Temperature Controls IRT Pro/Am in (New York (state)) Long Island City
  - (Canada) Kane Waselenchuk defeated (United States) Rocky Carson 11–4, 11–7, 11–6.
- January 22–25, 2015: Lewis Drug Pro/Am in Sioux Falls, South Dakota
  - (Canada) Kane Waselenchuk defeated (United States) Rocky Carson 11–5, 11–5, 11–1.
- February 26 – March 1, 2015: Florida IRT ProAm in Sarasota, Florida
  - (Canada) Kane Waselenchuk defeated (United States) Rocky Carson 11–8, 11–8, 14–12.
- March 12–15, 2015: 30th Annual Shamrock Shootout & IRT ProAm in Lombard, Illinois
  - (Canada) Kane Waselenchuk defeated (United States) Rocky Carson 11–8, 11–5, 11–3
- April 9–11, 2015: Long Beach Open Doubles in Long Beach, California
  - (Mexico) Álvaro Beltrán/ (United States) Rocky Carson defeated (Mexico) Daniel De La Rosa/ (United States) Jose Rojas 15–4, 15–6.
- April 30 – May 3, 2015: Krowning Moment Pro Invitational Internacional in Edinburg, Texas
  - (Canada) Kane Waselenchuk defeated (United States) Rocky Carson 11–4, 11–1, 11–3
- May 14–17, 2015: Pro Kennex Tournament of Champions in Portland, Oregon
  - (Canada) Kane Waselenchuk defeated (Mexico) Daniel De La Rosa 11–4, 11–1, 11–2

== Tier 1 and grand slam events ==
- August 15, 2014 – May 17, 2015: 2014–2015 Women's Pro tour
- August 15–17, 2014: Torneo Fenapo 2014 Paola Longoria in (Mexico) San Luis Potosí
  - (Mexico) Paola Longoria defeated (Argentina) Maria Jose Vargas 11–6, 12–10, 11–2.
  - (Mexico) Paola Longoria / Samantha Salas defeated (United States) Michelle Key / (Canada) Frédérique Lambert 4–15, 15–10, 11–2.
- September 11–14, 2014: 3WallBall World Championships in (Nevada) Las Vegas
  - (United States) Janel Tisinger defeated (Mexico) Jessica Parrilla 15–10, 15–10.
  - (United States) Michelle Key / Rhonda Rajsich defeated (United States) Jackie Paraiso / (Mexico) Jessica Parrilla 15–14, 12–15, 11–4.
- September 19–21, 2014:Albiertos Mexicano de Raquetas in (Mexico) Huixquilucan de Degollado
  - (Mexico) Paola Longoria defeated (Argentina) Maria Jose Vargas 11–8, 2–11, 11–3, 11–7.
- October 8–12, 2014: UnitedHealthcare US Open in (Minnesota) Minneapolis
  - (Mexico) Paola Longoria defeated (Argentina) Maria Jose Vargas 11–5, 11–3, 11–8.
  - (Mexico) Paola Longoria / (Ecuador) Veronica Sotomayor defeated (Argentina) Maria Jose Vargas / (United States) Rhonda Rajsich 15–7, 12–15, 11–7.
- October 17–19, 2014: Ektelon Stockton Pro-Am in Stockton, California
  - (United States) Rhonda Rajsich defeated (Mexico) Paola Longoria 11–9, 5–11, 14–12, 5–11, 11–4.
- December 5–7, 2014: Paola Longoria Invitational in (Mexico) Monterrey
  - (Mexico) Paola Longoria defeated (United States) Rhonda Rajsich 11–4, 11–9, 11–5.
  - (Mexico) Paola Longoria / Samantha Salas defeated (Ecuador) Maria Paz Munoz / Veronica Sotomayor 15–10, 15–14.
- December 12–14, 2014: 23rd Annual Christmas Classic in Arlington County, Virginia
  - (Argentina) Maria Jose Vargas defeated (United States) Rhonda Rajsich 5–11, 11–7, 11–7, 13–11.
  - (Argentina) Maria Jose Vargas / (United States) Rhonda Rajsich defeated (Mexico) Alexandra Herrera / Samantha Salas 11–15, 15–7, 11–7.
- January 23–25, 2015: Mercedes-Benz of Cincinnati Pro-Am in (Ohio) Cincinnati
  - (Mexico) Paola Longoria defeated (Argentina) Maria Jose Vargas 12–10, 11–7, 11–5.
  - (Mexico) Paola Longoria / Samantha Salas defeated (Argentina) Maria Jose Vargas / (United States) Rhonda Rajsich 15–9, 12–15, 11–9.
- February 20–22, 2015: Winter Classic Presented by NextPage in Overland Park, Kansas
  - (Mexico) Paola Longoria defeated (United States) Rhonda Rajsich 11–1, 11–2, 11–4.
- March 6–8, 2015: ROLLOUT New Jersey Open in Warren County, New Jersey
  - (Argentina) Maria Jose Vargas defeated (Canada) Frédérique Lambert 7–11, 11–6, 11–7, 11–3.
- March 20–22, 2015: California/Nevada State Singles in Fountain Valley, California
  - (Mexico) Paola Longoria defeated (Argentina) Maria Jose Vargas 11–6, 11–6, 11–6.
  - (Mexico) Paola Longoria / Samantha Salas defeated (Colombia) Cristina Amaya / (Mexico) Sophia Rascon 15–12, 15–13.
- April 3–5, 2015: AZ WOR VII – The Final Battle in Glendale, Arizona
  - Winner: (United States) Michelle Key
- April 16–19, 2015: Mile High Pro Am in (Colorado) Denver
  - (Mexico) Paola Longoria defeated (Argentina) Maria Jose Vargas 11–9, 11–1, 11–1.
- April 24–26, 2015: Battle at the Alamo in (Texas) San Antonio
  - (Mexico) Paola Longoria defeated (Argentina) Maria Jose Vargas 11–7, 11–9, 5–11, 11–2.
  - (Mexico) Paola Longoria / Samantha Salas defeated (United States) Michelle Key / (Canada) Frédérique Lambert.

== Continental championships ==
- March 21 & 22: 2015 Asia Racquetball Championships in (South Korea) Goyang
- March April 28–4: Racquetball PARC American Championships 2015 in (Dominican Republic) Santo Domingo
  - Men's Singles: (United States) Jose Diaz
  - Women's Singles: (Mexico) Paola Longoria
  - Men's Doubles: (Mexico) Álvaro Beltrán / Javier Moreno
  - Women's Doubles: (Mexico) Paola Longoria / Samantha Salas
- June 22–27: European Championships in (Germany) Hamburg
  - Men's winner: (Germany) Oliver Bertels
  - Women's winner: (United States) Andrea Gordon
  - Women's Doubles winners: (United States) Andrea Gordon/Lara Ludwig
  - Men's Doubles winners: (Germany) Arne Schmitz/Oliver Bertels
