= Racquetball at the 2011 Pan American Games – Women's team =

Racquetball – Women's team at the 2011 Pan American Games
- Venue: Racquetball Complex
- Dates: October 23–25

Medalists
Gold medal	Mexico
Silver medal	United States
Bronze medal	Ecuador
Bronze medal	Bolivia

The women's team competition of the racquetball events at the 2011 Pan American Games will be held from October 23 to 25 at the Racquetball Complex in Guadalajara, Mexico.

== Draw ==
Round of 16
Argentina	2	0	1
Venezuela	0	2	2

Quarterfinals
Mexico	2	2
Venezuela	0	0
Ecuador	2	1	2
Canada	0	2	1
Bolivia	2	2
Chile	0	0
Dominican Republic	0	0
United States	2	2

Semifinals
Mexico	2	2
Ecuador (bronze)	0	0
Bolivia (bronze)	0	0
United States	2	2

Final
Mexico (gold)	2	2
United States (silver)	1	0

== Results ==
=== Round of 16 ===
23 October; 10:15	Report	Argentina	1–2	Venezuela	Squash Complex; Referee(s): Cesar Valdez (MEX)
Score by game:
Veronique Guillemette	2–0	Ishley Paredes
Dafne Macrino	0–2	Mariana Tobon
Dafne Macrino/Veronique Guillemette	1–2	Mariana Tobon/Ishley Paredes

=== Quarterfinals ===
23 October; 15:15	Report	Mexico	2–0	Venezuela	Squash Complex; Referee(s): Cesar Farell (URU), Jorge Rodriguez (CRC)
Score by game:
Samantha Salas	2–0	Mariana Tobon
Paola Longoria/Samantha Salas	2–0	Ishley Paredes/Mariana Tobon

23 October; 11:30	Report	Ecuador	2–1	Canada	Squash Complex; Referee(s): Miguel Santiago (PUR), Adolfo Orellana (CRC)
Score by game:
María Muñoz	2–0	Jennifer Saunders
María Córdova	1–2	Frederique Lambert
María Muñoz/María Córdova	2–1	Brandi Jacobson/Jennifer Saunders

23 October; 12:45	Report	Bolivia	2–0	Chile	Squash Complex; Referee(s): Miguel Santiago (PUR), Carlos Ruiz (VEN)
Score by game:
María Vargas	2–0	Carla Muñoz
Cintia Loma/Jenny Daza	2–0	Angela Grisar/Carla Muñoz

23 October; 11:30	Report	Dominican Republic	0–2	United States	Squash Complex; Referee(s): Martha Jarrin (ECU)
Score by game:
Yira Portes	0–2	Cheryl Gudinas
Yira Portes/Claudine García	0–2	Aimee Ruiz/Rhonda Rajsich

=== Semifinals ===
24 October; 14:30	Report	Mexico	2–0	Ecuador (bronze)	Squash Complex; Referee(s): Cesar Farell (URU)
Score by game:
Paola Longoria	2–0	María Muñoz
Paola Longoria/Samantha Salas	2–0	María Córdova/María Muñoz

24 October; 14:30	Report	(bronze) Bolivia	0–2	United States	Squash Complex; Referee(s): Jorge Rodriguez (CRC)
Score by game:
Cintia Loma	0–2	Rhonda Rajsich
Cintia Loma/Jenny Daza	0–2	Rhonda Rajsich/Aimee Ruiz

=== Final ===
25 October; 14:30	Report	(gold) Mexico	2–0	United States (silver)	Squash Complex; Referee(s): Ricky Mattson (CAN)
Score by game:
Paola Longoria	2–1	Rhonda Rajsich
Samantha Salas	2–0	Cheryl Gudinas
