= Racquetball at the 2015 Pan American Games – Women's doubles =

Racquetball – Women's doubles at the 2015 Pan American Games
- Venue: Exhibition Centre – Hall C
- Dates: July 19 - July 24
- Competitors: 20 from 10 nations

Medalists
Gold medal	Paola Longoria; Samantha Salas	Mexico
Silver medal	Maria Jose Vargas; Veronique Guillemette	Argentina
Bronze medal	Maria Sotomayor; María Muñoz	Ecuador
Bronze medal	Rhonda Rajsich; Kim Russell	United States

The women's doubles competition of the racquetball events at the 2015 Pan American Games was held from July 19–24 at the Direct Energy Centre (Exhibition Centre), in Toronto, Canada. The defending Pan American Games champion are Paola Longoria and Samantha Salas of the Mexico.

== Schedule ==
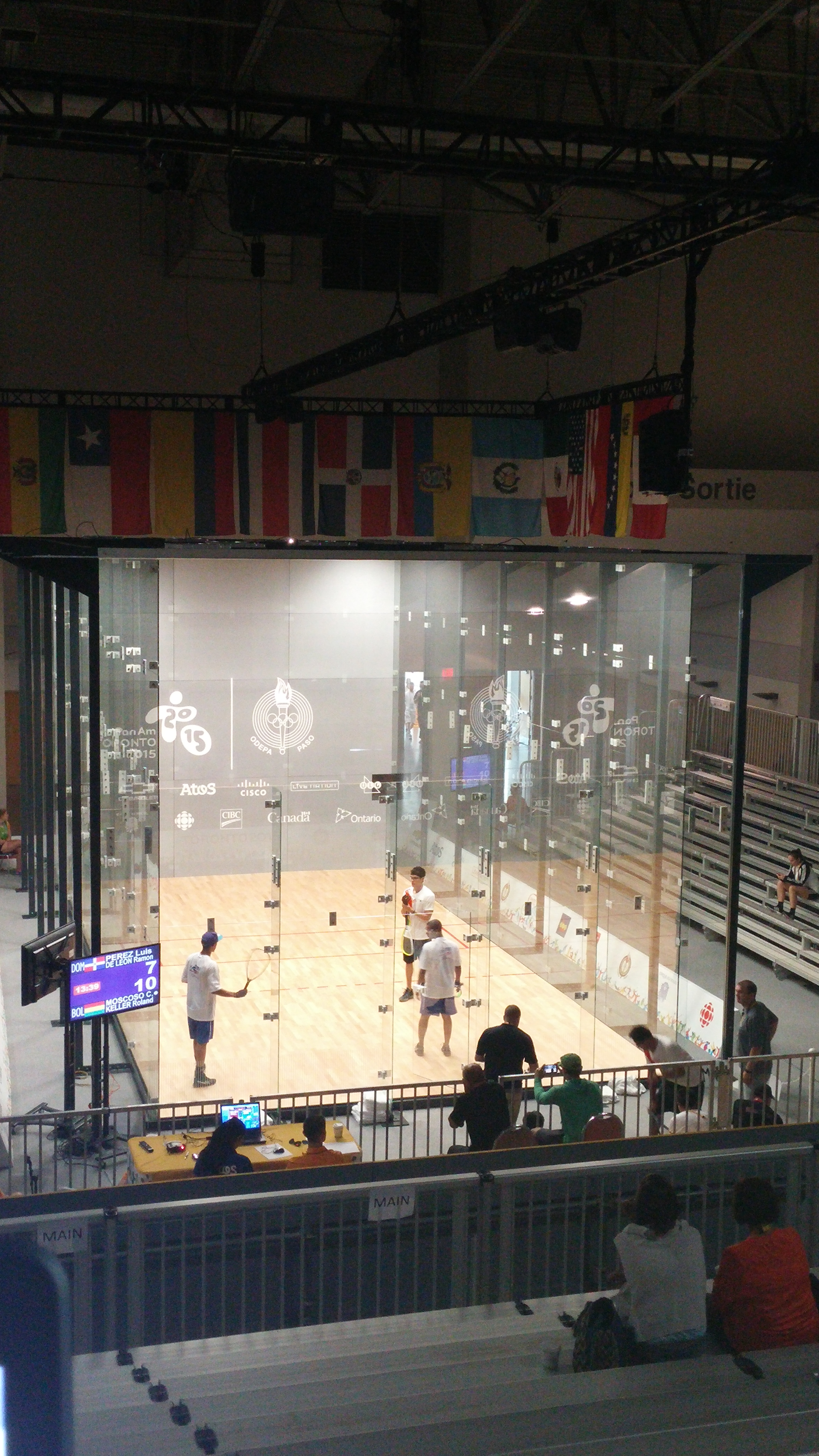
The Direct Energy Centre (Exhibition Centre), Hall C, was the venue for the racquetball competitions

All times are Central Standard Time (UTC-6).

Date	Time	Round
July 19, 2015	17:15	Round Robin
July 20, 2015	17:05	Round Robin
July 21, 2015	17:15	Round Robin
July 22, 2015	11:45	First Round
July 23, 2015	11:15	Quarterfinals
July 23, 2015	19:15	Semifinals
July 24, 2015	12:40	Final

== Round robin ==
The round robin will be used as a qualification round. Groups was announced at the technical meeting the day before the competition begins.

=== Pool A ===
Player	Nation	Pld	W	L	Points
Paola Longoria & Samantha Salas	Mexico	2	2	0	4
Maria Sotomayor & María Muñoz	Ecuador	2	1	1	3
Angela Grisar & Carla Muñoz	Chile	2	0	2	2

=== Pool B ===
Player	Nation	Pld	W	L	Points
Rhonda Rajsich & Kim Russell	United States	2	2	0	4
Maria Jose Vargas & Veronique Guillemette	Argentina	2	1	1	3
Gabriela Martinez & Maria Rodriguez	Guatemala	2	0	2	2

=== Pool C ===
Player	Nation	Pld	W	L	Points
Cristina Amaya & María Gómez	Colombia	3	3	0	6
Mariana Tobon & Mariana Paredes	Venezuela	3	2	1	5
Carola Loma & Natalia Mendez	Bolivia	3	1	2	4
Michele Morissette & Christine Richardson	Canada	3	0	3	3

== Playoffs ==
First Round
Carola Loma (Bolivia) Natalia Mendez (BOL)	15	11	11
Gabriela Martinez (Guatemala) Maria Rodriguez (GUA)	10	15	5
Angela Grisar (Chile) Carla Muñoz (CHI)	15	15
Michele Morissette (Canada) Christine Richardson (CAN)	5	4

Quarterfinals
Paola Longoria (Mexico) Samantha Salas (MEX)	15	15
Carola Loma (Bolivia) Natalia Mendez (BOL)	9	0
Maria Sotomayor (Ecuador) María Muñoz (ECU)	15	15
Mariana Tobon (Venezuela) Mariana Paredes (VEN)	0	7
Cristina Amaya (Colombia) María Gómez (COL)	12	15	7
Maria Jose Vargas (Argentina) Veronique Guillemette (ARG)	15	9	11
Angela Grisar (Chile) Carla Muñoz (CHI)	15	10	8
Rhonda Rajsich (United States) Kim Russell (USA)	6	15	11

Semifinals
Paola Longoria (Mexico) Samantha Salas (MEX)	15	15
Maria Sotomayor (Ecuador) María Muñoz (ECU)	10	12
Maria Jose Vargas (Argentina) Veronique Guillemette (ARG)	15	13	11
Rhonda Rajsich (United States) Kim Russell (USA)	7	15	6

Final
Paola Longoria (Mexico) Samantha Salas (MEX)	15	15
Maria Jose Vargas (Argentina) Veronique Guillemette (ARG)	3	4
