= Racquetball at the 2023 Pan American Games – Women's singles =

Women's singles at the 2023 Pan American Games
- Venue: Racket Sports Center
- Dates: October 21 - October 24
- Competitors: 22 from 11 nations

Medalists
Gold medal	Paola Longoria	Mexico
Silver medal	Montserrat Mejia	Mexico
Bronze medal	Maria Jose Vargas	Argentina
Bronze medal	Maricruz Ortiz	Costa Rica

The women's singles competition of the racquetball events at the 2023 Pan American Games will be held from October 21 to 24 at Racket Sports Center in Santiago, Chile.

== Schedule ==
Date	Time	Round
October 21, 2023	11:30	Round of 32
October 22, 2023	10:00	Round of 16
October 23, 2023	10:45	Quarterfinals
October 23, 2023	13:00	Semifinals
October 24, 2023	10:00	Finals

== Results ==
Round of 32 (October 21)
Frédérique Lambert (CAN)	3
Paula Mansilla (CHI)	0
Samira Ferrer (CUB)	0
Michelle Key (USA)	3
Verónica Sotomayor (ECU)	3
María Céspedes (DOM)	0
Merynanyelly Delgado (DOM)	3
María José Muñoz (ECU)	2
Erika Manilla (USA)	3
Kylie Larduet (CUB)	0
Carla Muñoz (CHI)	3
Michelle Morissette (CAN)	0

Round of 16 (October 22)
Natalia Méndez (ARG)	3
Frédérique Lambert (CAN)	1
Maricruz Ortiz (CRC)	3
María Rodríguez (EAI)	0
Angélica Barrios (BOL)	3
Michelle Key (USA)	0
Verónica Sotomayor (ECU)	1
Montserrat Mejía (MEX)	3
Paola Longoria (MEX)	3
Merynanyelly Delgado (DOM)	0
Erika Manilla (USA)	3
Yasmine Sabja (BOL)	1
Gabriela Martínez (EAI)	3
Jimena Gomez (CRC)	0
Carla Muñoz (CHI)	2
María José Vargas (ARG)	3

Quarterfinals (October 23)
Natalia Méndez (ARG)	2
Maricruz Ortiz (CRC)	3
Angélica Barrios (BOL)	1
Montserrat Mejía (MEX)	3
Paola Longoria (MEX)	3
Erika Manilla (USA)	0
Gabriela Martínez (EAI)	0
María José Vargas (ARG)	3

Semifinals (October 23)
Maricruz Ortiz (CRC)	0
Montserrat Mejía (MEX)	3
Paola Longoria (MEX)	3
María José Vargas (ARG)	1

Final (October 24)
Montserrat Mejía (MEX)	0
Paola Longoria (MEX)	3
