= Racquetball at the 2015 Pan American Games – Women's singles =

Racquetball – Women's singles at the 2015 Pan American Games
- Venue: Exhibition Centre – Hall C
- Dates: July 19 - July 24
- Competitors: 20 from 10 nations

Medalists
| Gold medal | Paola Longoria | Mexico |
| Silver medal | Maria Jose Vargas | Argentina |
| Bronze medal | Rhonda Rajsich | United States |
| Bronze medal | Maria Sotomayor | Ecuador |

The women's singles competition of the racquetball events at the 2015 Pan American Games was held from July 19–24 at the Direct Energy Centre (Exhibition Centre), in Toronto, Canada. The defending Pan American Games champion is Paola Longoria of the Mexico.

== Schedule ==
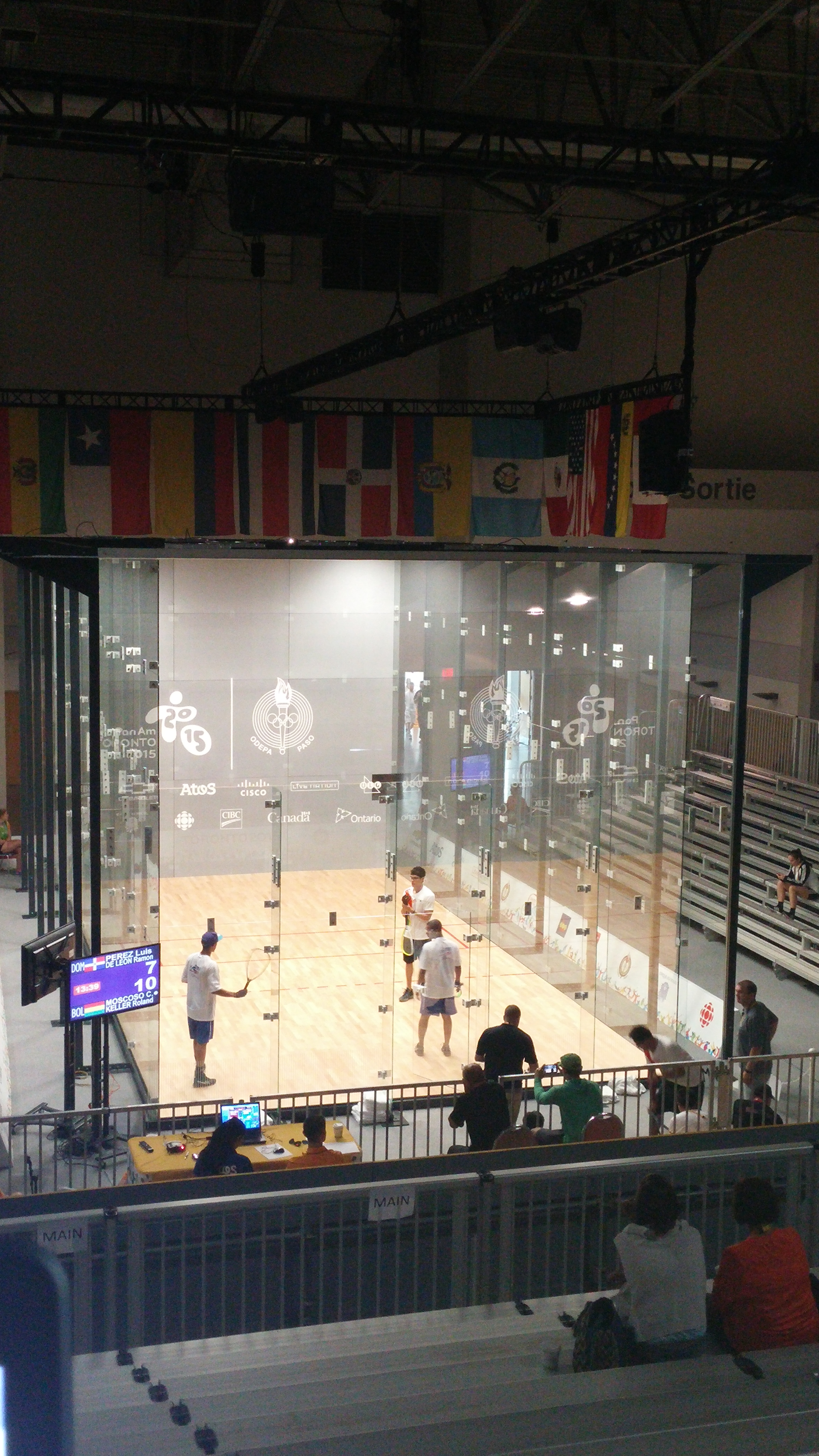
The Direct Energy Centre (Exhibition Centre), Hall C, was the venue for the racquetball competitions

All times are Central Standard Time (UTC-6).

| Date | Time | Round |
|---|---|---|
| July 19, 2015 | 9:05 | Round Robin |
| July 20, 2015 | 9:05 | Round Robin |
| July 21, 2015 | 9:05 | Round Robin |
| July 22, 2015 | 9:00 | First Round |
| July 22, 2015 | 17:50 | Second Round |
| July 23, 2015 | 9:00 | Quarterfinals |
| July 23, 2015 | 17:00 | Semifinals |
| July 24, 2015 | 19:38 | Final |

== Round robin ==
The round robin will be used as a qualification round. Groups was announced at the technical meeting the day before the competition begins.

=== Pool A ===
| Player | Nation | Pld | W | L | Points |
|---|---|---|---|---|---|
| Paola Longoria | Mexico | 3 | 3 | 0 | 6 |
| Cristina Amaya | Colombia | 3 | 2 | 1 | 5 |
| Mariana Paredes | Venezuela | 3 | 1 | 2 | 4 |
| Maria Rodriguez | Guatemala | 3 | 0 | 3 | 3 |

=== Pool B ===
| Player | Nation | Pld | W | L | Points |
|---|---|---|---|---|---|
| Maria Sotomayor | Ecuador | 3 | 3 | 0 | 6 |
| Jennifer Saunders | Canada | 3 | 2 | 1 | 5 |
| Mariana Tobon | Venezuela | 3 | 1 | 2 | 4 |
| María Gómez | Colombia | 3 | 0 | 3 | 3 |

=== Pool C ===
| Player | Nation | Pld | W | L | Points |
|---|---|---|---|---|---|
| Samantha Salas | Mexico | 3 | 3 | 0 | 6 |
| Adriana Riveros | Bolivia | 3 | 2 | 1 | 5 |
| Michelle Key | United States | 3 | 1 | 2 | 4 |
| Gabriela Martinez | Guatemala | 3 | 0 | 3 | 3 |

=== Pool D ===
| Player | Nation | Pld | W | L | Points |
|---|---|---|---|---|---|
| Frédérique Lambert | Canada | 3 | 3 | 0 | 6 |
| Maria Jose Vargas | Argentina | 3 | 2 | 1 | 5 |
| María Muñoz | Ecuador | 3 | 1 | 2 | 4 |
| Angela Grisar | Chile | 3 | 0 | 3 | 2 |

=== Pool E ===
| Player | Nation | Pld | W | L | Points |
|---|---|---|---|---|---|
| Rhonda Rajsich | United States | 3 | 3 | 0 | 6 |
| Carola Loma | Bolivia | 3 | 2 | 1 | 5 |
| Carla Muñoz | Chile | 3 | 1 | 2 | 4 |
| Veronique Guillemette | Argentina | 3 | 0 | 3 | 1 |

== Playoffs ==
=== Finals ===
| Semifinals | | | Final |
| Paola Longoria (MEX) | 15 | 15 |
| Rhonda Rajsich (USA) | 13 | 9 | Paola Longoria (MEX) | 15 | 15 |
| Maria Jose Vargas (ARG) | 15 | 15 | Maria Jose Vargas (ARG) | 12 | 9 |
| Maria Sotomayor (ECU) | 7 | 1 |

=== Top half ===
First Round
Angela Grisar (CHI)
Gabriela Martinez (GUA) | WO
Mariana Tobon (VEN) | 15 | 4 | 11
Maria Rodriguez (GUA) | 14 | 15 | 3

Second Round
Paola Longoria (MEX) | 15 | 15
Gabriela Martinez (GUA) | 3 | 6
Jennifer Saunders (CAN) | 9 | 1
Carola Loma (BOL) | 15 | 15
Rhonda Rajsich (USA) | 15 | 15
Michelle Key (USA) | 8 | 7
Mariana Tobon (VEN) | 2 | 3
Frédérique Lambert (CAN) | 15 | 15

Quarterfinals
Paola Longoria (MEX) | 15 | 15
Carola Loma (BOL) | 1 | 2
Rhonda Rajsich (USA) | 15 | 9 | 11
Frédérique Lambert (CAN) | 9 | 15 | 7

Semifinals
Paola Longoria (MEX) | 15 | 15
Rhonda Rajsich (USA) | 13 | 9

=== Bottom half ===
First Round
María Gómez (COL) | 9 | 13
Carla Muñoz (CHI) | 15 | 15
María Muñoz (ECU) | WO
Veronique Guillemette (ARG)

Second Round
Samantha Salas (MEX) | WO
Carla Muñoz (CHI)
Mariana Paredes (VEN) | 1 | 11
Maria Jose Vargas (ARG) | 15 | 15
Adriana Riveros (BOL) | 5 | 2
Cristina Amaya (COL) | 15 | 15
María Muñoz (ECU) | 0 | 10
Maria Sotomayor (ECU) | 15 | 15

Quarterfinals
Samantha Salas (MEX) | 10 | 7
Maria Jose Vargas (ARG) | 15 | 15
Cristina Amaya (COL) | 11 | 13
Maria Sotomayor (ECU) | 15 | 15

Semifinals
Maria Jose Vargas (ARG) | 15 | 15
Maria Sotomayor (ECU) | 7 | 1
