= 2018 Racquetball World Championships – Women's singles =

- XIX Racquetball World Championships: Costa Rica 2018 -
Host	San José, Costa Rica
Dates	August 10–18
- Men's singles
- Women's singles
Gold	(Guatemala) Gabriela Martinez
Silver	(Mexico) Paola Longoria
Bronze	(Argentina) Natalia Mendez (Argentina) Maria Jose Vargas
- Men's doubles
- Women's doubles

The International Racquetball Federation's 19th Racquetball World Championships were held in San José, Costa Rica from August 10 to 18. This was the first time Worlds had been in Costa Rica, and the first time a Central American country hosted the event.

In 2016, Mexican Paola Longoria won her third World Championship in women's singles, which tied her with Cheryl Gudinas and Michelle Gould for most World Championships in women's singles. Gabriela Martinez of Guatemala was Longoria's opponent in the final, and she was a surprise finalist, as she was only 16 years old, although she was the World Junior Champion in girl's U16. Also, neither American player - Michelle Key or Rhonda Rajsich - made the podium, which was the first time an American woman had not finished in the top three in World Championship history.

== Tournament format ==
The 2018 World Championships used a two-stage format with an initial group stage that was a round robin with the results used to seed players for a medal round.

== Group stage ==
=== Pool A ===
Player	Pld	W	L	GF	GA	PF	PA	Points
(Mexico) Paola Longoria	2	2	0	4	0	60	14	4
(South Korea) Jin Seok	2	1	1	2	2	33	38	3
(Japan) Harumi Kajino	2	0	2	0	4	12	53	2

=== Pool B ===
Player	Pld	W	L	GF	GA	PF	PA	Points
(United States) Rhonda Rajsich	2	2	0	4	0	60	11	4
(Japan) Naomi Wakimoto	2	1	1	2	3	43	51	3
(South Korea) Young Ock Lee	2	0	2	1	4	27	68	2

=== Pool C ===
Player	Pld	W	L	GF	GA	PF	PA	Points
(Mexico) Samantha Salas	3	3	0	6	1	98	32	6
(Chile) Carla Muñoz	3	2	1	4	3	78	73	5
(Bolivia) Jenny Daza	3	1	2	4	4	77	89	4
(Republic of Ireland) Donna Ryder	3	0	3	0	6	31	90	3

=== Pool D ===
Player	Pld	W	L	GF	GA	PF	PA	Points
(Guatemala) María Renee Rodríguez	3	3	0	6	2	101	64	6
(United States) Sheryl Lotts	3	2	1	5	2	85	65	5
(Republic of Ireland) Aisling Hickey	3	1	2	3	4	77	81	4
(Venezuela) Lilian Zea	3	0	3	0	6	29	90	3

=== Pool E ===
Player	Pld	W	L	GF	GA	PF	PA	Points
(Bolivia) Yasmine Sabja	3	3	0	6	0	90	30	6
(Canada) Frédérique Lambert	3	2	1	4	2	82	54	5
(Dominican Republic) Alejandra Jiménez	3	1	2	2	4	59	68	4
(Chile) Josefa Parada	3	0	3	0	6	11	90	3

=== Pool F ===
Player	Pld	W	L	GF	GA	PF	PA	Points
(Guatemala) Gabriela Martinez	3	3	0	6	0	90	25	6
(Colombia) Adriana Riveros	3	2	1	4	2	70	59	5
(Argentina) Maria Jose Vargas	3	1	2	2	4	60	64	4
(Costa Rica) Maricruz Ortiz	3	0	3	0	6	18	90	3

=== Pool G ===
Player	Pld	W	L	GF	GA	PF	PA	Points
(Argentina) Natalia Mendez	3	3	0	6	0	90	28	6
(Colombia) Cristina Amaya	3	2	1	4	2	54	47	5
(Dominican Republic) Merynanyelly Delgado	3	1	2	2	5	49	90	4
(Canada) Jen Saunders	3	0	3	1	6	44	77	3

== Medal round ==
Round of 32
1	(Mexico) Paola Longoria
32	BYE
17	(Bolivia) Jenny Daza	15, 15
16	(South Korea) Young Ock Lee	0, 6
9	(Colombia) Adriana Riveros	15, 15
24	(Chile) Josefa Parada	0, 4
25	(Venezuela) Lilian Zea	1, 4
8	(Colombia) Cristina Amaya	15, 15
5	(Bolivia) Yasmine Sabja
BYE
21	(Dominican Republic) Merynanyelly Delgado	12, 7
12	(Chile) Carla Muñoz	15, 15
13	(Japan) Naomi Wakimoto	9, 4
20	(Argentina) Maria Jose Vargas	15, 15
29	BYE
4	(Guatemala) María Renee Rodríguez
3	(Mexico) Samantha Salas
30	BYE
19	(Dominican Republic) Alejandra Jiménez	8, 9
14	(South Korea) Jin Seok	15, 15
11	(United States) Sheryl Lotts	10, 1
22	(Canada) Jen Saunders	15, 15
27	BYE
6	(Guatemala) Gabriela Martinez
7	(Argentina) Natalia Mendez	15, 15
26	(Republic of Ireland) Donna Ryder	2, 2
23	(Costa Rica) Maricruz Ortiz	4, 5
10	(Canada) Frédérique Lambert	15, 15
15	(Japan) Harumi Kajino	12, 15, 11
18	(Republic of Ireland) Aisling Hickey	15, 11, 8
31	BYE
2	(United States) Rhonda Rajsich

Round of 16
1	(Mexico) Paola Longoria	15, 15
17	(Bolivia) Jenny Daza	2, 11
9	(Colombia) Adriana Riveros	15, 11, 11
8	(Colombia) Cristina Amaya	6, 15, 9
5	(Bolivia) Yasmine Sabja	7, 15, 11
(Chile) Carla Muñoz	15, 4, 6
20	(Argentina) Maria Jose Vargas	14, 15, 11
4	(Guatemala) María Renee Rodríguez	15, 1, 5
3	(Mexico) Samantha Salas	15, 15
14	(South Korea) Jin Seok	3, 3
22	(Canada) Jen Saunders	2, 5
6	(Guatemala) Gabriela Martinez	15, 15
7	(Argentina) Natalia Mendez	15, 15
10	(Canada) Frédérique Lambert	8, 8
15	(Japan) Harumi Kajino	7, 5
2	(United States) Rhonda Rajsich	15, 15

Quarterfinals
1	(Mexico) Paola Longoria	15, 15
9	(Colombia) Adriana Riveros	7, 1
5	(Bolivia) Yasmine Sabja	2, 7
20	(Argentina) Maria Jose Vargas	15, 15
3	(Mexico) Samantha Salas	4, 12
6	(Guatemala) Gabriela Martinez	15, 15
7	(Argentina) Natalia Mendez	15, 15
2	(United States) Rhonda Rajsich	1, 13

Semi finals
1	(Mexico) Paola Longoria	6, 15, 11
20	(Argentina) Maria Jose Vargas	15, 2, 7
6	(Guatemala) Gabriela Martinez	15, 15
7	(Argentina) Natalia Mendez	8, 3

Finals
1	(Mexico) Paola Longoria	15, 6, 6
6	(Guatemala) Gabriela Martinez	8, 15, 11

Women's singles Winner
(Guatemala) Gabriela Martinez
