= Racquetball at the 2013 World Games – Women's singles =

2013 World Games - Racquetball women's singles
| Host | (Colombia) Cali |
| Dates | July 26–28, 2013 |
| Teams | 16 |
Podium
| Champions | (Mexico) Paola Longoria |
| Runners-up | (Colombia) Cristina Amaya |
| Third place | (United States) Rhonda Rajsich |
| Fourth place | (United States) Cheryl Gudinas |

The Racquetball - Women's Singles competition at the World Games 2013 takes place from July 26 to 28, 2013 at the Cañasgordas Club in Cali, Colombia. Players qualified for this event from their performances at the 2012 Racquetball World Championships.

== Women's Singles ==
Round of 16
1 | (Mexico) Paola Longoria | 15 | 15
16 | (Colombia) Carolina Gomez | 1 | 4
9 | (Bolivia) Carola Loma | 15 | 15
8 | (South Korea) Jung Eun Ane | 9 | 12
5 | (Chile) Angela Grisar | 12 | 15 | 11
12 | (Costa Rica) Melania Sauma | 15 | 13 | 3
13 | (Dominican Republic) Claudine Garcia | 14 | 10
4 | (United States) Rhonda Rajsich | 15 | 15
3 | (United States) Cheryl Gudinas | 15 | 15
14 | (Venezuela) Mariana Tobon | 4 | 2
11 | (Chile) Carla Muñoz | 5 | 11
6 | (Mexico) Jessica Parrilla | 15 | 15
7 | (Japan) Naomi Wakimoto | 15 | 15
10 | (Japan) Toshiko Sakimoto | 8 | 5
15 | (Colombia) Cristina Amaya | 15 | 15
2 | (Canada) Jennifer Saunders | 4 | 14

Quarter finals
1 | (Mexico) Paola Longoria | 15 | 15
9 | (Bolivia) Carola Loma | 2 | 8
5 | (Chile) Angela Grisar | 14 | 12
4 | (United States) Rhonda Rajsich | 15 | 15
3 | (United States) Cheryl Gudinas | 10 | 15 | 11
6 | (Mexico) Jessica Parrilla | 15 | 8 | 8
7 | (Japan) Naomi Wakimoto | 15 | 6 | 2
15 | (Colombia) Cristina Amaya | 10 | 15 | 11

Semi finals
1 | (Mexico) Paola Longoria | 15 | 15
4 | (United States) Rhonda Rajsich | 8 | 14
3 | (United States) Cheryl Gudinas | 12 | 15 | 3
15 | (Colombia) Cristina Amaya | 15 | 8 | 11

Finals
1 | (Mexico) Paola Longoria | 15 | 10 | 11
15 | (Colombia) Cristina Amaya | 10 | 15 | 4
3rd Place
4 | (United States) Rhonda Rajsich | 15 | 15
3 | (United States) Cheryl Gudinas | 8 | 14
