= Racquetball at the 2019 Pan American Games – Women's team =

Racquetball – Women's team at the 2019 Pan American Games
- Venue: Racquetball Courts
- Dates: August 7–10, 2019
- Competitors: 22

Medalists
Gold medal	Paola Longoria; Montserrat Mejia; Samantha Salas	Mexico
Silver medal	Natalia Mendez; Maria Jose Vargas	Argentina
Bronze medal	Kelani Lawrence; Rhonda Rajsich	United States
Bronze medal	Angélica Barrios; Valeria Centellas; Jenny Daza	Bolivia

The women's team racquetball competition at the 2019 Pan American Games in Lima, Peru was held between August 7 to 10, 2019 at the Racquetball courts located at the Villa Deportiva Regional del Callao cluster. Mexico won gold in the Women's Team event, and it was their third consecutive Women's Team gold in Racquetball at the Pan American Games.

== Schedule ==
All times are Central Standard Time (UTC-6).

Date	Time	Round
August 7, 2019	17:30	First Round
August 8, 2019	10:00	Quarterfinals
August 9, 2019	10:00	Semifinals
August 10, 2019	11:00	Final

== Results ==
=== Playoffs ===
First Round
Chile	0	0
Ecuador	2	2
Cuba	0	0
Bolivia	2	2
Canada	2	0	2
Dominican Republic	1	2	0

Quarterfinals
Mexico	2	2
Ecuador	0	0
Colombia	0	0
United States	2	2
Guatemala	0	0
Bolivia	2	2
Canada	0	0
Argentina	2	2

Semifinals
Mexico	2	2
United States	0	0
Bolivia	0	1
Argentina	2	2

Final
Mexico	2	2
Argentina	0	0

== Final standings ==
Rank	Nation	Athlete
1st place, gold medalist(s)	Mexico	Paola Longoria; Montserrat Mejia; Samantha Salas
2nd place, silver medalist(s)	Argentina	Natalia Mendez; Maria Jose Vargas
3rd place, bronze medalist(s)	United States	Kelani Lawrence; Rhonda Rajsich
3rd place, bronze medalist(s)	Bolivia	Angélica Barrios; Valeria Centellas; Jenny Daza
5	Ecuador	María Jose Muñoz; María Paz Muñoz
5	Canada	Frédérique Lambert; Jennifer Saunders
5	Colombia	Cristina Amaya; Adriana Riveros
5	Guatemala	Gabriela Martínez; Maria Rodriguez
9	Chile	Carla Muñoz; Josefa Parada
9	Cuba	Loraine Felipe; Maria Regla Viera
9	Dominican Republic	Merynanyelly Delgado; Alejandra Jiménez
