= 2024 Racquetball World Championships – Women's singles =

Women’s singles at the XXII Racquetball World Championships
- Location: San Antonio, Texas, United States
- Dates: August 24–31, 2024

Medalists
| gold medal | (Mexico) Paola Longoria |
| silver medal | (Guatemala) Gabriela Martinez |
| bronze medal | (Argentina) Maria Jose Vargas (Chile) Carla Muñoz |

The International Racquetball Federation's 22nd Racquetball World Championships were held in San Antonio, Texas, United States from August 24–31, 2024. This was the first time that Worlds was held in the USA since 1996, when it was held in Phoenix, Arizona.

The 2024 World Championships used a best-of-five games match format, with each game played to 11 points, win by 2, with rally scoring.

Mexican Paola Longoria won women's singles for a record-extending sixth time by defeating Guatemalan Gabriela Martinez in the final, 12–10, 11–7, 11–7. This was the fourth time in the last five World Championships that Longoria and Martinez met in the women's singles final. Longoria previously won in 2016, 2021, and 2022, and Martinez in 2018.

== Tournament format ==
The 2022 World Championships used a two-stage format to determine the World Champions. Initially, players competed in separate groups over three days. The results were used to seed players for the medal round, with only the top two players from each group advancing to the medal round.

== Women's singles ==
=== Preliminary round ===
Group 1

| Players | Pld | W | L | GW | GL | PW | PL | Place |
|---|---|---|---|---|---|---|---|---|
| (Mexico) Paola Longoria | 2 | 2 | 0 | 6 | 0 | 66 | 25 | 1 |
| (Canada) Christine Keay | 2 | 1 | 1 | 3 | 4 | 56 | 65 | 2 |
| (Chile) Paula Mansilla | 2 | 0 | 2 | 1 | 6 | 44 | 76 | 3 |

Group 2

| Players | Pld | W | L | GW | GL | PW | PL | Place |
|---|---|---|---|---|---|---|---|---|
| (Chile) Carla Muñoz | 3 | 3 | 0 | 8 | 3 | 148 | 129 | 1 |
| (United States) Kelani Lawrence | 3 | 2 | 1 | 8 | 3 | 120 | 84 | 2 |
| (Canada) Danielle Ramsay | 3 | 1 | 2 | 5 | 6 | 109 | 109 | 3 |
| (Costa Rica) Jimena Gómez | 3 | 0 | 3 | 1 | 9 | 54 | 108 | 4 |

Group 3

| Players | Pld | W | L | GW | GL | PW | PL | Place |
|---|---|---|---|---|---|---|---|---|
| (Mexico) Montserrat Mejia | 3 | 3 | 0 | 9 | 0 | 99 | 41 | 1 |
| (Italy) Cristina Amaya | 3 | 2 | 1 | 6 | 4 | 93 | 75 | 2 |
| (Japan) Harumi Kajino | 3 | 1 | 2 | 4 | 8 | 78 | 117 | 3 |
| (Ecuador) Ana Lucía Sarmiento | 3 | 0 | 3 | 2 | 9 | 73 | 110 | 4 |

Group 4

| Players | Pld | W | L | GW | GL | PW | PL | Place |
|---|---|---|---|---|---|---|---|---|
| (Bolivia) Angélica Barrios | 3 | 3 | 0 | 9 | 2 | 118 | 78 | 1 |
| (United States) Michelle Key | 3 | 2 | 1 | 8 | 4 | 123 | 105 | 2 |
| (South Korea) Sumin Lee | 3 | 1 | 2 | 4 | 6 | 86 | 100 | 3 |
| (Costa Rica) Larissa Faeth | 3 | 0 | 3 | 0 | 9 | 60 | 104 | 4 |

Group 5

| Players | Pld | W | L | GW | GL | PW | PL | Place |
|---|---|---|---|---|---|---|---|---|
| (Argentina) Maria Jose Vargas | 3 | 3 | 0 | 9 | 2 | 115 | 82 | 1 |
| (Dominican Republic) Merynanyelly Delgado | 3 | 2 | 1 | 6 | 3 | 89 | 65 | 2 |
| (Ecuador) María José Muñoz | 3 | 1 | 2 | 3 | 6 | 65 | 87 | 3 |
| (Japan) Ayako Hanashi | 3 | 0 | 3 | 2 | 9 | 81 | 116 | 4 |

Group 6

| Players | Pld | W | L | GW | GL | PW | PL | Place |
|---|---|---|---|---|---|---|---|---|
| (Guatemala) Gabriela Martinez | 3 | 3 | 0 | 9 | 0 | 99 | 33 | 1 |
| (Bolivia) Camila Rivero | 3 | 2 | 1 | 6 | 4 | 94 | 72 | 2 |
| (South Korea) Haeok Jeong | 3 | 1 | 2 | 4 | 6 | 63 | 88 | 3 |
| (Chile) Paula Mansilla | 3 | 0 | 3 | 0 | 9 | 36 | 99 | 4 |

Group 7

| Players | Pld | W | L | GW | GL | PW | PL | Place |
|---|---|---|---|---|---|---|---|---|
| (Argentina) Natalia Mendez | 3 | 3 | 0 | 9 | 3 | 122 | 79 | 1 |
| (Dominican Republic) María Céspedes | 3 | 2 | 1 | 8 | 6 | 129 | 128 | 2 |
| (Guatemala) María Renee Rodríguez | 3 | 1 | 2 | 6 | 6 | 113 | 123 | 3 |
| (Republic of Ireland) Aisling Hickey | 3 | 0 | 3 | 1 | 9 | 78 | 112 | 4 |

=== Medal round ===
First round
9 | (Bolivia) Camila Rivero | 7 | 5 | 11 | 13 | 11
8 | (Dominican Republic) María Céspedes | 7 | 5 | 9 | 11 | 0
5 | (Argentina) Maria Jose Vargas | 13 | 11 | 11
12 | (Italy) Cristina Amaya | 11 | 6 | 4
13 | (United States) Kelani Lawrence | 11 | 12 | 3 | 15
4 | (Bolivia) Angélica Barrios | 6 | 10 | 11 | 13
3 | (Mexico) Montserrat Mejia | 11 | 11 | 11
14 | (Canada) Christie Keay | 4 | 8 | 3
11 | (United States) Michelle Key | 5 | 11 | 7 | 2
6 | (Guatemala) Gabriela Martinez | 11 | 9 | 11 | 11
7 | (Argentina) Natalia Mendez | 11 | 11 | 11
10 | (Dominican Republic) Merynanyelly Delgado | 3 | 8 | 5

Quarterfinals
1 | (Mexico) Paola Longoria | 11 | 11 | 11
9 | (Bolivia) Camilla Rivero | 4 | 9 | 9
5 | (Argentina) Maria Jose Vargas | 11 | 12 | 14 | 11 | 11
13 | (United States) Kelani Lawrence | 11 | 14 | 12 | 7 | 8
3 | (Mexico) Montserrat Mejia | 3 | 2 | 21
6 | (Guatemala) Gabriela Martinez | 11 | 11 | 23
7 | (Argentina) Natalia Mendez | 11 | 9 | 11 | 8 | 8
2 | (Chile) Carla Muñoz | 7 | 11 | 6 | 11 | 11

Semifinals
9 | (Mexico) Paola Longoria | 11 | 16 | 9 | 11
5 | (Argentina) Maria Jose Vargas | 9 | 14 | 11 | 5
6 | (Guatemala) Gabriela Martinez | 9 | 11 | 11 | 11
2 | (Chile) Carla Muñoz | 11 | 7 | 5 | 4

Final
1 | (Mexico) Paola Longoria | 11 | 6 | 11 | 12
6 | (Guatemala) Gabriela Martinez | 5 | 11 | 9 | 10
