= Racquetball at the 2011 Pan American Games – Women's doubles =

Racquetball – Women's doubles at the 2011 Pan American Games
- Venue: Racquetball Complex
- Dates: October 17 - October 22
- Competitors: 18 from 9 nations

Medalists
Gold medal	Paola Longoria; Samantha Salas	Mexico
Silver medal	Rhonda Rajsich; Aimee Ruiz	United States
Bronze medal	Angela Grisar; Carla Muñoz	Chile
Bronze medal	María Córdova; María Muñoz	Ecuador

The women's doubles competition of the racquetball events at the 2011 Pan American Games will be held from October 17–22 at the Racquetball Complex in Guadalajara, Mexico. The defending Pan American Games champions are Susana Acosta and Rosa Torres of Mexico, while the defending Pan American regional champion from 2011 is Paola Longoria and Samantha Salas, also of Mexico.

== Schedule ==
All times are Central Standard Time (UTC-6).

Date	Time	Round
October 17, 2011	8:00	Groups
October 18, 2011	8:00	Groups
October 19, 2011	8:00	Groups
October 20, 2011	8:00	Quarterfinals
October 21, 2011	8:00	Semifinals
October 22, 2011	10:00	Final

== Round robin ==
The round robin will be used as a qualification round. Groups will be announced at the technical meeting the day before the competition begins.

=== Pool A ===
Player	Pld	W	L	GF	GA	PF	PA	Points
Paola Longoria / Samantha Salas (MEX)	2	2	0	4	0	60	6	4
Angela Grisar / Carla Muñoz (CHI)	2	1	1	2	3	34	58	2
Claudine García / Yira Portes (DOM)	2	0	2	1	4	29	59	0

=== Pool B ===
Player	Pld	W	L	GF	GA	PF	PA	Points
Rhonda Rajsich / Aimee Ruiz (USA)	2	2	0	4	0	60	23	4
María Córdova / María Muñoz (ECU)	2	1	1	2	2	39	48	2
Ishley Paredes / Mariana Tobon (VEN)	2	0	2	0	4	32	60	0

=== Pool C ===
Player	Pld	W	L	GF	GA	PF	PA	Points
Cintia Loma / Jenny Daza (BOL)	2	2	0	4	0	60	21	4
Veronique Guillemette / Dafne Macrino (ARG)	2	1	1	2	2	43	50	2
Josée Grand'Maître / Brandi Jacobson (CAN)	2	0	2	0	4	28	60	0

== Playoffs ==
First Round
8	Josée Grand'Maître (Canada) Brandi Jacobson (CAN)	15	15
9	Ishley Paredes (Venezuela) Mariana Tobon (VEN)	6	13

Quarterfinals
1	Paola Longoria (Mexico) Samantha Salas (MEX)	15	15
Josée Grand'Maître (Canada) Brandi Jacobson (CAN)	1	2
5	Angela Grisar (Chile) Carla Muñoz (CHI)	15	15
4	Veronique Guillemette (Argentina) Dafne Macrino (ARG)	12	6
3	Cintia Loma (Bolivia) Jenny Daza (BOL)	10	15	7
6	María Córdova (Ecuador) María Muñoz (ECU)	15	2	11
7	Claudine García (Dominican Republic) Yira Portes (DOM)	2	6
2	Rhonda Rajsich (United States) Aimee Ruiz (USA)	15	15

Semifinals
1	Paola Longoria (Mexico) Samantha Salas (MEX)	15	15
5	Angela Grisar (Chile) Carla Muñoz (CHI)	5	5
6	María Córdova (Ecuador) María Muñoz (ECU)	8	5
2	Rhonda Rajsich (United States) Aimee Ruiz (USA)	15	15

Final
1	Paola Longoria (Mexico) Samantha Salas (MEX)	15	5	11
2	Rhonda Rajsich (United States) Aimee Ruiz (USA)	12	15	5
