= Racquetball at the 2011 Pan American Games – Women's singles =

Racquetball – Women's singles at the 2011 Pan American Games
- Venue: Racquetball Complex
- Dates: October 17 - October 25

Medalists
Gold medal	Paola Longoria	Mexico
Silver medal	Rhonda Rajsich	United States
Bronze medal	Cheryl Gudinas	United States
Bronze medal	María Jose Vargas	Bolivia

The women's singles competition of the racquetball events at the 2011 Pan American Games will be held from October 17–22 at the Racquetball Complex in Guadalajara, Mexico. The defending Pan American Games champion is Cheryl Gudinas of the United States, while the defending Pan American regional champion from 2011 is Rhonda Rajsich also of the United States.

== Schedule ==
All times are Central Standard Time (UTC-6).

Date	Time	Round
October 17, 2011	8:00	Groups
October 18, 2011	8:00	Groups
October 19, 2011	8:00	Round of 16
October 20, 2011	8:00	Quarterfinals
October 21, 2011	8:00	Semifinals
October 22, 2011	10:00	Final

== Round robin ==
The round robin will be used as a qualification round. Groups will be announced at the technical meeting the day before the competition begins.

=== Pool A ===
Player	Pld	W	L	GF	GA	PF	PA	Points
Paola M. Longoria (MEX)	2	2	0	4	0	60	13	4
María P. Muñoz (ECU)	2	1	1	2	2	39	36	3
Carla P. Muñoz (CHI)	2	0	2	0	4	10	60	2

=== Pool B ===
Player	Pld	W	L	GF	GA	PF	PA	Points
Rhonda Rajsich (USA)	2	2	0	4	0	60	9	4
María C. Córdova (ECU)	2	1	1	2	3	31	52	3
Angela Grisar (CHI)	2	0	2	1	4	22	52	1

=== Pool C ===
Player	Pld	W	L	GF	GA	PF	PA	Points
Frederique Lambert (CAN)	3	3	0	6	1	95	57	6
Samantha Salas (MEX)	3	2	1	5	2	92	56	5
Cristina Amaya (COL)	3	1	2	2	5	69	86	4
Mariana Tobon (VEN)	3	0	3	1	6	38	95	3

=== Pool D ===
Player	Pld	W	L	GF	GA	PF	PA	Points
Cheryl L. Gudinas (USA)	3	3	0	6	1	100	47	6
Claudine García (DOM)	3	2	1	5	2	88	72	5
María Jose Vargas (BOL)	3	1	2	2	4	68	71	4
Marie A. Gomar (GUA)	3	0	3	0	6	24	90	3

=== Pool E ===
Player	Pld	W	L	GF	GA	PF	PA	Points
Jennifer N. Saunders (CAN)	3	3	0	6	0	90	38	6
Jenny R. Daza (BOL)	3	2	1	4	2	75	77	5
Veronique Guillemette (ARG)	3	1	2	2	4	64	79	4
Islhey Paredes (VEN)	3	0	2	0	6	55	90	3

== Playoffs ==
=== Finals ===
Semifinals				Final
1	Paola Longoria (MEX)	15	15
4	Cheryl Gudinas (USA)	7	10	1	Paola Longoria (MEX)	12	15	11
14	María Jose Vargas (BOL)	6	7	2	Rhonda Rajsich (USA)	15	10	9
2	Rhonda Rajsich (USA)	15	15

=== Top half ===
First Round
17	Marie Gomar (GUA)	15	7	5
16	Ishley Paredes (VEN)	14	15	11

Second Round
1	Paola Longoria (MEX)	15	15
16	Ishley Paredes (VEN)	4	4
9	María Córdova (ECU)	10	1
8	Samantha Salas (MEX)	15	15
5	Jennifer Saunders (CAN)	11	7
12	Angela Grisar (CHI)	15	15
13	Cristina Amaya (COL)	12	6
4	Cheryl Gudinas (USA)	15	15

Quarterfinals
1	Paola Longoria (MEX)	15	15
8	Samantha Salas (MEX)	7	5
12	Angela Grisar (CHI)	15	4	1
4	Cheryl Gudinas (USA)	13	15	11

Semifinals
1	Paola Longoria (MEX)	15	15
4	Cheryl Gudinas (USA)	7	10

=== Bottom half ===
First Round
18	Guillemette Veronique (ARG)
15	Mariana Tobon (VEN)	w/o

Second Round
3	Frederique Lambert (CAN)	11	8
14	María Jose Vargas (BOL)	15	15
11	Carla Muñoz (CHI)	1	1
6	Jenny Daza (BOL)	15	15
10	Claudine García (DOM)	4	10
7	María Muñoz (ECU)	15	15
15	Mariana Tobon (VEN)	6	5
2	Rhonda Rajsich (USA)	15	15

Quarterfinals
14	María Jose Vargas (BOL)	15	15
6	Jenny Daza (BOL)	6	13
7	María Muñoz (ECU)	13	6
2	Rhonda Rajsich (USA)	15	15

Semifinals
14	María Jose Vargas (BOL)	6	7
2	Rhonda Rajsich (USA)	15	15
