= Racquetball at the 2009 World Games – women's singles =

2009 World Games - Racquetball Single Women
Host	(Taiwan) Kaohsiung
Dates	July 21–23, 2009
Teams	15
Podium
Champions	(Mexico) Paola Longoria
Runner-up	(United States) Rhonda Rajsich
Third place	(Chile) Angela Grisar
Fourth place	(United States) Cheryl Gudinas

The racquetball - women's singles competition at the World Games 2009 took place from July 21 to 23 at the Chung Cheng Martial Arts Stadium in Kaohsiung, Taiwan. Players qualified for this event from their performances at the 2008 Racquetball World Championships.

== Last 16 ==
Rhonda Rajsich (United States)	BYE
Yazmine Sabja (Bolivia)	2–0	(Mexico) Susana Acosta
Angela Grisar (Chile)	2–1	(Bolivia) Jenny Daza
Cristina Cordova (Ecuador)	0–2	(Canada) Jennifer Saunders
Paola Longoria (Mexico)	2–0	(South Korea) Jung Eun Ane
Josée Grand'Maître (Canada)	2–0	(Ecuador) Maria Paz Munoz
Harumi Kajino (Japan)	0–2	(Japan) Toshiko Sakamoto
Cristina Amaya (Colombia)	0–2	(United States) Cheryl Gudinas

== Last 8 ==
Quarter-finals
(United States) Rhonda Rajsich	2
(Bolivia) Yazmine Sabja	0
(Chile) Angela Grisar	2
(Canada) Jennifer Saunders	0
(Mexico) Paola Longoria	2
(Canada) Josée Grand'Maître	0
(Japan) Toshiko Sakamoto	0
(United States) Cheryl Gudinas	2

Semi-finals
(United States) Rhonda Rajsich	2
(Chile) Angela Grisar	1
(United States) Cheryl Gudinas	1
(Mexico) Paola Longoria	2

Final
(United States) Rhonda Rajsich	1
(Mexico) Paola Longoria	2
Third place
(Chile) Angela Grisar	w/o
(United States) Cheryl Gudinas	w/d
