= Rhonda Rajsich =

American racquetball player

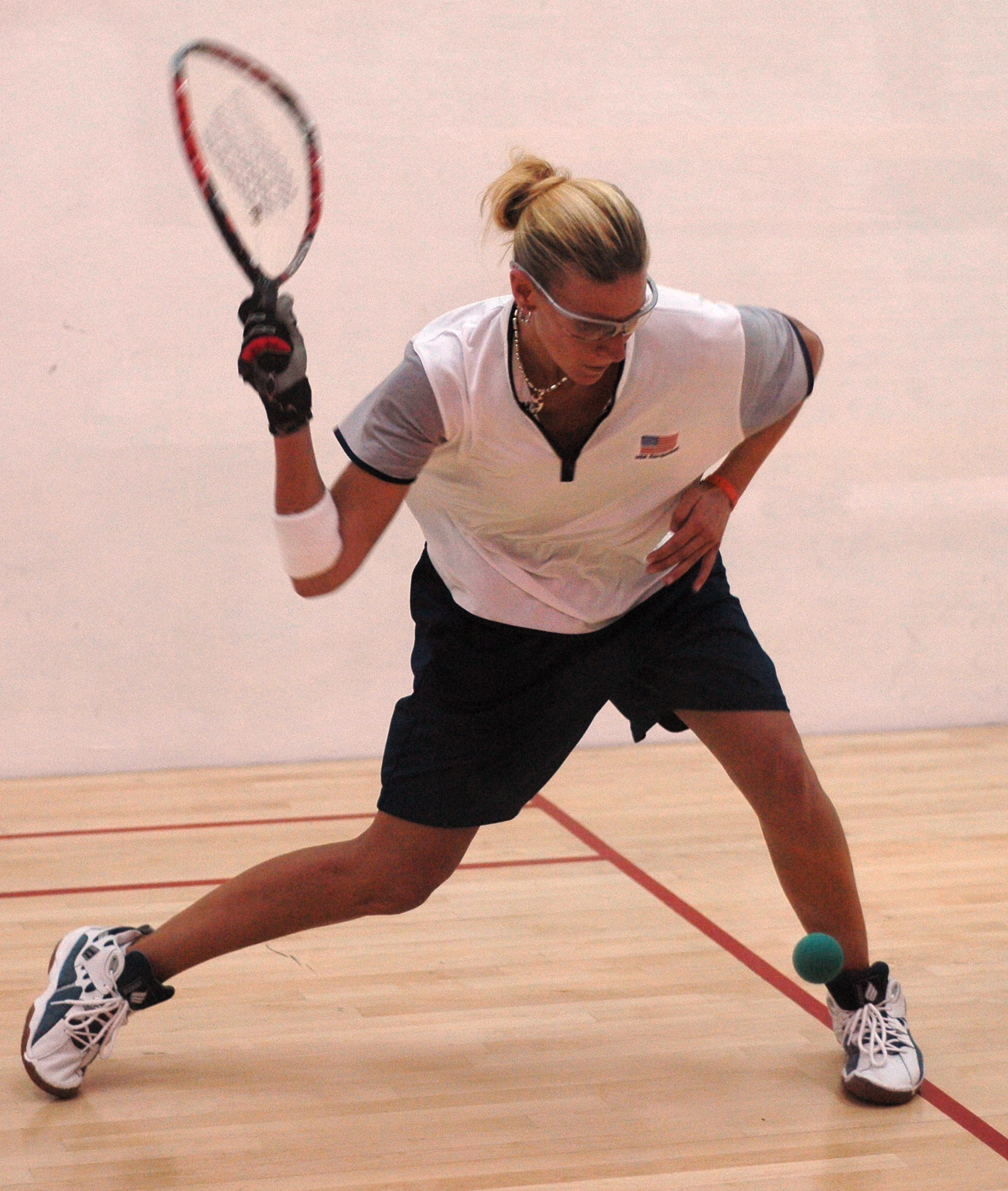
- Rajsich at 2006 World Championships

Personal information
- Nicknames: Rhonda Rocks, Rondeezee
- Born: October 7, 1978 (age 47) Phoenix, Arizona, U.S.
- Height: 5 ft 10 in (178 cm)

Sport
- Country: USA
- Sport: Racquetball
- College team: Stephen F. Austin
- Team: Ektelon, rollout
- Coached by: Jim Winterton

Achievements and titles
- National finals: 1st singles (2004, 2006, 2007), 1st doubles (2012 & 2015)
- Highest world ranking: No. 1 (2005-08, 2010-11)
Medal record
World Championships
Silver medal – second place	2021 Guatemala City	Doubles
Bronze medal – third place	2021 Guatemala City	Singles
Silver medal – second place	2014 Canada	Singles
Bronze medal – third place	2012 Dominican Republic	Singles
Bronze medal – third place	2012 Dominican Republic	Doubles
Silver medal – second place	2012 Dominican Republic	Team
Gold medal – first place	2010 South Korea	Singles
Gold medal – first place	2010 South Korea	Team
Gold medal – first place	2008 Ireland	Singles
Gold medal – first place	2006 Dominican Republic	Team
Pan American Games
Bronze medal – third place	2019 Lima	Doubles
Bronze medal – third place	2019 Lima	Team
Bronze medal – third place	2015 Toronto	Singles
Bronze medal – third place	2015 Toronto	Doubles
Silver medal – second place	2015 Toronto	Team
Silver medal – second place	2011 Guadalajara	Singles
Silver medal – second place	2011 Guadalajara	Doubles
Silver medal – second place	2011 Guadalajara	Team
Pan American Championships
Bronze medal – third place	2022 Santa Cruz	Doubles
Bronze medal – third place	2022 Santa Cruz	Team
Gold medal – first place	2018 Temuco	Singles
Gold medal – first place	2017 San Jose	Singles
Bronze medal – third place	2017 San Jose	Doubles
Gold medal – first place	2013 Cali	Doubles
Silver medal – second place	2013 Cali	Singles
Bronze medal – third place	2012 Temuco	Singles
Gold medal – first place	2011 Managua	Singles
Silver medal – second place	2008 San Jose	Singles
Gold medal – first place	2007 Santiago	Singles
Gold medal – first place	2007 Santiago	Doubles
Bronze medal – third place	2002 Cochabamba	Singles
World Games
Bronze medal – third place	2013 Cali	Singles
Silver medal – second place	2009 Kaohsiung	Singles

Rhonda Rajsich (born October 7, 1978) is an American racquetball player. She has been World Champion in Women's Singles twice, and Pan American Champion 6 times (4 times in Women's Singles & twice in Women's Doubles), as well as US Open champion four times. Rajsich was the #1 player on the Ladies Professional Racquetball Tour season ending rankings four times – three straight seasons from 2005–06 to 2007-08 and then again in 2010–11. She is of Serbian descent.

== Junior career ==
Rajsich played racquetball several years as a junior with some success, although most of it came in doubles. She won Girls U12 Doubles at the 1991 World Junior Championships with Vanessa Tulao. Rajsich and Tulao won Girls U14 Doubles at the USA Racquetball Junior Olympics in 1992 and 1993. In 1994, they won Girls U16 at both the World Junior Championships and the USA Racquetball Junior Olympics.

In 1995, Rajsich began a streak of three consecutive Girls U18 Doubles at the USA Racquetball Junior Olympics. She won the first and third with Tulao (1995 and 1997) and the second with Dawn Gates (1996). Rajsich took the double at the 1996 World Junior Championships, as she won both Girls U18 Singles and Doubles with Sadie Gross. Rajsich's last junior title came in Girls U18 Singles at the 1997 USA Racquetball Junior Olympic Championships.

== Collegiate career ==
Rajsich played basketball rather than racquetball in college. She first played at Phoenix College in the Arizona Community College Athletic Conference, where she was freshman of the year in 1997-98, and was a first-team all-conference player in both 1997-98 and 1998–99.

She then transferred to Stephen F. Austin University and played for the Ladyjacks in 1999-2000 on a team that went 28-4 and won the Southland Conference Championship.

== 2000-01 to 2004-05 - Career begins ==
Rajsich began playing the women's pro tour in the 2000–01 season. Immediately, she made an impact, as she reached the final of the 2000 US Open, in her first time playing that event and only her 3rd event of the season. Also, Rajsich won the last event of the season: Tournament of Champions in Portland, defeating Laura Fenton in the final. The win helped her finish the season ranked 3rd, starting a streak of being ranked within the top 6 that would continue for 19 consecutive seasons.

In 2001–02, Rajsich again won an event - in Rosarito Beach, where she defeated Kerri Wachtel — and was a finalist in Lakewood, Colorado, losing to Jackie Paraiso. In 2002, Rajsich made her first appearance with Team USA by competing in Women's Singles at the 2002 Pan American Championships (then Tournament of the Americas), where she was bronze medalist after losing in the semi-finals to Canadian Josée Grand'Maître.

Rajsich didn't win a pro title in the 2002–03 season, but she didn't lose in the Round of 16 either, as she had five times over the previous two seasons. She did reach one final that season: in Albuquerque, where she lost to Paraiso. Overall, Rajsich was ranked 4th at season's end.

Rajsich won only one title in the 2003–04, but it was the big one: the 2003 US Open. It was her second US Open final, and she played Christie Van Hees, as she did back in 2000, but this time Rajsich won, 6-11, 11–7, 11–4, 11–7. Rajsich was a finalist in one other event that season, which was in Tempe, Arizona, where Van Hees got the better of her. She finished the season ranked 3rd, which was a career-best.

Rajsich won Women's Singles at the US National Championships for the first time in 2004, which led to her playing Women's Singles at the 2004 World Championships in Anyang, South Korea, where she lost to Chilean Angela Grisar in the quarterfinals, 15–14, 15–10.

Rajsich reached three finals in the 2004–05 season, which was one better than she'd done previously in her career, and that began a streak of at least three finals a season that she maintained until the 2016–17 season. Rajsich went 1–2 in those three finals, winning in Miami, where she defeated Grisar in the final, but coming runner up in Nashville to Van Hees and at the 2004 US Open to Cheryl Gudinas, 11–8, 11–5, 8-11, 12–14, 11–3. She finished the season ranked 3rd, as she had the season before.

== 2005-06 to 2010-11 - Prime years ==
Rajsich began a period of seasons with multiple pro tour wins in the 2005–06 season. She again beat Grisar to win the Miami Open, and also won in New Orleans by defeating Paola Longoria in what was their first meeting in a final. Rajsich was also runner-up in two events that season, including the 2005 US Open, where Van Hees got the better of her. All together her results led to Rajsich becoming the #1 player on the women's tour for the first time.

At the 2006 USA National Doubles Championships, Rajsich and Janel Tisinger were runners-up to Laura Fenton and Aimee Ruiz. But Rajisch won her second USA Racquetball Women's Singles championship in 2006, which qualified her for Team USA at the 2006 World Championships in Santo Domingo, Dominican Republic. Rajsich played Women's Singles at Worlds, and as in 2004, she lost to Angela Grisar in the quarterfinals. But Rajsich helped the USA win gold in the Women's Team event.

Rajsich followed up the 2005–06 season with her best two seasons on tour. In both 2006-07 and 2007–08, she won five times on tour, which was half the tour events, so Rajsich maintained the #1 ranking over those two seasons. In 2006–07, Rajsich won three events in a row - Fayetteville, North Carolina, Denver and Gaithersburg, Maryland - coming into the 2006 US Open, but then lost in the quarterfinals to Van Hees, 12–10, 7-11, 11–3, 11–6. But she rebounded to win in Stockton and New Orleans before the season was out.

For the 2007 US National Doubles Championships, Rajsich again played with Janel Tisinger, and they finished 3rd after losing to Kristen Bellows and Kim Russell-Waselenchuk in the semi-finals. Nonetheless, Rajsich and Tisinger were picked to represent the US at the 2007 Pan American Championships in Santiago, Chile, where Rajsich won her first gold medals in international competition.

She defeated Mexican Samantha Salas, 15-7, 10-15, 11-3, for gold in the Women's Singles final, and, with Tisinger, beat Bolivians Jenny Daza and Carola Loma, 15-5, 15-8, for gold in the Women's Doubles final.

Rajsich won her third US National Championship in Women's Singles in 2007, defeating Cheryl Gudinas in the final and Kerri Wachtel in the semi-finals.

In the 2007–08 season, Rajsich captured her 2nd US Open title, defeating Cheryl Gudinas in the 2007 final, 11–6, 11–6, 8-11, 11–9, which was one of the five titles she won that season. Rajsich closed out the season with four straight wins: in Tempe, York, Pennsylvania, Miami, and New Orleans. She ended the season #1 for the third straight year.

At the 2008 US Championships, Rajsich was runner-up at National Doubles, where she played with Janel Tisinger, and they lost the final to Jackie Paraiso and Aimee Ruiz. At US National Singles that year, Rajsich came in seeded #1 due to her win the previous year, but she was upset in the semi-finals by Kristen Bellows.

Rajsich won her first Women's Singles World Championships at the 2008 World Championships in Kingscourt, Ireland, defeating fellow American Cheryl Gudinas in the final.

In 2008-09 pro season, Rajsich won four times: Fayetteville, North Carolina, Tijuana, Arlington, Virginia and York, Pennsylvania, But her most remarkable result that season came at the 2008 US Open, where she was upset by 8th seed Brenda Kyzer in the quarterfinals, which was a surprise result given Rajsich was defending champion and had won two of the three pro events before the US Open. The upset opened the door for Paola Longoria to win her first US Open, as Longoria defeated Kyzer in the semi-finals en route to the win. That loss combined with Longoria's good performances that season led to Rajsich finishing 2nd in the rankings to Longoria.

Rajsich again played doubles with Janel Tisinger at the 2009 USA Racquetball National Doubles Championships, and were beaten in the final by Jackie Paraiso and Aimee Ruiz, 15–11, 15–13. At USA Racquetball National Singles, Rajsich lost in the semi-finals to Ruiz, 15–14, 10–15, 11–2, who went on to win that year.

Rajsich played two international events in 2009 representing the US in Women's Singles both times. She lost in the Round of 16 to Longoria at the 2009 Pan American Championships. Then at the 2009 World Games in Taiwan, Rajsich reached the final, but again lost to Longoria.

Rajsich won just twice in the 2009-10 pro season, which was her lowest total since 2005–06. Those events were the first two of the season: the Texas Open in Dallas, and the 2009 US Open. She won her 3rd US Open by defeating Longoria in the final, 1-11, 11–8, 11–3, 2-11, 11–7. But overall that season Longoria defeated Rajsich four of five times, so at season's end Rajich was again 2nd to Longoria in the rankings.

Rajsich and Tisinger played together for the fifth consecutive year at the USA Racquetball National Doubles Championships, and once again they were runners up to Jackie Paraiso and Aimee Ruiz, 15–8, 15–7. At the 2010 USA Racquetball National Singles Championships, Rajich lost to Cheryl Gudinas in the semi-finals, and then played Tisinger for 3rd with Rajsich winning 15–10, 15–14.

But in the summer of 2010, Rajsich won the second of her back-to-back World Championships in Women's Singles, and she did so by defeating Paola Longoria in the semi-finals, 9-15, 15–10, 11–5. Rajsich went on to beat Longoria's Mexican teammate Nancy Enriquez in the final, 15–8, 15–11, in Seoul, South Korea. She and her teammates also won the Women's Team competition.

Rajsich bounced back in the 2010-11 pro season by winning four events: in Cali, Colombia, Arlington, Virginia, Stockton, California, as well as winning her US Open, where she beat Longoria in the final, 11–8, 8-11, 11–9, 11–5, which was her second consecutive US Open and third in four years. Her good results led to Rajsich regaining the #1 ranking at season's end, which was the fourth time she'd finished #1.

At the 2011 USA National Doubles Championships, Rajsich played with Kim Russell-Waselenchuk for the first time. They lost in the semi-finals to Krystal Csuk and Cheryl Gudinas, 15–6, 2-15, 11–9, and then lost the 3rd place match to sisters Danielle and Michelle Key, 3-15, 15–10, 11–10. However, Rajsich won Women's Singles at the 2011 USA National Singles Championships by beating Gudinas in the final, 15–2, 15–2.

Rajsich was on Team USA twice in 2011. She won gold in Women's Singles at the 2011 Pan American Championships. Then Rajsich played in her first Pan American Games reaching the final in Women's Singles in Guadalajara, Mexico, where she played Mexican Paola Longoria, losing 12–15, 15–10, 11–9. That scenario repeated itself in the Women's Team final, as Longoria again defeated Rajsich, and Mexico took the gold and the USA silver.

== 2011-12 to 2015-16 ==
Rajsich won only once during the 2011-12 pro season, as Paola Longoria's dominance began. Rajsich's win came in the first event of the season in Dallas, where she defeated Samantha Salas in the final, as Longoria wasn't in Dallas. Rajsich met Longoria in the final seven times that season, losing all seven, including the 2011 US Open. As a result, Rajsich finished 2nd to Longoria in the season-ending rankings.

Rajsich won her first Women's Doubles title at the US National Doubles Championships in 2012 with Kim Russell-Waselenchuk. They knocked off the defending champions Paraiso and Ruiz in the semi-finals, 13–15, 15–6, 11–7, and then beat Krystal Csuk and Cheryl Gudinas in the final, 15–11, 15–5. She followed up the doubles title by winning Women's Singles at the 2012 USA National Singles Championships, again defeating Gudinas in the final. These two wins led to her playing both singles and doubles at Worlds.

At the 2012 World Championships in Santo Domingo, Dominican Republic, Rajsich lost to Longoria in the Women's Singles semi-finals, 15–2, 15–12, so finished with a bronze medal. She played Women's Doubles with Aimee Ruiz, and they lost to Angela Grisar and Carla Muñoz in the semi-finals, 15–14, 2-15, 11–10. In the Women's Team event, the USA finished 2nd to Mexico, so Rajsich came home from Worlds with three medals: two bronze in the individual competitions and a silver medal in the team competition.

In the 2012–13 season, for just the second first time in her career and first since 2002–03, Rajsich did not win a pro event. She was in eight finals, but lost them all to Longoria. Nonetheless, she was able to finish 2nd in the rankings.

Rajsich and Russell-Waselenchuk were defending champions going into the 2013 USA Racquetball National Doubles Championships, but they were upset by Danielle Key and Michelle Key in the semi-finals, 9-15, 15–5, 11–8, and then lost the 3rd place match to Kelani Bailey and Cheryl Gudinas, 15–12, 15–7. But Rajsich won Women's Singles at the 2013 USA Racquetball National Singles Championships, defeating her former doubles partner Janel Tisinger in the final, 15–12, 15–7.

Rajsich won two medals for Team USA at the 2013 Pan American Championships. She and Sharon Jackson won gold in Women's Doubles, as they defeated Longoria and Samantha Salas in the final, 15–5, 15–7, and Rajsich was a finalist in Women's Singles, losing to Longoria, 15–5, 15–6.

She also medaled for the US at the 2013 World Games, where Rajsich reached the semi-finals in Women's Singles at the 2013 World Games in Cali, Colombia, where she lost to Longoria, 15–8, 15–14. Rajsich won bronze in Cali by defeating teammate Cheryl Gudinas, 15–8, 15–14.

The 2013–14 season played out similar to the 2012–13 season, as Rajsich reached six finals but didn't win one. Also, Rajsich lost in the Round of 16 for the first time since 2003–04, as Frédérique Lambert defeated her in Toluca, Mexico. Nevertheless, her final appearances helped Rajsich finish 2nd in the rankings.

In 2014, Rajsich played doubles with Kim Russell-Waselenchuk at the 2014 USA Racquetball National Doubles Championships, and they lost in the final to Aimee Ruiz and Janel Tisinger, 15–9, 15–10. Rajsich won Women's Singles at the 2014 USA National Singles Championships, beating Tisinger in the final, 15–10, 15–4.

Rajsich again played Women's Singles for the US at the 2014 World Championships in Burlington, Ontario, and reached the final for the third time in her career. In that final, she faced a familiar foe in Mexican Paola Longoria, losing 6–15, 8–15.

In the 2014-15 pro season, Rajsich returned to the winner's circle, as she defeated Longoria in Stockton, California, 11–9, 5-11, 14–12, 5-11, 11–4, in October 2014. It was Longoria's first loss since May 2011, when - coincidentally - Rajsich also beat her in Stockton. Rajsich was in four other finals that season, but she slipped to 3rd in the season-ending rankings behind Longoria and Maria Jose Vargas.

Rajsich put USA on her back for the 2015 Pan American Championships in Santo Domingo, Dominican Republic. But she didn't medal, losing in the quarterfinals of Women's Singles to Veronica Sotomayor, 15–2, 11–15, 11–2, and in the quarterfinals of Women's Doubles with Sheryl Lotts, as lost to the Argentine team of Maria Jose Vargas and Véronique Guillemette, 15–7, 9-15, 11–5.

She won her second Women's Doubles title at the USA Racquetball National Doubles Championships in 2015 with Kim Russell-Waselenchuk, as they defeated the defending champions Aimee Ruiz and Janel Tisinger in the final, 1-15, 15–10, 11–9. This qualified the pair to play doubles for Team USA at the 2015 Pan American Games in Toronto. Rajsich also won Women's Singles at the 2015 USA Racquetball National Singles Championships, beating Cheryl Gudinas in the final, 15–7, 15–5.

The 2015 Pan American Games were Rajsich's second Pan Am Games. Rajsich earned three medals in Toronto. She was a bronze medalist in both Women's Singles, where she lost to Longoria in the semi-finals, 15–13, 15–9, and Women's Doubles with Kim Russell-Waselenchuk, where they lost to Vargas and Guillemette (Argentina), 15–7, 13–15, 11–6, in the semi-finals, and a silver medalist in the Women's Team event, as the USA was a runner up to Mexico in the final.

Rajsich was in five finals in the 2015-16 pro season, but failed to win any of them, which were all against Paola Longoria. But overall her results were enough to lift Rajsich back to #2 in the season-ending rankings.

Rajsich partnered with Sheryl Lotts for the 2016 USA Racquetball National Doubles Championships, and they came second by the narrowest of margins, losing to Aimee Ruiz and Janel Tisinger, 15–12, 12–15, 11–10, in the final. At the 2016 USA National Singles Championships, Rajsich again won the title. She did it this time by defeating Michelle Key in the final. The win was Rajsich's sixth in a row and ninth overall.

At the 2016 World Championships, Rajsich played Women's Singles, but she was upset in the Round of 16 by Guatemalan teenager Gabriela Martinez, 15–14, 14–15, 11–7.

== 2016-17 to present ==
After the surprising loss at the 2016 Worlds, Rajsich began the 2016-17 pro season with five consecutive quarterfinal losses. She hadn't lost in the quarters five times in an entire season since 2001-02 let alone five quarters in a row.

In late 2016, Rajsich's father, Dennis, died. He was often seen at events, especially the US Open. Her grieving led Rajsich to miss three pro events, which were the first events she had missed since beginning to play the tour in 2000.

Rajsich returned to competition at the 2017 USA Racquetball National Doubles Championships, where she partnered with Sheryl Lotts for the second year. They lost to Da’monique Davis and Jackie Paraiso in the semi-finals, 15–13, 15–10, and then also lost the third-place match to Kelani Bailey and Sharon Jackson, 15–12, 15–5. Rajsich also played singles at National Doubles, as USA Racquetball has included a US Team Qualifying singles division in the tournament. Despite playing her first tournament in months, Rajsich managed to win the event, although she needed tie-breakers to win all three of her matches, including the final against Jackson, which she won 12–15, 15–2, 11–2.

Rajsich rejoined the pro tour in March 2017, reaching the semi-finals of the New Jersey Open, where she lost to Paola Longoria, 11–1, 11–6, 11–8.

Just two tournaments back after the death of her father, Rajsich was asked to play for the US at the 2017 Pan American Championships in San Jose, Costa Rica. With little to expect, Rajsich came through in flying colors, winning two medals, including gold in Women's Singles by defeating her long-time rival Mexican Paola Longoria in the final, 7-15, 15–13, 11–9. In Women's Doubles, Rajsich and Sheryl Lotts earned bronze medals, losing to Longoria and Samantha Salas in the semi-finals, 15–8, 15–4.

Rejuvenated, Rajsich finished the 2016–17 season with semi-final, quarterfinal and final finishes over the last three events. In the final of the season-ending event in Chihuahua, Mexico, she lost to Salas, 11–3, 11–2, 11–6. Despite missing three events, Rajsich finished 6th in the season-ending standings.

For the 7th straight year - and 10th overall - Rajsich won Women's Singles at the 2017 USA Racquetball National Singles Championships, and beat Jackie Paraiso in the final, 15–7, 15–9.

Rajsich didn't reach a final in the 2017-18 LPRT season, but she was in five semi-finals, and finished ranked 5th that season.

Rajsich and Sheryl Lotts played together for the 3rd time at the 2018 USA Racquetball National Doubles Championships, and upset the defending champions Aimee Ruiz and Janel Tisinger in the semi-finals, 15–8, 8-15, 11–8, but lost the final to Kelani Bailey and Sharon Jackson, 15–10, 11–15, 11–8.

Internationally, Rajsich successfully defended her gold medal in Women's Singles at the 2018 Pan American Championships in Temuco, Chile, where she defeated Paola Longoria in the final, 15–3, 14–15, 11–7. Rajsich also played doubles in Temuco with Janel Tisinger, and they lost in the quarterfinals to Chileans Carla Muñoz and Josefa Parada, 15–14, 15–2.

Rajsich won Women's Singles at the 2018 USA Racquetball National Singles Championships by defeating Kelani Bailey, 15–9, 15–7, in the final. That win helped Rajsich secure a spot on the US Team for the 2018 Racquetball World Championships in San José, Costa Rica, where she competed in both Women's Singles and Women's Doubles with Sheryl Lotts. Rajsich lost to Natalia Mendez in the quarterfinals, and she and Lotts lost to Bolivians Valeria Centellas and Yazmine Sabja - the eventual gold medalists - in the quarters of doubles, so for the second successive Worlds Rajsich didn't make a podium.

At the 2019 USA Racquetball National Doubles Championships in Tempe, Arizona, Rajsich and Lotts played together for a 4th time, and lost in the semi-finals to Aimee Ruiz and Janel Tisinger-Ledkins in a tie-breaker, 6-15, 15–13, 11–2. However, Rajsich won the Women's Singles division, defeating Kelani Bailiey Lawrence in the final, 15–7, 15–11.

Rajsich went to the 2019 Pan American Racquetball Championships as the two-time defending champion in Women's Singles, but after defeating Chilean Carla Muñoz in the Round of 16, 15–10, 15–14, she lost to Maria Jose Vargas of Argentina, 15–4, 15–8, in the quarterfinals, so failed to reach the podium.

Rajsich played all 10 of the tournaments on the LPRT in 2018–19, reaching the semi-finals five times but not advancing to a final. Nonetheless, she was ranked 5th at the season's end.

Rajsich was part of Team USA at the 2019 Pan American Games in Lima, Peru, where she played Women's Singles, Women's Doubles and the Women's Team event with Kelani Lawrence. The pair were bronze medalists in both Women's Doubles and the Women's Team events. In doubles, Rajsich and Lawrence defeated Bolivians Jenny Daza and Angelica Barrios, 15–4, 15–9, in the quarterfinals, but lost to eventual gold medalists Paola Longoria and Samantha Salas, 15–6, 15–1, in the semi-finals. In the team event, Rajsich and Lawrence beat Colombia in the quarters, but lost to Mexico in the semi-finals. Finally, in Women's Singles, Rajsich lost in the quarterfinals to Colombia's Adriana Riveros, 15–10, 15–10.

In 2019, for the first time since 2001, Rajsich lost in the Round of 16 at the US Open Championships, as Monserrat Mejia defeated her, 15–6, 15–8.

At the 2021 USAR National Championships, Rajsich won both Women's Singles and Women's Doubles, playing with Erika Manilla. She defeated Kelani Lawrence in the singles final, 15-7, 15-14, and in the doubles final beat Michelle De La Rosa and Sheryl Lotts, 15-8, 15-14.

Rajsich won medals in both Women's Singles and Women's Doubles at the 2021 International Racquetball Federation (IRF) World Championships in Guatemala City. In singles, she upset 2nd seed Maria Jose Vargas of Argentina in the Round of 16, 5-15, 15-5, 11-10, and lost to team-mate Kelani Lawrence, 15-12, 15-7, in the semi-finals. In doubles, she and Erika Manilla reached the final by defeating Argentines Valeria Centellas and Natalia Mendez, 6-15, 15-9, 11-8, in the semi-finals, but lost in the final to Mexicans Paola Longoria and Samantha Salas, 15-14, 15-6. So, Rajsich was a bronze medalist in singles and silver medalist in doubles.

Her singles performance at the 2021 World Championships qualified Rajisch for the 2022 World Games in Birmingham, Alabama.

At the 2022 Pan American Championships, Rajsich was a double bronze medalist. She and Erika Manilla earned bronze in Women's Doubles, beating Colombians Cristina Amaya and Maria Paz Riquelme, 15-9, 15-5, 15-11, in the quarterfinals, but losing to Argentina's Natalia Mendez and Maria Jose Vargas, 15-11, 12-15, 15-14, 15-14, in the semi-finals. Rajsich also helped USA to bronze in the Women's Team event. She also played Women's Singles, losing in the quarterfinals to Chilean Carla Muñoz, 15-13, 10-15, 15-11, 15-13.

Rajsich competed at the 2022 USA Racquetball National Championships in College Station, Texas, where she was runner up in Women's Singles, beating Kelani Lawrence in the semi-finals, 12-10, 6-11, 11-9, 7-11, 11-9, but losing to Erika Manilla in the final, 11-7, 11-8, 11-1. She also competed in Women's Doubles with Sheryl Lotts, losing in the semi-finals to Manilla and Aimee Roehler, 11-8, 11-7, 13-11, and Mixed Doubles with Jose Diaz, losing in the quarterfinals to Manilla and Adam Manilla, 11-8, 12-10, 11-3. Her results were sufficient for Rajsich to be named to Team USA for the 2022-23 season.

At the 2023 USA Racquetball National Doubles & Singles Championships in Tempe, Arizona, Rajsich and Sheryl Lotts finished 3rd. They lost in the semi-finals to Michelle De La Rosa and Erika Manilla, 11-8, 11-5, 11-6, and then won the 3rd place match against Aimee Roehler and Janel Tisinger-Ledkins, 11-6, 10-11, 11-8, 8-11, 11-3. Later that year, Rajsich competed in the USA Racquetball National Team Singles event in Lombard, Illinois, where she defeated Lexi York in the quarterfinals, 11-7, 11-6, 5-11, 9-11, 11-9, but lost to Kelani Lawrence in the semi-finals, 11-8, 11-6, 11-6, and also lost the 3rd place match to Hollie Scott, 11-7, 11-5, 11-3.

Rajsich was a member of Team USA for the 2023 Pan American Racquetball Championships in Guatemala City, Guatemala. She played singles, and defeated Canadian Juliette Parent in the Round of 32, 9-11, 11-9, 11-7, 9-11, 11-8, and then lost to Mexican Paola Longoria in the Round of 16, 11-5, 11-5, 15-13.

Rajsich didn't compete in any USA Racquetball championship events in 2024, but she was in the 2025 USA Racquetball National Championships in Pleasanton, California, where she lost to Hollie Scott in the quarterfinals, 11-13, 11-6, 11-5, 11-7.

== Career summary ==
Rajsich is a two-time International Racquetball Federation (IRF) World Champion, winning Women's Singles in 2008 and 2010. Rajsich has also been Pan American Champion on six occasions: winning Women's Singles four times (2007, 2011, 2017 and 2018) and Women's Doubles twice (2007 and 2013). Overall, she has won more than two dozen medals representing the USA.

Nationally, Rajsich has a record 12 USA National Singles titles, as well as 3 USA National Doubles titles. She won two doubles titles with Kim Russell-Waselenchuk (2012 and 2015) and one with Erika Manilla (2021). Her other partners at US National Doubles include Mailia Bailey (2001), Laura Fenton (2002), Amy Foster (2003), Jo Shattuck (2004), then five years with Janel Tisinger (2006-2010) followed by five years with Russell-Waselenchuk (2011-2015) and - most recently - five years with Sheryl Lotts (2016-2019 and 2022).

Rajsich's women's pro racquetball career is highlighted by 11 appearances in the Women's Singles final of the US Open Racquetball Championships, racquetball's most prestigious pro event. She is 4–7 over those 11 finals. Her four US Open Women's Singles titles are second-most behind Paola Longoria's eleven.

Overall, Rajsich has appeared in 206 women's pro racquetball events (as of April 21, 2022), which is the most ever, reaching the finals 82 times and winning 28 of them. Her 28 career tournament wins are fifth all-time, behind Paola Longoria (105), Lynn Adams (47), Michelle Gould (43) and Cheryl Gudinas (40).

=== Career record ===
This table lists Rajsich's results across annual events.

Event	2000	2001	2002	2003	2004	2005	2006	2007	2008	2009	2010	2011	2012	2013	2014	2015	2016	2017	2018	2019	2020	2021	2022	2023	2024	2025
US Open	F	16	QF	W	F	F	QF	W	QF	W	W	F	F	F	SF	F	QF	SF	QF	16	P	QF				
USAR National Singles	SF	16	?	?	W	QF	W	W	SF	SF	3rd	W	W	W	W	W	W	W	W	SF	P	W	F	SF		QF
USAR National Doubles	QF	F	F	?	QF	?	F	3rd	F	F	F	SF	W	4th	F	W	F	4th	F	SF	P	W	SF	SF		
LPRT Rank		3	4	4	3	3	1	1	1	2	2	1	2	2	2	3	2	6	5	5	7	10	9			

Note: W = winner, F = finalist, SF = semi-finalist, QF = quarterfinalist, 16 = Round of 16, 32 = Round of 32, 64 = Round of 64, 128 = Round of 128. P = Pandemic.

== See also ==
- List of racquetball players

Sporting positions
Preceded by Christie Van Hees; Paola Longoria	Number 1 Women's Pro Racquetball Player; 2005–2006 to 2007–2008; 2010–2011 to 2011-12	Succeeded by Paola Longoria; Paola Longoria
