= María José Vargas =

Argentine racquetball player

Personal information
- Full name: María José Vargas Parada
- Nationality: Argentine, Bolivian
- Born: 18 March 1993 (age 33) Santa Cruz de la Sierra, Bolivia

Sport
- Country: Argentina
- Sport: Racquetball

Achievements and titles
- Highest world ranking: 1st (2023-24)
Medal record
Women's Racquetball
Representing Bolivia
Pan Am Games
Bronze medal – third place	2011 Guadalajara	Singles
Bronze medal – third place	2011 Guadalajara	Team
Representing Argentina
Event	1st	2nd	3rd
Pan American Games	0	6	2
World Championships	0	1	4
World Games	1	1	0
South American Games	3	0	0
Pan American Championships	9	5	2
Total	13	13	8
Pan Am Games
Silver medal – second place	2015 Toronto	Singles
Silver medal – second place	2015 Toronto	Doubles
Silver medal – second place	2019 Lima	Singles
Silver medal – second place	2019 Lima	Team
Silver medal – second place	2023 Santiago	Doubles
Silver medal – second place	2023 Santiago	Mixed doubles
Silver medal – second place	2023 Santiago	Team
Bronze medal – third place	2019 Lima	Doubles
Bronze medal – third place	2023 Santiago	Singles
World Championships
Bronze medal – third place	2024 San Antonio	Singles
Silver medal – second place	2024 San Antonio	Doubles
Bronze medal – third place	2024 San Antonio	Team
Bronze medal – third place	2018 San José	Singles
Bronze medal – third place	2014 Burlington	Singles
World Games
Gold medal – first place	2025 Chengdu	Singles
Silver medal – second place	2025 Chengdu	Mixed Doubles
Pan Am Championships
Gold medal – first place	2026 Guatemala	Singles
Gold medal – first place	2026 Guatemala	Doubles
Gold medal – first place	2026 Guatemala	Team
Gold medal – first place	2024 Guatemala	Singles
Gold medal – first place	2024 Guatemala	Doubles
Gold medal – first place	2024 Guatemala	Team
Silver medal – second place	2023 Guatemala	Singles
Bronze medal – third place	2023 Guatemala	Mixed Doubles
Gold medal – first place	2022 Santa Cruz	Doubles
Gold medal – first place	2022 Santa Cruz	Team
Silver medal – second place	2022 Santa Cruz	Singles
Silver medal – second place	2019 Barranquilla	Singles
Bronze medal – third place	2015 Santo Domingo	Singles
Silver medal – second place	2015 Santo Domingo	Doubles
Gold medal – first place	2014 Santa Cruz	Singles
Silver medal – second place	2014 Santa Cruz	Doubles
South American Games
Gold medal – first place	2018 Cochabamba	Singles
Gold medal – first place	2018 Cochabamba	Doubles
Gold medal – first place	2018 Cochabamba	Team

María José Vargas Parada (Note: In this Spanish name, the first or paternal surname is Vargas and the second or maternal family name is Parada.) (born 18 March 1993) is a Bolivian-born Argentine racquetball player. She is the current in World Games champion in Women's Singles, winning the title in Chengdu, China. Vargas is also the current Pan American Champion in singles, doubles and team events, as well as the current South American Racquetball Champion in Women's Singles and Doubles. Vargas has 16 wins on the Ladies Professional Racquetball Tour (LPRT), and was the LPRT's #1 player in 2023-24.

== 2006-2012 - Early years & playing for Bolivia ==
Vargas played at the International Racquetball Federation (IRF) World Junior Championships several times as a junior player, representing Bolivia. She won Girls U12 at the 2006 IRF World Junior Championships in Tempe, Arizona, defeating the USA's Devon Pimentelli in the final. She was a semi-finalist in Girls U14 in 2007 at World Juniors in Cochabamba, Bolivia, where she lost to Aubrey O'brien of the USA, 15-6, 14-15, 11-2.

Vargas and Yasmine Sabja took home bronze in Girls U16 Doubles from the 2008 World Junior Championships in Tempe, Arizona.

Vargas lost in the quarterfinals of Girls U16 at 2009 World Juniors in Santo Domingo, Dominican Republic to Aubrey O'brien of the USA, 15-4, 15-12. Also in Santo Domingo, Vargas played doubles with Yasmine Sabja, and they were runners-up in U18 Doubles to the USA's O'brien and Danielle Key, 13-15, 15-8, 11-0.

At 17, Vargas was selected to play in the 2010 World Championships in Seoul, South Korea, which was her first appearance at Worlds. She defeated Japan's Estuko Noda, 15-5, 3-15, 11-10, to reach the quarterfinals, where she lost to USA veteran Cheryl Gudinas, 15-9, 15-7. Vargas also played doubles in Seoul with Jenny Daza, and they lost to Japan's Naomi Wakimoto and Toshiko Sakamoto, 15-12, 15-2, in the quarterfinals. In the team competition, Bolivia lost to South Korea in the quarterfinals.

Vargas won Girls U16 at World Juniors in 2010, when she defeated the USA's Kelani Bailey in the final, 15-11, 12-15, 11-6. She also won U16 Doubles with Masiel Rivera, as they defeated Courtney Chisholm and Devon Pimentelli of the USA in the final, 15-9, 15-9.

In Santo Domingo, Dominican Republic, at the 2011 World Junior Championships, Vargas lost in the Girls U18 Singles final, 4-15, 15-7, 11-4, to Canadian Frédérique Lambert. But she did win Girls U18 Doubles that year with Adriana Riveros. They defeated Mexicans Sofia Rascon and Elena Robles, 15-11, 15-5.

Vargas played for Bolivia at the 2011 Pan American Games in Guadalajara, Mexico, where she was a bronze medalist in both Women's Singles and the Women's Team event. In singles, she beat Canadian Frédérique Lambert, 15-11, 15-8, in the Round of 16, and team-mate Jenny Daza in the quarterfinals, 15-6, 15-13, before losing in the semi-finals to the USA's Rhonda Rajsich, 15-6, 15-7. In the team event, Bolivia beat Chile in the quarterfinals, but lost to the USA in the semis.

Vargas played Women's Singles at the 2012 Pan American Championships in Temuco, Chile, where she lost in the Round of 16 to Cristina Amaya of Colombia, 15-3, 15-2.

Vargas's second appearance at Worlds was at the 2012 World Championships in Santo Domingo, Dominican Republic, where she played Women's Singles and the Women's Team event. Vargas defeated Dominican Claudine Garcia, 15-14, 15-6, in the Round of 32 and then lost to Mexican Paola Longoria, 15-9, 15-3, in the Round of 16. In the Women's Team event, Bolivia lost in Colombia, 2-1, in the Round of 16.

In her last year of junior eligibility, Vargas won Girls U18 at the 2012 World Junior Racquetball Championship in Los Angeles, California, where she defeated Bolivian team-mate Adriana Riveros in the final, 15-10, 15-5. Vargas and Riveros teamed up to win Girls U18 Doubles. Thus, Vargas ended her junior years with singles titles in two of her final three years, and three consecutive doubles titles.

Vargas began playing on the Ladies Professional Racquetball Tour (LPRT) in 2012. She made the semi-finals in Reseda, California in April 2013, which was only her 5th tournament. She lost that semi-final to Paola Longoria, 11-3, 11-3, 11-8, but that result helped her finish the LPRT season as the 10th ranked player, her 1st top 10 finish on tour. In December 2013, Vargas was named LPRT Rookie of the Year.

== 2014-2016 - Playing for Argentina ==
After not playing internationally in 2013, Vargas returned to international competition in 2014, but now she was playing for Argentina. Perhaps ironically, Vargas's 1st tournament for her adopted country was the 2014 Pan American Championships in Santa Cruz, Bolivia, her native land. In Santa Cruz, she played both Women's Singles and Women's Doubles. In singles, she beat Veronica Sotomayor of Ecuador in the quarterfinals, 15-13, 15-1, and Samantha Salas in the semi-finals, 15-7, 8-15, 11-2, to reach her 1st international final. Vargas won the final by defeating Mexico's Susana Acosta, 15-4, 15-8. In doubles, she and Véronique Guillemette beat Vargas's former team-mates Jenny Daza and Carola Loma of Bolivia, 15-8, 15-10, in the quarterfinals. Then in the semi-finals, they beat Maria Paz Muñoz and Veronica Sotomayor of Ecuador, 6-15, 15-11, 11-9. They lost the final to Mexicans Acosta and Samantha Salas, 10-15, 15-8, 11-7.

With the win in Santa Cruz, Vargas became the first player - man or woman - representing Argentina to win gold at the Pan Am Championships.

At the 2014 World Championships in Burlington, Ontario, Vargas reached the semi-finals by defeating Gabriela Martinez of Guatemala, 15-5, 15-5, in the Round of 16, and Canadian Christine Richardson, 15-6, 15-1, in the quarterfinals. In the semis, she lost to Mexican Paola Longoria, 15-5, 15-9, so she was a bronze medalist. At Worlds, Vargas again played Women's Doubles with Véronique Guillemette. They lost to Chileans Angela Grisar and Carla Muñoz, 8-15, 15-3, 11-8, in the quarterfinals.

The 2014-15 LPRT season was Vargas's best to date. Early in the season, she reached the final of the US Open Racquetball Championships - pro racquetball's biggest event - for the first time, but she lost to Paola Longoria in the final, 11-5, 11-3, 11-8. She was also in the LPRT Doubles final - partnering with Rhonda Rajsich, but losing to Longoria and Veronica Sotomayor.

In December 2014, she followed up that performance with a win at the 2014 LPRT Christmas Classic in Arlington, Virginia, where she beat Rajsich in the final, 5-11, 11-7, 11-7, 13-11. She defeated Alexandra Herrera in the semi-finals, 11-7, 11-1, 11-1, and Michelle Key in the quarterfinals, 11-4, 11-0, 11-5.

Vargas's second LPRT tour title came later in the 2014-15 season, as she beat Frédérique Lambert, 7-11, 11-6, 11-7, 11-3, in the final of the 2015 New Jersey Open. She beat Rhonda Rajsich in the semi-finals, 11-4, 2-11, 11-9, 11-4, and Susana Acosta in the quarterfinals, 3-11, 11-5, 11-5, 11-2. Overall, Vargas was in 9 finals, winning twice, in the 2014-15 LPRT season, and as a result she finished the season #2, a career high.

She reached the podium twice at the 2015 Pan American Championships in Santo Domingo, Dominican Republic. She was again the silver medalist in Women's Doubles with Véronique Guillemette, losing the final to Mexicans Paola Longoria and Samantha Salas, 15-4, 15-13. In Women's Singles, Vargas was a bronze medalist, losing the semi-finals to Longoria, 15-3, 15-8.

At the 2015 Pan American Games in Toronto, Vargas earned two silver medals: in Women's Singles and Women's Doubles with Véronique Guillemette. In the singles final, Vargas lost to Paola Longoria of Mexico, 15-12, 15-9, and in the doubles final, Vargas and Guillemette lost to Longoria and Samantha Salas, 15-3, 15-4. In the Women's Team event, Vargas and Guillemette lost in the quarterfinals to Canadians Frédérique Lambert and Jennifer Saunders. Nevertheless, Vargas's medals were the first Pan American Games silver medals won by an Argentine player in racquetball.

== 2017-2021 - Career resumes ==
Vargas had a child in 2016, so she didn't play in the 2016-17 LPRT season. She came back to the LPRT after 17 months at the 2017 US Open, when she lost to Rhonda Rajsich in the Round of 32, 11-3, 11-4, 11-4. That was the only tournament Vargas played in 2017, but she played most of the LPRT events in 2018, including the 2018 Peachtree Open, which she won in March 2018. It was her third LPRT win. She was in the final with Frédérique Lambert, and Lambert had to forfeit the match. Nonetheless, it was an impressive win, as Vargas was seeded 16th, so in order to reach the final, she had to beat top seed Jessica Parrilla, 11-8, 11-9, 11-8, in the Round of 16, 8th seed Adriana Riveros, 11-1, 5-11, 11-4, 11-9, in the quarterfinals, and 4th seed Alexandra Herrera, 11-8, 11-3, 11-3, in the semi-finals. The win helped Vargas finish 9th at the end of the 2017-18 LPRT season. It was her 5th time in the season ending top 10.

She returned to international competition in March 2018 at the 2018 Pan American Championships in Temuco, Chile. But in Vargas's return she lost in the quarterfinals of both singles and doubles albeit to the eventual champions. In Women's Singles, she lost to the USA's Rhonda Rajsich, 15-10, 15-5. In Women's Doubles, she and Natalia Mendez lost to Mexicans Paola Longoria and Alexandra Herrera, 15-14, 15-6.

Vargas was a triple gold medalist at the 2018 South American Games in Cochabamba, Bolivia. In Women's Singles, she defeated Carla Muñoz of Chile, 15-5, 13-15, 11-5, in the semi-finals, and Bolivian Yasmine Sabja, 15-4, 15-6. In Women's Doubles, Vargas and Natalia Mendez beat Bolivians Stefanny Barrios and Jenny Daza, in the doubles final, 15-11, 15-10. They also defeated Bolivia in the Women's Team competition.

At the 2018 World Championships in San José, Costa Rica, Vargas played singles and doubles for Argentina. In Women's Singles, she reached the semi-finals with a win over Bolivian Yasmine Sabja, her former doubles partner from junior days, 15-2, 15-7. Vargas lost the semi-final to Mexican Paola Longoria, 6-15, 15-2, 11-7. She played Women's Doubles with Natalia Mendez, and they lost in the quarterfinals to Guatemalans Gabriela Martinez and Maria Renee Rodriguez, 15-2, 15-8.

Vargas won her 4th LPRT title in March 2019, when she outlasted Samantha Salas in the final of the Open Bolivia American Iris tournament in Cochabamba, Bolivia, winning 11-8, 10-12, 11-13, 11-3, 11-9. That was the only final she was in during the 2018-19 LPRT season, but she did reach four semi-finals, and finished the LPRT season ranked 3rd.

At the 2019 Pan American Championships in Barranquilla, Colombia, Vargas was a finalist in Women's Singles, as she beat USA veteran Rhonda Rajsich in the quarterfinals, 15-4, 15-8, and Argentina team-mate Natalia Mendez, 15-9, 14-15, 11-7, in the semi-finals. In the final, Vargas lost to Mexico's Paola Longoria, 15-7, 15-2. In Women's Doubles, Vargas and Mendez beat Chileans Carla Muñoz and Josefa Parada, 15-7, 15-8, in the Round of 16, but they lost in the quarterfinals to Longoria and Samantha Salas of Mexico, 15-7, 15-6.

Vargas played at the 2019 Pan American Games in Lima, Peru, which was her 3rd Pan Am Games. She was a finalist in Women's Singles. She beat the USA's Kelani Lawrence, 15-9, 15-13, in the quarterfinals, and her old Bolivian team-mate Adriana Riveros, who was now representing Colombia, 15-8, 15-9, in the semi-finals. Vargas lost to Mexican Paola Longoria, 15-7, 15-9, in the final. In Women's Doubles, she and Natalia Mendez beat Canadians Frédérique Lambert and Jennifer Saunders, 15-9, 15-9, in the quarterfinals, but lost to Guatemalans Gabriela Martinez and Maria Renee Rodriguez in the semi-finals, 15-9, 10-15, 11-1. Then in the Women's Team event, Vargas and Mendez were runners-up to Mexico. Thus, Vargas took home three medals - two silver and one bronze - from Lima.

In the 2019-20 LPRT season Vargas was in six finals, winning once. She defeated Paola Longoria in September 2019 at the LPRT By The Beach tournament in Virginia Beach, Virginia, winning 7-15, 15-12, 11-4, in the final for her 5th win on tour.

== 2022-present - Play resumes post-COVID-19 ==
At the 2022 Pan American Racquetball Championships in Santa Cruz de la Sierra, Bolivia, Vargas won Women's Doubles with Natalia Mendez, beating Mexicans Alexandra Herrera and Samantha Salas in the final, 15-14, 14-15, 15-10, 8-15, 11-9. Vargas and Mendez also defeated Mexico to win the Women's Team title. She played Women's Singles as well, and lost in the final to Bolivian Angelica Barrios, 14-15, 10-15, 15-10, 15-14, 12-10.

Vargas got two medals at the 2023 Pan American Racquetball Championships in Guatemala City, Guatemala: a silver in singles and bronze in mixed doubles. In singles, she defeated Costa Rican Maricruz Ortiz in the semi-finals, 11-2, 11-6, 11-9, but lost the final to Mexican Montserrat Mejia, 11-8, 11-6, 11-9. In mixed doubles, she and Diego Garcia lost to Mexicans Paola Longoria and Rodrigo Montoya in the semi-finals, 11-3, 11-6, 9-11, 17-15.

At the 2023 Pan American Games in Santiago, Chile, Vargas earned four medals: three silver and one bronze. In singles, she lost in the semi-finals to Mexican Paola Longoria, 11-7, 11-8, 6-11, 11-7. Vargas and Natalia Mendez played Women's Doubles, and they defeated Americans Michelle Key and Erika Manilla in the quarterfinals, 10-12, 11-9, 11-5, 12-10, and Mexicans Alexandra Herrera and Montserrat Mejia in the semi-finals, 5-11, 11-13, 3-11, 11-7, 11-7. But they lost the final to Guatemalans Gabriela Martinez and Maria Renee Rodriguez, 11-2, 8-11, 14-12, 11-6. In Mixed Doubles, Vargas and Diego Garcia defeated Bolivians Angélica Barrios and Conrrado Moscoso in the semi-finals, 9-11, 11-8, 11-8, 10-12, 11-9, but lost the final to Americans Adam Manilla and Erika Manilla, 11-4, 11-4, 11-6. Finally, in the Women's Team event, Vargas and Mendez were runners up to the Mexican team.

Vargas won three gold medals at the 2024 Pan American Racquetball Championships. In singles, she defeated Chilean Carla Muñoz in the final, 11-1, 11-3, 11-5. In doubles, she and Natalia Mendez defeated Americans Naomi Ros and Lexi York in the final, 7-11, 11-8, 10-12, 11-9, 11-9. They also won the Women's Team competition, defeating the Dominican Republic in the final.

At the 2024 World Championships in San Antonio, Texas, Vargas won three medals. She and Natalia Mendez got silver in Women's Doubles, losing in the final to Mexicans Alexandra Herrera and Montserrat Mejia, 11-3, 9-11, 15-13, 7-11, 11-7. She also helped Argentina to silver in the Women's Team event, as losing to Mexico in the final. Vargas also played singles at Worlds, earning a bronze medal, as she defeated American Kelani Lawrence in the quarterfinals, 8-11, 12-14, 14-12, 11-7, 11-8, but lost to Mexican Paola Longoria in the semi-finals, 11-9, 16-14, 9-11, 11-5.

Vargas won gold in Women's singles at the 2025 World Games in Chengdu, China, as she defeated Mexican Paola Longoria in the final, 6-11, 11-8, 12-10, 11-9. She also played Mixed Doubles in Chengdu with Diego Garcia, and they lost in the final to Americans Jake Bredenbeck and Naomi Ros, 11-7, 11-9, 11-6, so Vargas came home with two medals - the first World Games racquetball medals won by an Argentine woman.

== Career summary ==
Vargas was the #1 player on the Ladies Professional Racquetball Tour (LPRT) in 2023-24, when she won five of the eight tournaments that season. She's been ranked in the LPRT top 10 twelve times, tied for 5th most all time. Internationally, Vargas initially played for her native Bolivia, earning two medals, but since then she has played for Argentina, winning many medals, including gold at the World Games, Pan American Championships and the South American Games.

=== Career record ===
This table lists Vargas's results across annual events.

Event	2012	2013	2014	2015	2016	2017	2018	2019	2020	2021	2022	2023	2024	2025
US Open	32	16	F	SF	-	32	32	F	P	F	-	-	-	-
LPRT Rank	-	10	3	2	3	-	9	3	2	4	3	7	1	2

== See also ==
- List of racquetball players

== Notes ==
Sporting positions
Preceded by Montserrat Mejia	Number 1 Women's Pro Racquetball Player; 2023-2024	Succeeded by Paola Longoria
