= Paola Longoria =

Mexican racquetball player

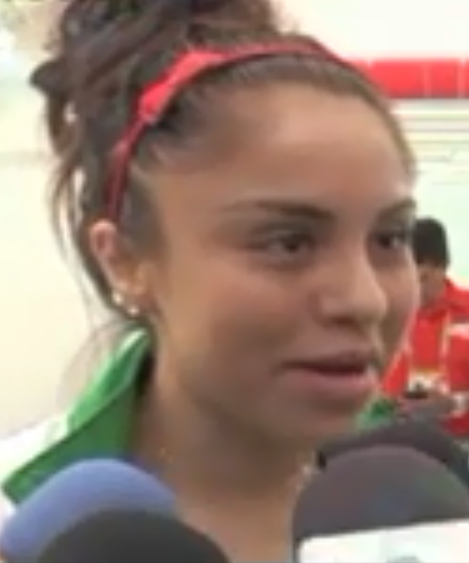
- Longoria in 2014

Personal information
- Born: 20 July 1989 (age 37) San Luis Potosí, Mexico

Sport
- Sport: Racquetball
- Coached by: Fran Davis
Medal record
Women's Racquetball
Representing Mexico
Event	1st	2nd	3rd
Pan American Games	11	0	1
World Championships	14	2	4
World Games	3	1	0
Central American and Caribbean Games	13	0	0
Pan American Championships	15	4	3
Total	56	7	8
Pan American Games
Gold medal – first place	2023 Santiago	Women's team
Gold medal – first place	2023 Santiago	Women's singles
Bronze medal – third place	2023 Santiago	Mixed doubles
Gold medal – first place	2019 Lima	Women's singles
Gold medal – first place	2019 Lima	Women's doubles
Gold medal – first place	2019 Lima	Women's team
Gold medal – first place	2015 Toronto	Women's singles
Gold medal – first place	2015 Toronto	Women's doubles
Gold medal – first place	2015 Toronto	Women's team
Gold medal – first place	2011 Guadalajara	Women's singles
Gold medal – first place	2011 Guadalajara	Women's doubles
Gold medal – first place	2011 Guadalajara	Women's team
Central American and Caribbean Games
Gold medal – first place	2023 San Salvador	Women's singles
Gold medal – first place	2023 San Salvador	Mixed doubles
Gold medal – first place	2023 San Salvador	Women's team
Gold medal – first place	2018 Barranquilla	Women's singles
Gold medal – first place	2018 Barranquilla	Women's doubles
Gold medal – first place	2018 Barranquilla	Women's team
Gold medal – first place	2014 Veracruz	Women's singles
Gold medal – first place	2014 Veracruz	Women's doubles
Gold medal – first place	2014 Veracruz	Women's team
Gold medal – first place	2010 Mayagüez	Women's singles
Gold medal – first place	2010 Mayagüez	Women's team
Gold medal – first place	2006 Cartagena	Women's singles
Gold medal – first place	2006 Cartagena	Women's team
World Championships
Gold medal – first place	2024 San Antonio	Singles
Gold medal – first place	2024 San Antonio	Team
Gold medal – first place	2022 San Luis Potosi	Singles
Gold medal – first place	2022 San Luis Potosi	Doubles
Gold medal – first place	2022 San Luis Potosi	Team
Gold medal – first place	2021 Guatemala City	Singles
Gold medal – first place	2021 Guatemala City	Doubles
Silver medal – second place	2018 San José	Singles
Gold medal – first place	2016 Cali	Singles
Silver medal – second place	2016 Cali	Doubles
Gold medal – first place	2014 Burlington	Singles
Gold medal – first place	2014 Burlington	Doubles
Gold medal – first place	2012 Santo Domingo	Singles
Gold medal – first place	2012 Santo Domingo	Doubles
Gold medal – first place	2012 Santo Domingo	Team
Gold medal – first place	2010 Seoul	Doubles
Bronze medal – third place	2010 Seoul	Singles
Bronze medal – third place	2010 Seoul	Team
Bronze medal – third place	2008 Kingscourt	Singles
Bronze medal – third place	2008 Kingscourt	Doubles
Pan Am Championships
Silver medal – second place	2023 Guatemala City	Mixed Doubles
Gold medal – first place	2019 Barranquilla	Singles
Gold medal – first place	2019 Barranquilla	Doubles
Silver medal – second place	2018 Temuco	Singles
Gold medal – first place	2018 Temuco	Doubles
Silver medal – second place	2017 San Jose	Singles
Gold medal – first place	2017 San Jose	Doubles
Gold medal – first place	2016 San Luis Potosi	Singles
Gold medal – first place	2016 San Luis Potosi	Doubles
Gold medal – first place	2015 Santo Domingo	Singles
Gold medal – first place	2015 Santo Domingo	Doubles
Gold medal – first place	2013 Cali	Singles
Gold medal – first place	2012 Temuco	Singles
Gold medal – first place	2012 Temuco	Doubles
Bronze medal – third place	2011 Managua	Singles
Gold medal – first place	2011 Managua	Doubles
Gold medal – first place	2010 San Pedro Sula	Singles
Bronze medal – third place	2009 Cali	Singles
Silver medal – second place	2009 Cali	Doubles
Gold medal – first place	2008 San Jose	Singles
Bronze medal – third place	2007 Santiago	Singles
Gold medal – first place	2006 Guatemala City	Singles
World Games
Gold medal – first place	2022 Birminghan	Singles
Gold medal – first place	2013 Cali	Singles
Gold medal – first place	2009 Kaohsiung	Singles
Silver medal – second place	2025 Chengdu	Singles

Paola Michelle Longoria López (born 20 July 1989) is a Mexican racquetball player. She is the current Women's World Champion in Singles and the Team event, winning both divisions at the International Racquetball Federation (IRF) 2024 World Championships in San Antonio, Texas. Longoria is the most winning player in IRF World Championship history, and she is the only woman to win both singles and doubles at Worlds. Longoria is also the #1 player on the Ladies Professional Racquetball Tour (LPRT) tour, and was the first Mexican woman to attain the #1 pro ranking, doing so at the end of the 2008–09 season. She repeated the feat at the end of 2009–2010 season, and has been #1 for ten consecutive seasons. Longoria's style is characterized by a semi-western grip of the racquet, which is unusual for racquetball; Longoria is the only pro player using this grip style.

In the 2024 general election she was elected to the Chamber of Deputies as a plurinominal deputy for the Citizens' Movement (MC).

== Junior competitions - 2001-2008 ==
Longoria began playing racquetball at eight years old when she was at a summer camp, and describes the experience as love at first sight and decided to devote her passion and effort to the sport. Longoria won eight consecutive International Racquetball Federation (IRF) World Junior Championships from 2001 to 2008, winning twice in each age category: 12U, 14U, 16U, and 18U. Longoria also won six Girl's Doubles titles at World Juniors. She won Girls 12U doubles with Eleni Guzman in 2001, and the pair won Girls 14U doubles in 2002 and 2003, as well as Girls 16U doubles in 2005. Longoria won Girls 14U doubles with Luisa Aldrete in 2004 and she won Girls 18U doubles in 2008 with Arantza Loredo.

== Beginning on the pro tour & playing for Mexico - 2004-2007 ==
Longoria played at the US Open Racquetball Championships for a second time in 2004, when she reached the quarterfinals before losing to then defending champion Rhonda Rajsich, 11–5, 11–8, 11–1. She got to the quarters by defeating 6th seed Adrienne Haynes, 11–7, 11–2, 11–3, in the Round of 32, and Susana Acosta, 14–12, 11–6, 4–11, 11–6, in the Round of 16, and impressed Rajsich in the quarters such that she commented "Watch out for that one," said Rajsich, adding "It's refreshing to see someone so young play so tough.” Explaining her performance, Longoria said "I am not intimidated because I don't think that it is impossible to win against them."

At 16, Longoria made her first appearance on the Mexico National Team when she played Women's Singles at the 2006 Pan American Championships in Guatemala City, where she won gold, beating American Kristen Walsh Bellows in the final, 15–6, 15–6. Longoria's second appearance for Mexico was at the 2006 Central American and Caribbean Games, where she won Women's Singles - defeating Dominican Republic's Claudine Garcia in the final, and was also part of the Mexican team that won the Women's Team event.

After turning 17 in July 2006, Longoria played at the IRF World Championships for the first time in Santo Domingo, Dominican Republic, where she reached the quarterfinals and lost to Canadian Jennifer Saunders. In the Women's Team event, Mexico were bronze medalists, beating Bolivia in the quarterfinals and losing to the US in the semi-finals, so Longoria got a bronze medal from her first World Championships.

She had a chance to defend her Pan American Championship in 2007 in Santiago, Chile, as she defeated Canadian Jennifer Saunders in the quarterfinals, but in the semi-finals, she lost to American Rhonda Rajsich, 15–14, 15–14. Thus, Longoria came away from Santiago with a bronze medal.

Longoria got to her first pro final in May 2007 at the Ektelon Pro Nationals in New Orleans, Louisiana. She was the 14th seed, but upset 3rd seed Kerri Wachtel in the Round of 16, 6th seed Kristen Walsh Bellows in the quarterfinals, 2nd seed Cheryl Gudinas in the semi-finals, before losing to top seed Rhonda Rajsich in the final. That result helped her finish 12th in the season ending rankings.

A few months later, in September 2007, Longoria won her first women's pro tournament in Fayetteville, North Carolina, where she defeated Kerri Wachtel in the quarterfinals, Kristen Walsh Bellows in the semi-finals, and Rhonda Rajsich in the final, 12–14, 11–8, 9–11, 11–6, 11–7. Then in November 2007, Longoria matched her career best finish at the US Open Racquetball Championships in Memphis, where she reached the quarterfinals and then lost to Rajsich.

== 1st US Open title and becomes LPRT #1 - 2008-2011 ==
Longoria won her 2nd Pan American Championship in 2008 in San José, Costa Rica, where she narrowly defeated Canadian Jennifer Saunders in the semi-finals, 15–6, 6–15, 11–10, and then beat Rhonda Rajsich in the final, 15–10, 15–9.

She finished the 2007-08 Ladies Professional Racquetball Tour (LPRT) season at #6, her first season in the top 10, as she had her first win, and was in the semi-finals twice and quarterfinals three times.

At the 2008 IRF World Championships in Kingscourt, Ireland, Longoria earned bronze medals in both Women's Singles and Women's Doubles. In singles, she defeated Canadian Josée Grand'Maître in the quarterfinals, 15–10, 15–8, and then lost to American Rhonda Rajsich, 15–10, 15–9, in the semi-finals. Longoria played doubles with Rosy Torres, and they defeated Bolivians Carola Loma and Jenny Daza in the quarters, 15–12, 15–6, then lost to Canadians Genevieve Brodeur and Véronique Guillemette in the semis, 3–15, 15–6, 11–9. In the Women's Team event, Mexico was upset by Chile, 2–1. Longoria and Torres won the first match of the quarterfinal defeating Angela Grisar and Fabiola Marquez, 15–4, 15–1. But in the singles matches, Grisar defeated Longoria, 15–12, 7–15, 11–7, and Marquez beat Susana Acosta, 15–11, 11–15, 11–4.

Longoria won her first US Open title in 2008 as the 5th seed. She defeated Kerri Wachtel in the quarterfinals, Brenda Kyzer in the semi-finals, and Cheryl Gudinas in the final, 11–8, 7–11, 11–7, 11–7. Her win was the first US Open title for a Mexican player, as well as the first time a Mexican was in the US Open final. She won three other times on tour, and finished #1 at the end of the 2008-09 LPRT season for the first time.

At the 2009 Pan American Championships in Cali, Colombia, Longoria came away with two medals: bronze in singles and silver in doubles. In Women's Singles, she lost to Cheryl Gudinas in the semi-finals, 5–15, 15–10, 11–8, and in Women's Doubles, she reached the finals with Samantha Salas by defeating Bolivians Carola Loma and Jenny Daza in the semis, 15–8, 15–12, but lost to Americans Aimee Ruiz and Jackie Paraiso, 15–6, 15–8, in final.

Longoria qualified for the 2009 World Games in Kaohsiung, Taiwan based on her performance at the 2008 World Championships. She won gold in the women's singles event. Longoria beat Canadian Josée Grand'Maître in the quarterfinals, 15–8, 15–9, American Cheryl Gudinas in the semi-finals, 15–6, 11–15, 11–7, and American Rhonda Rajsich in the final, 5–15, 15–7, 11–5. It was the first time racquetball was in the World Games since 1995.

Longoria got to her second US Open final in 2009, but she lost to Rhonda Rajsich, 1–11, 11–8, 11–3, 2–11, 11–7. That was one of only three losses for Longoria on tour in 2009–10, as she won five tournaments, and again finished #1.

She won her 3rd Pan American Championship in 2010 in San Pedro Sula, Honduras, where she defeated the Dominican Republic's Claudine Garcia in the semi-finals, 15–1, 15–8, and Canadian Jennifer Saunders in the final, 15–10, 15–11.

Longoria successfully defended her Central American and Caribbean Games title at the 2010 games in Puerto Rico, where she defeated Claudine Garcia of the Dominican Republic in the Women's Singles final, 15–2, 15–8. She also won gold in the Women's Team event.

At the 2010 Racquetball World Championships in Seoul, South Korea, Longoria earned three medals. Her best result was in Women's Doubles, which she won with Samantha Salas. They beat Canadians Brandi Jacobson Prentice and Frédérique Lambert in the semi-finals, 15–8, 15–6, then Americans Aimee Ruiz and Jackie Paraiso in final, 13–15, 15–13, 11–4, to claim Mexico's first women's World Championship. In Women's Singles, she reached the semi-finals by defeating Jin Young Seok of South Korea, 15–3, 15–4, in the quarterfinals, but lost to Rhonda Rajsich, 9–15, 15–10, 11–5, in the semi-finals, resulting in a bronze medal. Longoria also earned bronze in the Women's Team event, as Mexico defeated Japan in the quarterfinals, 2–1, but lost to the US in the semis, 2–1.

Longoria won gold in Women's Doubles with Samantha Salas at the 2011 Pan American Championships in Managua, Nicaragua. They defeated Canadians Josée Grand'Maître and Brandi Jacobson Prentice in the semi-finals, 15–10, 15–0, and Americans Rhonda Rajsich and Krystal Csuk in the final, 14–15, 15–7, 11–5. She also played Women's Singles, defeating Colombia's Cristina Amaya in the Round of 16, 15–12, 15–10, and Bolivian Adriana Riveros in the quarterfinals, 15–4, 15–7, but lost to Rajsich in the semi-finals, 15–11, 6–15, 11–5.

On the pro tour, Longoria won five tournaments in the 2010–11 season, and was in the final four other times, including at the 2010 US Open Racquetball Championships in Minneapolis, where she lost to Rhonda Rajsich in the final, 11–8, 8–11, 11–9, 11–5. Overall, Longoria finished the season #2 behind Rajsich.

Longoria won three gold medals for Mexico at the 2011 Pan American Games in Guadalajara, Mexico. In Women's Singles, she beat teammate Samantha Salas in the quarterfinals, 15–7, 15–5, American Cheryl Gudinas in the semi-finals, 15–7, 15–10, and American Rhonda Rajsich in the final, 12–15, 15–10, 11–9. In Women's Doubles she and Salas defeated Chileans Angela Grisar and Carla Muñoz in the semi-finals, 15–5, 15–5, and Americans Aimee Ruiz and Rajsich in the final, 15–12, 5–15, 11–5. Mexico also won the Women's Team event by defeating Ecuador in the semi-finals, and the US in the final (Longoria defeating Rajsich, 2–1, as part of the victory).

She won her second US Open title in October 2011, when she beat Samantha Salas in the semi-finals, 11–5, 11–4, 11–8, and Rhonda Rajsich in the final, 11–7, 11–5, 11–9. That was one of seven LPRT wins for Longoria in 2011-12 that made her #1 at season's end for the third time.

== Dominance begins - 2012-2017 ==
Longoria began a period of dominance on the Ladies Professional Racquetball Tour in the 2011–12 season. She did not lose an LPRT match from May 2011 to October 2014, a period of three and half years. Coincidentally, the streak began after she lost in Stockton, California to Rhonda Rajsich and ended there, when Rajsich also defeated her.

She was a double gold medalist at the 2012 Pan American Racquetball Championships in Temuco, Chile, winning both Women's Singles and Doubles. In singles, Longoria defeated Bolivian Carola Loma in the semi-finals, 15–9, 15–11, and Canadian Frédérique Lambert in the final, as Lambert had to retire due to injury in the first game. In doubles, Longoria and Samantha Salas defeated Colombians Cristina Amaya and Carolina Gomez in the semis, 15–3, 15–0, and Bolivians Loma and Jenny Daza in final, 15–6, 9–15, 11–7.

Longoria was a triple gold medalist at the 2012 World Championships in Santo Domingo, Dominican Republic, winning Women's Singles, Doubles and the Team event. In singles, she defeated American Rhonda Rajsich in the semi-finals, 15–2, 15–12, and Canadian Jennifer Saunders in final, 15–11, 15–2, and the win was the first for a Mexican in Women's Singles at Worlds. In doubles, she and Samantha Salas successfully defended the title they first won two years before by beating Canadians Josée Grand'Maître and Frédérique Lambert in the semis, 15–13, 15–7, then Chileans Angela Grisar and Carla Muñoz in final, 15–5, 15–4. In the Women's Team event, Mexico defeated Chile, 2–0, in quarters, Canada, 2–1 in the semis, and the US, 2–0, in final.

She won her third US Open title in October 2012, defeating Veronica Sotomayor in the semi-finals, 11–6, 11–4, 11–1, and Rhonda Rajsich in the final, 11–4, 11–7, 12–10. That was one of Longoria's 11 LPRT wins in the 2012–13 season putting her on top of rankings for the fourth time.

She won two medals at the 2013 Pan American Championships in Cali, Colombia, winning Women's Singles and finishing second in Women's Doubles. In singles, Longoria beat American Sharon Jackson in the semi-finals, 15–8, 15–3, and American Rhonda Rajsich in the final, 15–5, 15–6. In doubles, Longoria and Samantha Salas defeated Chileans Angela Grisar and Carla Muñoz in the semis, 15–13, 15–1, but lost to Jackson and Rajsich in the final, 15–5, 15–7.

Longoria competed at the 2013 World Games in Cali, Colombia, where she won gold in Women's Singles. She defeated American Rhonda Rajsich, 15–8, 15–14, in the semi-finals, and held off Colombian Cristina Amaya in the final, 15–10, 10–15, 11–4.

She won her fourth US Open title in October 2013, defeating Samantha Salas in the semi-finals, 11–1, 11–4, 11–3, and Rhonda Rajsich in the final, 11–4, 11–1, 11–7. That win was one of Longoria's 12 LPRT wins in the 2013–14 season getting her a fifth #1 ranking at season's end.

Longoria won two gold medals at the 2014 World Championships in Burlington, Ontario, Canada, winning Women's Singles and Doubles. In singles, she defeated Argentina's Maria Jose Vargas in the semi-finals, 15–5, 15–9, and American Rhonda Rajsich in final, 15–6, 15–8. In doubles, she and Samantha Salas won Women's Doubles for the third consecutive time by beating Chileans Angela Grisar and Carla Muñoz in the semis, 15–1, 15–3, and then Americans Aimee Ruiz and Janel Tisinger in final, 15–4, 15–12.

She won her fifth US Open title in October 2014, defeating Cristina Amaya in the semi-finals, 11–4, 11–3, 11–3, and Maria Jose Vargas in the final, 11–5, 11–3, 11–8. For the first time, the US Open had an LPRT doubles division, which Longoria also won, as she and Veronica Sotomayor defeated Vargas and Rhonda Rajsich in the final, 15–7, 12–15, 11–7.

But a week after winning the 2014 US Open, Longoria's LPRT winning streak came to and end, as Rajsich defeated her in Stockton, California, 11–9, 5–11, 14–12, 5–11, 11–4. She lost a second time in the 2014–15 season, when Frédérique Lambert beat her in the semi-finals of the LPRT New Jersey Open in March 2015, 11–7, 12–10, 7–11, 11–5. It was Longoria's first loss in the semi-finals of a LPRT event since September 2009. Nonetheless, Longoria - with 10 tournament wins in 2014-15 - was the #1 LPRT player for a sixth time.

Longoria was a double gold medalist at the 2015 Pan American Championships in Santo Domingo, Dominican Republic, winning both Women's Singles and Women's Doubles. In singles, Longoria beat Argentine Maria Jose Vargas in the semi-finals, 15–3, 15–8, and Ecuador's Veronica Sotomayor in the final, 15–2, 15–5. In doubles, Longoria and Samantha Salas defeated Colombians Cristina Amaya and Carolina Gomez in the semis, 15–6, 15–3, and Argentina's Véronique Guillemette and Vargas in the final, 15–4, 15–13.

Longoria won three gold medals for Mexico at the 2015 Pan American Games in Toronto, where she won all three women's competitions: Women's Singles, Women's Doubles and the Women's Team event. In the singles, she beat Gabriela Martinez of Guatemala, 15–3, 15–6, in the Round of 16, Bolivian Carola Loma, 15–1, 15–2, American Rhonda Rajsich, 15–13, 15–9, in the semi-finals and in the gold medal match, Maria Jose Vargas of Argentina, 15–12, 15–9. Longoria played doubles with Samantha Salas, and they defeated Maria Paz Muñoz and Veronica Sotomayor of Ecuador in the semi-finals, 15–10, 15–12, and then Vargas and Véronique Guillemette in the final, 15–3, 15–4. In the team event, Mexico defeated Ecuador in the semi-finals, 2–1, and the US in the final, 2–0.

Longoria was the 2015 US Open by defeating Veronica Sotomayor in the semi-finals, 10–12, 11–7, 11–3, 11–3, and Rhonda Rajsich in the final, 11–7, 11–5, 9–11, 11–9. That win was part of 4th undefeated LPRT season for Longoria and she finished the 2015–16 season at #1 for a 7th time.

In 2016, Longoria won gold in both Women's Singles and Women's Doubles, with Samantha Salas, at the Pan American Championships in San Luis Potosi, Mexico. In singles, she defeated Jenny Daza of Bolivia in the semi-finals, 15–13, 15–5, and Canadian Frédérique Lambert in final, 15–3, 15–6. In doubles, she and Salas defeated Lambert and Jennifer Saunders in semi-finals, 15–5, 15–8, and Americans Michelle Key and Kelani Bailey in final, 15–5, 15–10.

Longoria won a third Women's Singles World title at the 2016 World Championships in Cali, Colombia, where she defeated Argentina's Maria Jose Vargas in the semi-finals, 15–5, 15–5, and Guatemalan Gabriela Martinez in final, 15–12, 15–5. She and Samantha Salas were going for a fourth title in Women's Doubles, and reached the final by defeating Bolivians Adriana Riveros and Jenny Daza in the semis, 15–5, 15–5, but were upset in the final by Americans Aimee Ruiz and Janel Tisinger, 15–11, 9–15, 11–8.

In 2016, Longoria and Samantha Salas faced off in the final of the US Open with Longoria coming out on top, 11–3, 11–7, 11–3. She won the title without losing a game over five matches, and only gave up more than three points once - to Salas in game two of the final. Longoria and Salas won the US Open LPRT Doubles title that year by beating Frédérique Lambert and Veronica Sotomayor in the final, 15–10, 15–0. She won 10 of the 11 LPRT events in the 2016–17 season, finishing #1 for an 8th time. Her loss came at the last event of the season, when Salas defeated her in Chihuahua, Mexico, 7–11, 7–11, 11–8, 11–9, 11–9.

In 2017, Longoria lost to American Rhonda Rajsich in the final of the Pan American Championships in San José, Costa Rica, 7–15, 15–13, 11–9, which ended a string of 10 consecutive Women's Singles gold medals for Longoria at international events dating back to 2011, when she lost to Rajsich in the semi-finals of the Pan American Championships. However, Longoria and Samantha Salas won Women's Doubles in San Jose, defeating Americans Sheryl Lotts and Rajsich in the semi-finals, 15–8, 15–4, and Veronica Sotomayor and Maria Paz Muñoz of Ecuador in the final, 15–12, 15–5.

Longoria won her 8th US Open title in 2017, when she defeated Rhonda Rajsich in the semi-finals, 11–7, 11–5, 11–6, and Frédérique Lambert, 11–7, 11–4, 2–11, 11–3, in the final. She again won LPRT Doubles at the US Open, but this time with Gabriela Martinez. They defeated Sheryl Lotts and Rajsich in the semi-finals, 15–9, 15–9, and then Cristina Amaya and Adriana Riveros, 15–5, 15–8, in the final. The wins were part of another successful LPRT season for Longoria, in which she lost only once and finished #1 for a 9th time at the end of the 2017–18 season. Her loss was to Samantha Salas in the final of the Battle at the Alamo in San Antonio, where Salas won 5–11, 5–11, 11–9, 11–9, 11–4.

== World championships lost and won - 2018-present ==
In 2018, Longoria lost a round robin match at the Pan American Championships in Temuco, Chile to Maria Jose Vargas, 12–15, 15–13, 11–9. The loss meant Longoria was not the #1 seed for the medal round. Nevertheless, she reached the final, including a win over teammate Samantha Salas in the semi-finals, 15–12, 15–6. The final was a repeat of the 2017 final, and Longoria again lost to Rajsich, 15–3, 14–15, 11–7. Although Longoria was a silver medalist in singles in Temuco, she won gold in Women's Doubles, as she and Alexandra Herrera defeated the Guatemala team of Gabriela Martinez and Maria Renee Rodriguez in the final, 9–15, 15–1, 11–8.

Longoria went to the 2018 World Championships in San José, Costa Rica as the three-time defending champion in Women's Singles. She defeated Argentina's Maria Jose Vargas, 6–15, 15–2, 11–7, in the semi-finals, but was upset in the final by Guatemala's Gabriela Martinez, 8–15, 15–6, 11–6. It was Longoria's first loss at Worlds since 2010.

She won a 9th US Open in 2018, and got to the final with a win over Gabriela Martinez in the semi-finals, 11–5, 11–0, 11–3, just a few months after losing to Martinez at Worlds. In the final, she faced Samantha Salas for a second US Open final, and once again defeated her: 11–9, 11–2, 11–5. They played doubles together and won the title by defeating Alexandra Herrera and Montserrat Mejia in the final, 15–11, 15–14. These wins were part of a 5th undefeated LPRT season for Longoria, who finished #1 for a 10th time.

Longoria was a double gold medalist at the 2019 Pan American Racquetball Championships in Barranquilla, Colombia, where in Women's Singles she defeated Valeria Centellas of Bolivia in the quarterfinals, 14–15, 15–4, 11–7, Ecuador's Maria Paz Muñoz in semi-finals, 15–5, 15–3, and Argentina's Maria Jose Vargas in final, 15–7, 15–2. Longoria played Women's Doubles with Samantha Salas in Barranquilla, and they defeated Natalia Mendez and Vargas in the quarters, 15–7, 15–6, Bolivians Yazmine Sabja and Centellas in the semis, 15–2, 15–6, and Colombians Cristina Amaya and Adriana Riveros in final, 15–8, 15–6.

For a third time, Longoria won three gold medals for Mexico at a Pan American Games, as she swept gold in Women's Singles, Women's Doubles and the Women's Team event at the 2019 Pan American Games in Lima, Peru. In Women's Singles, Longoria defeated Argentine Natalia Mendez, 15–10, 15–10, in the semi-finals, and Mendez's teammate Maria Jose Vargas in the final, 15–7, 15–9. She played Women's Doubles with Samantha Salas, and they beat Americans Kelani Lawrence and Rhonda Rajsich in the semi-finals, 15–6, 15–1, and then defeated Guatemalans Gabriela Martinez and Maria Renee Rodriguez in the final, 15–5, 11–15, 11–5. In the Women's Team event, Longoria and her teammates Salas and Montserrat Mejia defeated the US in the semi-finals, 2–0, and Argentina in the final, 2–0.

Her accomplishments at the 2019 Pan American Games led the World Games organization to name Longoria its Athlete of the Month for August 2019.

Longoria won a 10th US Open in 2019. She defeated Montserrat Mejia, 15–5, 15–6, in the semi-finals, and Maria Jose Vargas in the final, 15–5, 15–7. However, Longoria lost in the US Open doubles final, as she and Samantha Salas were beaten by Alexandra Herrera and Mejia in the final, 15–13, 15–12. It was the first time Longoria hadn't won LPRT doubles at the US Open in the six years that it had been played.

Over the 2019–20 and COVID-shortened 2020-21 LPRT seasons, Longoria won 9 of the 11 tournaments, finishing #1 both seasons. Her only losses were to Maria Jose Vargas in Chesapeake, Virginia in September 2019, and in Kansas to Monserrat Mejia in June 2021.

She won her 11th US Open in 2021. Longoria defeated Erika Manilla, 15–13, 15–10, in the semi-finals, and Maria Jose Vargas in the final, 15–3, 15–8. She also won doubles at the US Open with Samantha Salas, as they came back from a game down to defeat Alexandra Herrera and Montserrat Mejia in the final, 3–15, 15–11, 11–6.

Longoria regained both the Women's Singles and Women's Doubles World Championships by winning both divisions at the 2021 International Racquetball Federation (IRF) World Championships in Guatemala City. In singles, she defeated team-mate Samantha Salas in the quarterfinals, 15–13, 15–5, Argentina's Natalia Mendez, 15–10, 15–1, in the semi-finals, and American Kelani Lawrence, 15–6, 15–1, in the final. Longoria and Salas teamed up for doubles, and they beat Guatemalans Gabriela Martinez and Maria Renee Rodriguez, 15–9, 15–4, in the semi-finals, and Americans Erika Manilla and Rhonda Rajsich, 15–14, 15–6, in the final.

The 2021 titles make Longoria the winningest player in IRF World Championships history, and she is the only woman to have won both singles and doubles at Worlds.

Her winning performance at the 2021 World Championships qualified Longoria for the 2022 World Games in Birmingham, Alabama, where she won gold in women's singles. Longoria beat Carla Muñoz of Chile, 15–11, 15–5, 15–4, in the quarterfinals, Bolivian Angélica Barrios in the semi-finals, 15–12, 15–12, 15–9, and Guatemalan Gabriela Martinez in the final, 15–2, 9–15, 15–8, 15–9. The win is Longoria's 3rd World Games gold medal, making her the winningest racquetball player in World Games history.

Longoria won gold in Women's Singles, Women's Doubles and the Women's Team event at the 2022 IRF World Championships. In singles, she beat Gabriela Martinez of Guatemala in the final, 12–10, 11–7, 11–7. In doubles, she and Samantha Salas needed five games and extra points in the fifth game to defeat Argentina's Valeria Centellas and Natalia Mendez, 11–6, 15–17, 11–9, 9–11, 12–10. In the Women's Team event, Longoria helped Mexico defeat Bolivia in the final, 2–1. She's now won 10 gold medals at Worlds - 5 in Women's Singles and 5 in Women's Doubles (all with Salas) - which extends her lead as the winningest player in IRF World Championship history.

Longoria won three LPRT events in the 2022–23 season. which was her fewest wins on tour since she won her first tournament in the 2007–08 season (except for the COVID shortened 2020–21 season, when she won two of the three events). As a result, Longoria finished 2nd in the season ending rankings, behind Montserrat Mejia. It was the first time she hadn't been #1 at season's end since the 2010–11 season.

== Other honors ==
Longoria received the 2010 National Sports Award from the Mexican government. President Felipe Calderón presented Longoria with the award.

In 2013, Forbes Magazine's Mexico edition named Longoria as one of the 50 most influential women in Mexico.

Longoria was Mexico's flagbearer during the 2015 Pan American Games opening ceremony.

In 2021, Mattel announced that Longoria would be one of three new Barbie dolls launched as a tribute to Latin American athletes.

== Career summary ==
Longoria is the winningest player in both women's pro racquetball history and international competition. She has over 100 wins on the pro tour, highlighted by a record 12 victories at the US Open Racquetball Championships, racquetball's most prestigious pro event. Internationally, she won five IRF World Championships in both Women's Singles and Doubles, as well as nine gold medals at the Pan American Games and three gold medals at the World Games.

=== Career record ===
This table lists Longoria's results across annual events.

Event	2003	2004	2005	2006	2007	2008	2009	2010	2011	2012	2013	2014	2015	2016	2017	2018	2019	2020	2021	2022	2023	2024	2025
US Open - Singles	128	QF	32	16	QF	W	F	F	W	W	W	W	W	W	W	W	W	P	W	W	-	-	-
US Open - Doubles												W	W	W	W	W	F	P	W	F	-	-	-
LPRT Rank			15	27	12	6	1	1	2	1	1	1	1	1	1	1	1	1	1	1	2	2	1

Note: W = winner, F = finalist, SF = semi-finalist, QF = quarterfinalist, 16 = Round of 16, 32 = Round of 32, 64 = Round of 64, 128 = Round of 128. P = Cancelled due to COVID pandemic.

== See also ==
- List of racquetball players

Sporting positions
Preceded by Rhonda Rajsich; Rhonda Rajsich; Maria Jose Vargas	#1 Women's Pro Racquetball Player; 2008–2010; 2011–2022; 2024-25	Succeeded by Rhonda Rajsich; Montserrat Mejia; Current
