= Carla Muñoz =

Chilean racquetball player

Personal information
- Born: February 12, 1992 (age 34) Concepción, Chile
- Home town: Santiago, Chile

Sport
- Sport: Racquetball
Medal record
Women's Racquetball
Representing Chile
Pan American Games
Bronze medal – third place	2011 Guadalajara	Doubles
World Championships
Bronze medal – third place	2024 San Antonio	Singles
Bronze medal – third place	2014 Burlington	Doubles
Silver medal – second place	2012 Santo Domingo	Doubles
Pan Am Championships
Gold medal – first place	2025 Guatemala City	Mixed Doubles
Silver medal – second place	2024 Guatemala City	Singles
Bronze medal – third place	2024 Guatemala City	Doubles
Bronze medal – third place	2024 Guatemala City	Team
Bronze medal – third place	2022 Santa Cruz	Singles
Bronze medal – third place	2022 Santa Cruz	Singles
Bronze medal – third place	2018 Temuco	Doubles
Bronze medal – third place	2013 Cali	Doubles
South American Games
Bronze medal – third place	2018 Cochabamba	Singles
Bolivarian Games
Bronze medal – third place	2017 Santa Marta	Singles
Bronze medal – third place	2013 Trujillo	Doubles
USA Racquetball National Intercollegiate Championships
Gold medal – first place	2016	Singles
Gold medal – first place	2017	Singles
Silver medal – second place	2017	Doubles
Gold medal – first place	2018	Singles
Bronze medal – third place	2018	Doubles
Silver medal – second place	2019	Singles

Carla Muñoz Montesinos (born February 12, 1992) is a Chilean professional racquetball player. She has won multiple medals, including the three consecutive gold medals in the USA Racquetball National Intercollegiate Championships in 2016, 2017, and 2018. In 2014, Munoz was awarded Best Racquetball Player of the Year by the Chilean Journalist Association. She plays on the Ladies Professional Racquetball Tour and has been ranked as high as 8th.

== Early life ==
Muñoz was born in Concepción, Chile, the daughter of Glenda Montesinos and Fernando Muñoz. She was raised in the capital city of Santiago along with two sisters and one brother, and was the youngest child. In Santiago, she attended De La Salle School, competing in numerous sports, and studied Flamenco dancing for 8 years.

At the age of 14, Muñoz began playing racquetball after being fascinated by her own father playing the sport, who later taught her the game. After just a few months of playing, she began winning tournaments in the girls' division, then later started to compete with and win against boys her age. At the age of 17, she enrolled in Adolfo Ibáñez University, studying business & engineering, and quit racquetball for nearly two years to focus on her studies. She returned to the sport to compete in the 2011 Pan American Games in Guadalajara, Mexico, where she took home the bronze medal with her doubles partner Angela Grisar. It was then where Muñoz decided that she wanted to become a professional racquetball player. She began traveling to the United States to play in more tournaments and train, knowing it would be difficult due to having no junior career and very little experience in high-level competition.

In 2014, Muñoz moved to the United States, settling in the San Francisco Bay Area to receive more training and play in more tournaments, while also furthering her educational aspirations of becoming an accountant.

In 2016, Muñoz received a two-year scholarship to attend Colorado State University Pueblo to finish her degree in Business and Accounting, and to play for their nationally-ranked racquetball program. In 2017, Carla represented CSU Pueblo at the National Intercollegiate Championships, winning the gold medal in Singles, and the silver medal in Doubles.

== Professional career ==
Muñoz currently plays for the Ladies Professional Racquetball Tour, and has been ranked in the top 10 at the end of three seasons (2016-17, 2017-18, 2022-23).

== International career ==
Muñoz has played for Chile in numerous international competition winning several medals, including at the World Championships and the Pan American Games. In 2011, she won the bronze medal in doubles at the Pan American Games. She took home the silver medal in doubles at the World Racquetball Championship in 2012. The 2013 Pan American Racquetball Championship saw her winning the Bronze medal in doubles. Munoz won another Bronze medal in doubles the next year at the 2014 World Racquetball Championship and became ranked #13 in singles.

Muñoz earned a bronze medal in Women's Singles at the 2022 Pan American Racquetball Championships. She defeated American Rhonda Rajsich in the quarterfinals, 15-13, 10-15, 15-11, 15-13, but then lost in the semi-finals to Argentina's Maria Jose Vargas, 11-15, 15-11, 15-7, 15-13. In Women’s Doubles, Muñoz and Paula Mansilla lost in the quarterfinals to Bolivians Micaela Meneses and Yazmine Sabja, 15-9, 15-5, 15-11. In Mixed Doubles, she and Rodrigo Salgado Jr. lost in the quarterfinals to Argentines Valeria Centellas and Diego Garcia, 15-5, 15-6, 15-12.

Playing at the 2024 Pan American Racquetball Championships in Guatemala City, Muñoz won three medals: a silver and two bronze. She was runner up in Women's Singles, losing in the final to Argentina's Maria Jose Vargas, after beating Vargas's team-mate Natalia Mendez in the semi-finals, and American Michelle Key in the quarterfinals. Muñoz got bronze in both Women's Doubles with Paula Mansilla and the Women's Team event with Mansilla.

Muñoz and Alan Natera won gold in Mixed Doubles at the 2025 Pan American Racquetball Championships in Guatemala City. They defeated Guatemalans Edwin Galicia and Gabriela Martinez in the final, 11-6, 6-11, 11-9, 9-11, 11-9.

== Other honors ==
- Highest LPRT ranking: #8
- Muñoz received the 2014 Best Racquetball Player of the Year award from the Chilean Journalist Association.

== See also ==
- List of racquetball players

== Sponsors ==
- Racquetball World
- Reaching Your Dream Foundation
- Gearbox Racquetball
- Chilean Olympic Committee
