= 2022 Racquetball World Championships – Women's doubles =

Women's doubles at the XXI Racquetball World Championships
- Location: San Luis Potosi, Mexico
- Dates: August 20–27

Medalists
gold medal	(Mexico) Paola Longoria & Samantha Salas
silver medal	(Argentina) Valeria Centellas & Natalia Mendez
bronze medal	(Guatemala) Gabriela Martinez & Maria Renee Rodriguez (Canada) Frédérique Lambert & Michèle Morissette

The International Racquetball Federation's 21st Racquetball World Championships were held in San Luis Potosi, Mexico from August 20–27, 2022. This was the first time that Worlds was held in Mexico since 2000, when it was also held in San Luis Potosi.

The 2022 World Championships used a best-of-five games match format with each game played to 11 points, win by 2, with rally scoring, as used in other sports like squash and volleyball. Previously, racquetball games used side-out scoring, where players scored points only when they had won a rally which began with that player serving. Rallies won when not serving were simply side-outs: the rally losing player lost the serve and the rally winning player won the opportunity to serve, but did not win a point.

In 2022, Mexicans Paola Longoria and Samantha Salas won women's doubles for a record-extending fifth time, but they needed five games and extra points in the fifth game to defeat the Argentina team of Valeria Centellas and Natalia Mendez in the final, winning 11–6, 15–17, 11–9, 9–11, 12–10.

== Tournament format ==
The 2022 World Championships used a two-stage format to determine the World Champions. Initially, players competed in separate groups over three days. The results were used to seed teams for the medal round.

== Women's doubles ==
=== Preliminary round ===
Group 1

Players	Pld	W	L	GW	GL	PW	PL	Place
(Mexico) Paola Longoria & Samantha Salas	2	2	0	6	0	66	30	1
(Colombia) Cristina Amaya & Maria Paz Riquelme	2	1	1	3	5	72	80	2
(Ecuador) Maria Jose Muñoz & Ana Lucia Sarmiento	3	0	2	2	6	60	88	3

Group 2

Players	Pld	W	L	GW	GL	PW	PL	Place
(Canada) Frédérique Lambert & Michèle Morissette	3	2	1	7	3	97	59	1
(Argentina) Valeria Centellas & Natalia Méndez	3	2	1	7	4	103	70	2
(Bolivia) Angélica Barrios & Jenny Daza	3	2	1	6	5	101	89	3
(Cuba) Yurisleidis Araujo & Maria Regla	3	0	3	1	9	25	108	3

Group 3

Players	Pld	W	L	GW	GL	PW	PL	Place
(United States) Kelani Lawrence & Holly Scott	3	3	0	9	1	106	94	1
(Guatemala) Gabriela Martinez & Maria Renee Rodriguez	3	2	1	7	4	110	85	2
(Chile) Paula Mansilla & Carla Muñoz	3	1	2	4	6	93	108	3
(Japan) Maiko Sato & Naomi Wakimoto	3	0	3	0	9	62	104	4

=== Medal round ===
Round of 16
9	(Chile) Paula Mansilla & Carla Muñoz	6	3	8
8	(Bolivia) Angélica Barrios & Jenny Daza	11	11	11
11	(Cuba) Yurisleidis Araujo & Maria Regla	0	0	0
6	(Argentina) Valeria Centellas & Natalia Méndez	11	11	11
7	(Ecuador) Maria Jose Muñoz & Ana Lucia Sarmiento	11	11	7	11
10	(Japan) Maiko Sato & Naomi Wakimoto	6	7	11	6

Quarterfinals
1	(Mexico) Paola Longoria & Samantha Salas	11	11	11
8	(Bolivia) Angélica Barrios & Jenny Daza	5	4	4
5	(Colombia) Cristina Amaya & Maria Paz Riquelme	2	11	10
4	(Guatemala) Gabriela Martinez & Maria Renee Rodriguez	11	13	12
3	(United States) Kelani Lawrence & Holly Scott	11	9	18	4
6	(Argentina) Valeria Centellas & Natalia Méndez	8	11	20	11
7	(Ecuador) Maria Jose Muñoz & Ana Lucia Sarmiento	5	6	11	11
2	(Canada) Frédérique Lambert & Michèle Morissette	11	11	5	13

Semifinals
1	Mexico	11	12	11
4	Guatemala	4	10	9
6	Argentina	11	11	11
2	Canada	6	4	2

Final
1	Mexico	11	15	11	9	12
6	Argentina	6	17	9	11	10
