= Frédérique Lambert =

Canadian racquetball player

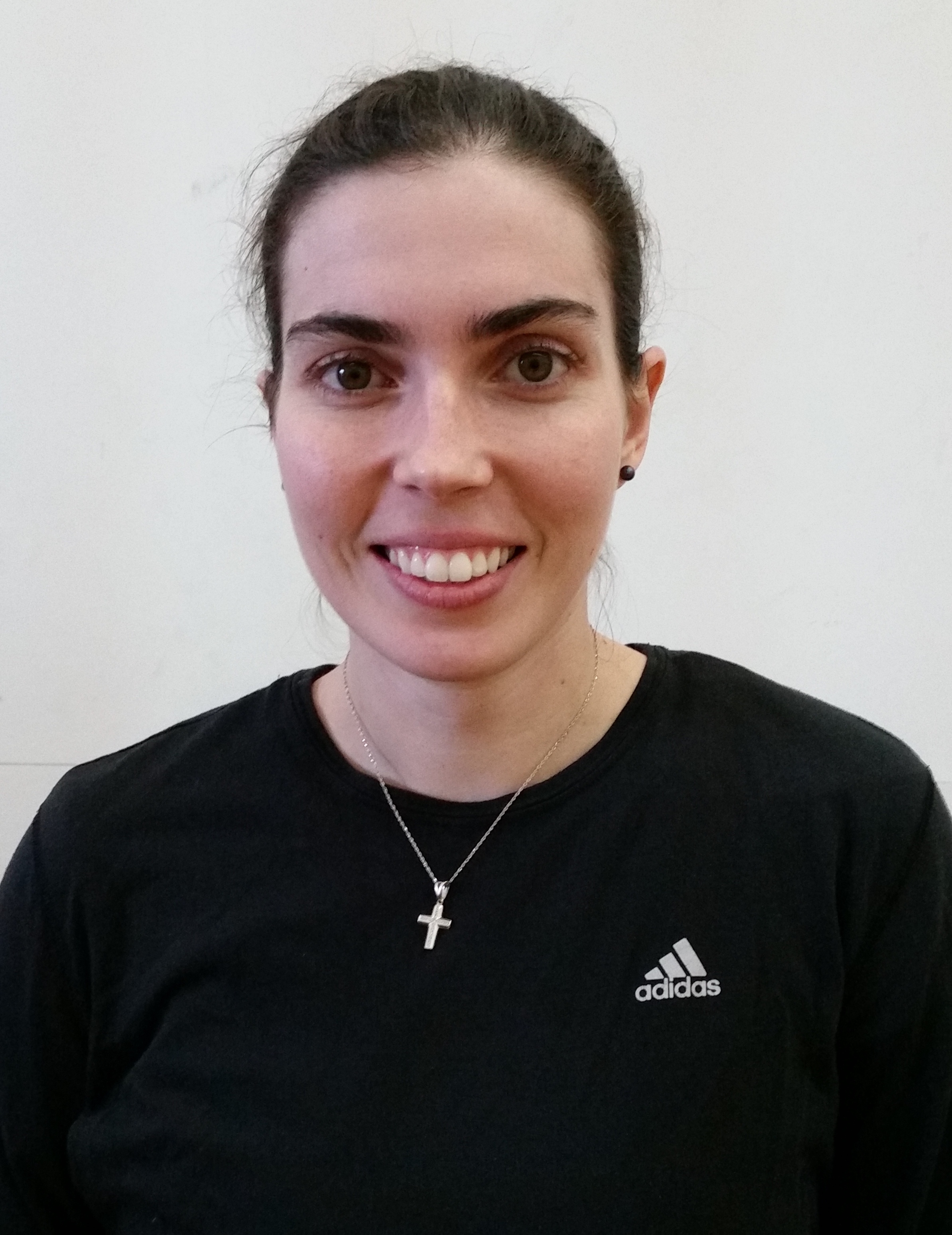
- Lambert in 2015

Personal information
- Full name: Frédérique T. Lambert
- Nickname: Fred
- Born: March 27, 1992 (age 34) Montreal, Quebec, Canada
- Height: 165 cm (5 ft 5 in)
- Weight: 63 kg (139 lb)

Sport
- Country: Canada
- Sport: Racquetball
- Coached by: Michel Gagnon

Achievements and titles
- National finals: 7 Singles (2015, 2017, 2021, 2022, 2023, 2024, 2025), 6 Doubles (2010, 2018, 2022, 2023, 2024, 2025)
- Highest world ranking: 2nd (2017 & 2018)
Medal record
Women's Racquetball
Representing Canada
World Championships
Bronze medal – third place	2010 Seoul	Doubles
Silver medal – second place	2010 Seoul	Team
Bronze medal – third place	2012 Santo Domingo	Doubles
Bronze medal – third place	2012 Santo Domingo	Team
Bronze medal – third place	2016 Cali	Doubles
Silver medal – second place	2022 San Luis Potosi	Mixed
Bronze medal – third place	2022 San Luis Potosi	Doubles
Bronze medal – third place	2024 San Antonio	Doubles
World Games
Bronze medal – third place	2025 Chengdu	Mixed Doubles
Pan American Championships
Bronze medal – third place	2008 San Jose	Doubles
Bronze medal – third place	2009 Cali	Singles
Bronze medal – third place	2010 San Pedro Sula	Doubles
Silver medal – second place	2012 Temuco	Singles
Silver medal – second place	2016 San Luis Potosi	Singles
Bronze medal – third place	2016 San Luis Potosi	Doubles
Bronze medal – third place	2025 Guatemala City	Team
Pan American Games
Bronze medal – third place	2015 Toronto	Team

Frédérique T. Lambert (born March 27, 1992) is a Canadian racquetball player. Lambert is the current Canadian Champion in Women's Singles and Women's Doubles, and has won 13 Canadian Championships: seven in Women's Singles and six in Women's Doubles. She has been a member of the Canadian National Team since 2008, and has won several medals in international competitions, including a silver medal in Mixed Doubles at the 2022 World Championships. Lambert was the #2 ranked player in back to back Ladies Professional Racquetball Tour (LPRT) seasons: 2016-17 and 2017–18.

== Junior career - 2005-2011 ==
Lambert was the International Racquetball Federation (IRF) World Junior Champion in Girl's U14 in 2007, and also got silver in Girl's U14 Doubles that year. In 2009, she was a bronze medalist in U16 singles, and in 2010 a silver medalist in U18. Then Lambert was the World Junior Champion in Girl's U18 in 2011, when she defeated Bolivian Maria Jose Vargas in the final, 4–15, 15–7, 11–4.

She was a Canadian Junior Champion 11 times. Lambert won 3 titles in each of Girl's U14, U16 and U18 between 2005 and 2011, as well as 2 doubles titles in Girls U18: in 2011 with Michèle Morissette and in 2008 with Brigitte Richard.

Lambert played at the Canadian National Championships in 2007 in Regina, Saskatchewan, losing in the quarterfinals to Jennifer Saunders, and finishing 3rd in doubles with Denise Haynes, as they lost to Josée Grand'Maître and Saunders in the semi-finals, but beating Brandi Jacobson Prentice and Alison Schlichemeyer in the 3rd place match. In the 2008 Canadian Championships in Burlington, Ontario, she lost in the semi-finals to Christie Van Hees, 15–1, 15–2, and again played doubles with Haynes, losing the semi-finals to Geneviève Brodeur and Véronique Guillemette, 12–15, 15–12, 12–10.

== Senior career begins - 2008-2013 ==
Lambert was still a junior age player when she made her first appearance on the Canadian National Team at the 2008 Pan Am Championships in San José, Costa Rica, where she was a bronze medalist in doubles with Josée Grand'Maître, losing in the semi-finals to Chileans Angela Grisar and Fabiola Marquez, 15–8, 15–12.

Lambert was a bronze medalist in Women's Singles at the 2009 Pan American Championships in Cali, Colombia, when she lost to Bolivian Carola Loma, 15–3, 15–14.

At the 2009 Canadian National Racquetball Championships, Lambert defeated Josée Grand'Maître, 15–10, 13–15, 11–7, in the semi-finals of Women's Singles, but lost the final to Jennifer Saunders, 15–10, 15–8. In Women's Doubles that year, she played with Denise Haynes, and they finished last in a five team round robin event.

Lambert played Women's Doubles with Geneviève Brodeur at the 2010 Pan American Racquetball Championships in San Pedro Sula, Honduras, where they lost to Mexicans Samantha Salas and Susana Acosta in final, 15–11, 15–4, after defeating the Dominican Republic's Claudine Garcia and Yira Portes, 15–2, 15–4.

Lambert's first Canadian Championship came 2010, when she won Women's Doubles with Brandi Jacobson Prentice. That year, she finished 3rd in singles, as she lost to Jennifer Saunders, 15–2, 15–10, in the semi-finals, but beat Jacobson Prentice in the 3rd place match, 8–15, 15–6, 11–4.

Lambert played Women's Doubles with Brandi Jacobson Prentice at the 2010 World Championships in Seoul, South Korea, and they lost in the semi-finals to Mexicans Paola Longoria and Samantha Salas, 15–8, 15–6. Lambert helped Canada get to the finals of the Women's Team event, so she was a double medalist at Worlds: bronze in doubles and silver in the team event.

Lambert was a runner up in Women's Singles at the 2011 Canadian Championships in Nova Scotia, where she lost to Jennifer Saunders, 15–11, 15–7, in the final, after defeating Josée Grand'Maître, 4–15, 17–15, 11–6, in the semi-finals. In doubles, she and Brandi Jacobson Prentice finished 2nd to Grand'Maître and Saunders in a four team round robin.

Lambert played in the 2011 Pan American Games in Guadalajara, Mexico, where she played Women's Singles, losing to Bolivian Maria Jose Vargas in the second round, 15–11, 15–8. In the Women's Team event, Canada lost to Ecuador in the quarterfinals.

At the 2012 Pan American Championships in Temuco, Chile, Lambert reached the final in Women's Singles by defeating Mexican Susana Acosta in the quarterfinals, 12–15, 15–6, 11–8, and American Rhonda Rajsich in the semi-finals, 15–13, 15–10, but lost the final after withdrawing midway through the first game against Mexican Paola Longoria due to injury.

Lambert was 2nd in Women's Singles at the 2012 Canadian Championships in Brossard, Quebec, where she lost to Jennifer Saunders in the final, 11–15, 15–1, 11–6. She was also 2nd in doubles with Brandi Jacobson Prentice, as they lost the final to Josée Grand'Maître and Saunders, 16–14, 15–10.

Lambert earned two bronze medals at the 2012 World Championships in Santo Domingo, Dominican Republic. She was a bronze medalist in women's doubles with Josée Grand'Maître, and in the women's team event also.

Lambert only played doubles (with Michèle Morissette) at the 2013 Canadian Championships in Langley, British Columbia, and they were 2nd to Josée Grand'Maître and Jennifer Saunders.

== Playing the pro tour - 2013-2019 ==
She began to play the Ladies Professional Racquetball Tour (LPRT) full time in the 2013–14 season, and she finished that season in the top 10 at #6. Lambert is the fifth Canadian to be ranked in the women's pro top 10 following Christie Van Hees, Jennifer Saunders, Lori-Jane Powell, and Heather Stupp. Lambert had played some pro tour events prior to 2013–14, but never more than a few, and didn't make it past the Round of 16.

Lambert's first LPRT semi-final on the Ladies Professional Racquetball Tour was in September 2013 at the Abierto Mexicano de Racquetas tournament in Toluca, Mexico. Lambert upset 2nd seed Rhonda Rajsich in the Round of 16, then defeated Maria Paz Muñoz in the quarter-finals before losing to Cristina Amaya in the semi-finals in four games, 11–9, 6–11, 11–0, 11–5.

Lambert became the #1 women's player in Canada in January 2014 after defeating Jennifer Saunders in two consecutive tournaments.

Lambert's first LPRT final appearance was at the 2014 New Jersey Open, when she was runner-up to Paola Longoria, who defeated Lambert in the final, 11–6, 11–4, 11–5. To reach the final, Lambert defeated Maria Jose Vargas in the semi-finals and Rhonda Rajsich in the quarterfinals.

Her first Canadian Championship in Women's Singles came in 2015, when she also defeated Saunders in the final, 15–7, 15–7.

Canada hosted the 2015 Pan American Games in Toronto, so Lambert played on home soil. In Women's Singles, she lost to American Rhonda Rajsich, 15–9, 9–15, 11–7, in the quarterfinals. But in the Women's Team event, Lambert and Jennifer Saunders defeated Argentina, 2–0, in the quarterfinals, and then lost to the US, 2–0, in the semi-finals, resulting in bronze medals.

At the 2016 Pan American Championships, Lambert reached the final of Women's Singles, but lost to Mexican Paola Longoria, 15–3, 15–6. In Women's Doubles, Lambert and Jennifer Saunders lost to Mexicans Longoria and Samantha Salas, 15–5, 15–8.

In August 2016, Lambert became the second Canadian to win a women's professional event after Christie Van Hees, as she won the Atlanta Championships in Lilburn, Georgia. In that tournament, Lambert defeated Alexandra Herrera in the final, 11–6, 11–3, 11–9, Jessica Parrilla in the semi-finals, 7–11, 11–3, 11–7, 11–5, and Cristina Amaya in the quarterfinals, 13–11, 9–11, 6–11, 11–2, 11–3.

That win helped Lambert finish the 2016-17 LPRT season as the #2 ranked player, a career high. It was her fourth consecutive top 10 finish. Her 2nd-place ranking is the second highest ranking by a Canadian behind only Van Hees, who was #1 in 2004–05.

Lambert won Women's Singles at the 2017 Canadian Championships in Brossard, Québec, where she defeated Jennifer Saunders in the final, 15–7, 15–8.

Lambert reached the finals of the 2017 US Open Racquetball Championships. She defeated Cristina Amaya, 11–3, 11–2, 11–5, in the quarterfinals, and Natalia Mendez, 11–8, 2–11, 11–2, 7–11, 11–8, in the semi-finals, but lost in the final to Paola Longoria, 11–7, 11–4, 2–11, 11–3. That was a career best at the US Open, and helped Lambert finish #2 on the LPRT for a second consecutive season.

In 2018, Lambert won Women's Doubles at the Canadian Championships in Winnipeg, Manitoba, where she and Jennifer Saunders came out on top of a four team round robin.

== Continuing to play for Canada - 2021-present ==
At the 2021 Canadian Championships in Brossard, Quebec, Lambert won Women's Singles by defeating Christine Keay in the final, 15–13, 15–2. In Women's Doubles, Lambert played with Michèle Morissette, and they lost in the semi-finals to Juliette Parent and Marjolaine Parent, 9–15, 17–15, 15–8.

Lambert played Women's Doubles at the 2021 World Championships with Alexis Iwaasa, and they lost in the Round of 16 to Argentina's Natalia Mendez and Valeria Centellas, 15–3, 15–4.

Lambert won both singles and doubles at the 2022 Canadian Championships in Brossard, Quebec. In Women's Singles, she defeated Michèle Morissette, 15–8, 15–9, 15–5, in the final. Lambert and Morissette teamed up for doubles, and went undefeated in a five team round robin to take the title.

At the 2022 Racquetball World Championships in San Luis Potosí, Mexico, Lambert played Women's Doubles with Michèle Morissette, and they reached the semi-finals, but then lost to Argentina's Natalia Mendez and Valeria Centellas, 11–6, 11–4, 11–2. She also played Mixed Doubles with Samuel Murray, and they beat Americans Michelle Key and Alejandro Landa in the quarterfinals, 8–11, 11–7, 12–10, 10–12, 11–5, and Bolivians Jenny Daza and Conrrado Moscoso, 11–9, 11–9, 12–10, in the semi-finals, but then lost in the final to Mexicans Rodrigo Montoya and Samantha Salas, 11–3, 9–11, 11–8, 11–9.

At the 2023 Canadian Championships in Winnipeg, Manitoba, Lambert won Women's Singles by defeating Juliette Parent in the final, 11–2, 11–7, 10–12, 11–4. She also won Women's Doubles with Michèle Morissette, as they came out on top of a five team round robin event. The titles were her 5th in singles and 4th in doubles.

She played at the 2023 Pan American Games in Santiago, Chile. There Lambert lost in the Round of 16 of Women's Singles to Argentina's Natalia Mendez, 11–9, 11–7, 9–11, 11–7. She played doubles with Michèle Morissette, and they lost to Mexicans Alexandra Herrera and Montserrat Mejia in the quarterfinals, 11–3, 11–7, 11–7. They also lost to Mexico in the quarters of the Women's Team event. Lambert played Mixed Doubles with Samuel Murray, and the lost in the quarterfinals to Bolivians Conrrado Moscoso and Angélica Barrios.

Lambert and Juliette Parent played doubles at the 2024 World Championships in San Antonio, Texas, where they reached the semi-finals with a win over Bolivians Angélica Barrios and Jenny Daza, 11-7, 15-13, 11-9, but lost in the semis to Argentina's Natalia Mendez and Maria Jose Vargas, 11-6, 11-4, 11-2. In Mixed Doubles, Lambert played with Samuel Murray, and they lost in the quarterfinals to Guatemalans Edwin Galicia and Gabriela Martinez, 13-11, 11-8, 1-11, 9-11, 15-13.

Lambert won both singles and doubles (with Michèle Morissette) at the 2025 Racquetball Canada National Championships in Burlington, Ontario. She defeated Juliette Parent, 13–11, 11–7, 11–4, in the singles final, and Lambert and Morissette went undefeated through a four team round robin. These were Lambert's 7th singles title and 6th doubles title.

Her Nationals results earned Lambert entry to the 2025 World Games in Chengdu, China, where she played singles and mixed doubles with Coby Iwaasa. The pair reached the semi-finals, losing to the USA's Jake Bredenbeck and Naomi Ros, 9–11, 11–5, 8–11, 11–9, 11–9, but won the bronze medal match against Japan's Michimune Kono and Harumi Kajino, 11–3, 11–7, 7–11, 11–4.

== Personal life ==
Lambert lives in Montreal, Quebec. A graduate of the Université de Montréal Faculty of Medicine, she works as an emergency room physician.

== Career summary ==
Lambert has won 5 Canadian Championships in singles, and 4 in doubles with three different partners: 2 with Michèle Morissette, and one each with Brandi Jacobson Prentice and Jennifer Saunders. She's also won several medals internationally as part of Team Canada, and was twice the #2 player on the Ladies Professional Racquetball Tour.

=== Career record ===
The following table lists Lambert's accomplishments across annual events.

Year	2007	2008	2009	2010	2011	2012	2013	2014	2015	2016	2017	2018	2019	2020	2021	2022	2023	2024	2025
Canadian Championships - Singles	QF	4th	F	3rd	F	F	-	F	W	-	W	-	-	P	W	W	W	W	W
Canadian Championships - Doubles	3rd	SF	5th	W	F	F	F	-	F	-	-	W	-	P	SF	W	W	W	W
LPRT Rank	42	24	31	31	28	32	6	4	4	2	2	9	24					28	
US Open	32	32	32	32	32		16	QF	QF	SF	F	SF	16						

Note: W = winner, F = finalist, SF = semi-finalist, QF = quarterfinalist, 16 = Round of 16, 32 = Round of 32. P = COVID-19 Pandemic interruption.

== See also ==
- List of racquetball players
