= 2025 Pan American Racquetball Championships =

The 2025 Pan American Racquetball Championships were held in Guatemala City, Guatemala, April 12–19. Mexican Montserrat Mejia won Women's Singles - her 2nd Pan Am title in singles - and Argentina's Natalia Mendez and Valeria Centellas won Women's Doubles, the third time Mendez has won that division at Pan Am Championships and the first for Centellas. Argentina’s Diego Garcia won Men’s Singles - a first for him and for Argentina, while Bolivians Kadim Carrasco and Conrrado Moscoso won Men’s Doubles - the first time for Carrasco, second time for Mosocoso and third time for Bolivia overall. Finally, in Mixed Doubles, Chileans Alan Natera and Carla Muñoz won, which was a first for them and for Chile. The men's and women's team competitions were won by Bolivia and Mexico, respectively.

== Tournament format ==
The competition had seven events: five individual events and two team events. The individual events were played first: Men's and Women's Singles and Doubles and Mixed Doubles. Each individual event had a group stage followed by a medal round. The results of the group stage were used to seed players for the medal round. The group stage began April 12 and concluded April 14. The medal round began April 15 and concluded April 17. The team events were held from April 17 to 19 with a best of three match format consisting of two singles matches and a doubles match with the order of the matches varying by round.

== Participating nations ==
A total of 56 athletes (34 men & 22 women) from 12 countries participated.

- Argentina (4)
- Bolivia (3)
- Canada (8)
- Chile (4)
- Costa Rica (5)
- Cuba (2)
- Dominican Republic (5)
- Ecuador (4)
- Guatemala (7)
- Mexico (7)
- Peru (2)
- United States (5)

== Medal summary ==
=== Medal table ===
Rank	Nation	Gold	Silver	Bronze	Total
1	Argentina (ARG)	2	3	1	6
2	Mexico (MEX)	2	2	3	7
3	Bolivia (BOL)	2	0	1	3
4	Chile (CHI)	1	0	0	1
5	United States (USA)	0	1	4	5
6	Guatemala (GUA)	0	1	0	1
7	Costa Rica (CRC)	0	0	3	3
8	Canada (CAN)	0	0	2	2
Totals (8 entries)		7	7	14	28

=== Medalists ===
Event	Gold	Silver	Bronze
Men's events
Singles	Diego García; Argentina	Javier Mar; Mexico	Conrrado Moscoso; Bolivia Samuel Murray; Canada
Doubles	Kadim Carrasco; Conrrado Moscoso; Bolivia	Diego García; Gerson Miranda Martinez; Argentina	Jake Bredenbeck; Sam Bredenbeck; United States Andrés Acuña; Gabriel Garcia; Costa Rica
Team	Kadim Carrasco; Carlos Keller; Conrrado Moscoso; Bolivia	Jake Bredenbeck; Sam Bredenbeck; Thomas Carter; United States	Sebastian Hernández; Javier Mar; Rodrigo Montoya; Erick Trujillo; Mexico Andrés Acuña; Felipe Camacho; Gabriel Garcia; Costa Rica
Women's events
Singles	Montserrat Mejia; Mexico	Natalia Mendez; Argentina	Lexi York; United States Alexandra Herrera; Mexico
Doubles	Natalia Mendez; Valeria Centellas; Argentina	Alexandra Herrera; Samantha Salas; Mexico	Michelle Key; Lexi York; United States Larissa Faeth; Jimena Gomez; Costa Rica
Team	Alexandra Herrera; Montserrat Mejia; Samantha Salas; Mexico	Valeria Centellas; Natalia Mendez; Argentina	Chloe Jauvin; Frédérique Lambert; Juliette Parent; Ofelia Wilscam; Canada Michelle Key; Lexi York; United States
Mixed events
Doubles	Carla Muñoz; Alan Natera; Chile	Edwin Galicia; Gabriela Martinez; Guatemala	Rodrigo Montoya; Samantha Salas; Mexico Natalia Mendez; Gerson Miranda Martinez; Argentina

== Men’s singles ==
=== Preliminary round ===
Group 1

Players	Pld	W	L	GW	GL	PW	PL	Place
(Mexico) Javier Mar	2	2	0	6	1	73	49	1
(Guatemala) Edwin Galicia	2	1	1	4	4	74	63	2
(Argentina) Gerson Miranda Martinez	2	0	2	1	6	40	75	3

Group 2

Players	Pld	W	L	GW	GL	PW	PL	Place
(Bolivia) Conrrado Moscoso	3	3	0	9	1	106	53	1
(Chile) Alan Natera	3	2	1	7	3	93	65	2
(Canada) Leyton Gouldie	3	1	2	3	6	63	73	3
(Peru) Erik Mendoza	3	0	3	0	9	28	99	4

Group 3

Players	Pld	W	L	GW	GL	PW	PL	Place
(Argentina) Diego Garcia	3	3	0	9	1	107	47	1
(Guatemala) Juan Slavatierra	3	2	1	6	3	94	67	2
(Mexico) Sebastian Hernández	3	1	2	3	6	78	87	3
(Peru) David Gonzalez	3	0	3	0	9	38	101	4

Group 4

Players	Pld	W	L	GW	GL	PW	PL	Place
(Canada) Samuel Murray	3	3	0	9	2	118	73	1
(Bolivia) Carlos Keller	3	2	1	6	3	85	54	2
(Chile) Rodrigo Salgado Jr.	3	1	2	5	6	89	103	3
(Cuba) Christhian Menendez	3	0	3	2	9	38	100	4

Group 5

Players	Pld	W	L	GW	GL	PW	PL	Place
(Costa Rica) Jake Bredenbeck	3	3	0	9	1	107	65	1
(Dominican Republic) Ramón de León	3	2	1	6	6	105	111	2
(Costa Rica) Felipe Camacho	3	1	2	5	6	96	100	3
(Ecuador) Jose Daniel Ugalde	3	0	3	2	9	80	112	4

Group 6

Players	Pld	W	L	GW	GL	PW	PL	Place
(Costa Rica) Andrés Acuña	3	3	0	9	0	101	55	1
(United States) Thomas Carter	3	2	1	6	3	93	65	2
(Ecuador) Juan Francisco Cueva	3	1	2	3	6	74	78	3
(Dominican Republic) Diego Pimentel	3	0	3	0	9	29	99	4

=== Medal round ===
First Round
9	(Guatemala) Juan Salvatierra	12	12	11
8	(Guatemala) Edwin Galicia	10	10	7
5	(Costa Rica) Andrés Acuña	11	11	11
12	(United States) Thomas Carter	8	7	8
11	(Dominican Republic) Ramón de León	5	5	4
6	(United States) Jake Bredenbeck	11	11	11
7	(Chile) Alan Natera	11	13	6	11	11
10	(Bolivia) Carlos Keller	6	15	11	6	13

Quarterfinals
1	(Mexico) Javier Mar	11	12	11
8	(Guatemala) Juan Salvatierra	3	10	4
5	(Costa Rica) Andrés Acuña	7	5	11	6
4	(Canada) Samuel Murray	11	11	6	11
3	(Argentina) Diego Garcia	11	7	11	11
6	(United States) Jake Bredenbeck	6	11	2	7
7	(Bolivia) Carlos Keller	7	11	3	6
2	(Bolivia) Conrrado Moscoso	11	7	11	11

Semifinals
1	(Mexico) Javier Mar	9	11	10	11	11
5	(Canada) Samuel Murray	11	9	12	3	4
3	(Argentina) Diego Garcia	11	5	11	6	11
2	(Bolivia) Conrrado Moscoso	8	11	8	11	8

Final
1	(Mexico) Javier Mar	7	8	8
3	(Argentina) Diego Garcia	11	11	11

== Men’s doubles ==
Group 1

Players	Pld	W	L	GW	GL	PW	PL	Place
(Costa Rica) Andrés Acuña & Gabriel Garcia	3	3	0	9	0	99	48	1
(Chile) Alan Natera & Rodrigo Salgado Jr.	3	2	1	6	3	90	66	2
(Guatemala) Jose Caceres & Juan Salvatierra	3	1	2	3	7	78	90	3
(Puerto Rico) David Gonzalez & Erik Mendoza	3	0	3	0	9	42	105	4

Group 2

Players	Pld	W	L	GW	GL	PW	PL	Place
(United States) Jake Bredenbeck & Sam Bredenbeck	3	3	0	9	3	118	93	1
(Mexico) Sebastian Hernández & Erick Trujillo	3	2	1	7	3	104	72	2
(Dominican Republic) Ramon de León & Ricardo Monroy	3	1	2	5	6	93	94	3
(Cuba) Raul Martinez Gutierrez & Christhian Menendez	3	0	3	0	9	44	100	4

Group 3

Players	Pld	W	L	GW	GL	PW	PL	Place
(Bolivia) Kadim Carrasco & Conrrado Moscoso	3	3	0	9	5	135	109	1
(Argentina) Diego Garcia & Gerson Miranda Martinez	3	2	1	7	3	102	82	2
(Ecuador) Juan Francisco Cueva & Jose Daniel Ugalde	3	1	2	5	8	110	130	3
(Canada) Kurtis Cullen & Trevor Webb	3	0	3	4	9	113	139	4

=== Medal Round ===
First Round
9	(Canada) Kurtis Cullen & Trevor Webb	9	11	9	16	10
8	(Guatemala) Jose Caceres & Juan Salvatierra	11	5	11	14	12
5	(Chile) Alan Natera & Rodrigo Salgado Jr.	11	11	11
12	(Cuba) Raul Martinez Gutierrez & Christhian Menendez	3	7	5
11	(Peru) David Gonzalez & Erik Mendoza	11	11	11
6	(Mexico) Sebastian Hernández & Erick Trujillo	3	4	6
7	(Dominican Republic) Ramón de León & Ricardo Monroy	8	11	11	10	5
10	(Ecuador) Juan Francisco Cueva & Jose Daniel Ugalde	11	8	8	12	11

Quarterfinals
1	(Costa Rica) Andrés Acuña & Gabriel Garcia	11	7	7	11	11
8	(Guatemala) Jose Caceres & Juan Salvatierra	9	11	11	6	4
5	(Chile) Alan Natera & Rodrigo Salgado Jr.	8	8	9
4	(Argentina) Diego Garcia & Gerson Miranda Martinez	11	11	11
3	(Bolivia) Kadim Carrasco & Conrrado Moscoso	11	11	11
6	(Mexico) Sebastian Hernández & Erick Trujillo	5	4	7
10	(Ecuador) Juan Francisco Cueva & Jose Daniel Ugalde	3	6	6
2	(United States) Jake Bredenbeck & Sam Bredenbeck	11	11	11

Semifinals
1	(Costa Rica) Andrés Acuña & Gabriel Garcia	11	11	4	11	5
4	(Argentina) Diego Garcia & Gerson Miranda Martinez	8	4	11	13	11
3	(Bolivia) Kadim Carrasco & Conrrado Moscoso	11	11	11
2	(United States) Jake Bredenbeck & Sam Bredenbeck	8	8	5

Final
4	(Argentina) Diego Garcia & Gerson Miranda Martinez	7	11	11	7
2	(Bolivia) Kadim Carrasco & Conrrado Moscoso	11	11	7	11

== Women’s singles ==
=== Preliminary round ===
Group 1

Players	Pld	W	L	GW	GL	PW	PL	Place
(Argentina) Natalia Mendez	2	2	0	6	1	74	43	1
(United States) Michelle Key	2	1	1	4	3	62	56	2
(Guatemala) Jamileth Sipac	2	0	2	0	6	91	81	3

Group 2

Players	Pld	W	L	GW	GL	PW	PL	Place
(United States) Lexi York	2	2	0	6	3	88	69	1
(Canada) Frédérique Lambert	2	1	1	5	4	82	73	2
(Guatemala) Maria Renee Rodriguez	2	0	2	2	6	52	80	3

Group 3

Players	Pld	W	L	GW	GL	PW	PL	Place
(Chile) Carla Muñoz	2	2	0	6	3	96	84	2
(Argentina) Valeria Centellas	2	1	1	5	3	82	65	1
(Dominican Republic) María Céspedes	2	0	2	1	6	47	76	3

Group 4

Players	Pld	W	L	GW	GL	PW	PL	Place
(Mexico) Alexandra Herrera	3	3	0	9	0	99	31	1
(Costa Rica) Larissa Faeth	3	1	2	5	6	97	95	3
(Canada) Juliette Parent	3	1	2	3	6	54	92	2
(Guatemala) Jazmin Aguilar	3	1	2	3	8	86	118	4

Group 5

Players	Pld	W	L	GW	GL	PW	PL	Place
(Mexico) Montserrat Mejia	3	3	0	9	0	105	13	1
(Costa Rica) Jimena Gomez	3	2	1	6	4	82	71	2
(Dominican Republic) Merynanyelly Delgado	3	1	2	3	6	35	102	3
(Chile) Paula Mansilla	3	0	3	1	9	71	107	4

=== Medal round ===
First Round
9	(Canada) Frédérique Lambert	11	11	11
8	(Costa Rica) Larissa Faeth	8	9	8
7	(Argentina) Valeria Centellas	8	6	8
10	(United States) Michelle Key	11	11	11

Quarterfinals
1	(Argentina) Natalia Mendez	11	11	11
8	(Canada) Frédérique Lambert	3	8	7
5	(Costa Rica) Jimena Gomez	3	1	0
4	(Mexico) Alexandra Herrera	11	11	11
3	(Chile) Carla Muñoz	8	9	4
6	(Mexico) Montserrat Mejia	11	11	11
10	(United States) Michelle Key	11	6	14	6	14
2	(United States) Lexi York	7	11	12	11	16

Semifinals
1	(Argentina) Natalia Mendez	11	10	11	11
4	(Mexico) Alexandra Herrera	8	12	7	8
6	(Mexico) Montserrat Mejia	11	11	9	11
2	(United States) Lexi York	4	7	11	6

Final
1	(Argentina) Natalia Mendez	4	10	8
6	(Mexico) Montserrat Mejia	11	12	11

== Women’s doubles ==
=== Preliminary round ===
Group 1

Players	Pld	W	L	GW	GL	PW	PL	Place
(Argentina) Natalia Méndez & María José Vargas	3	3	0	9	0	99	44	1
(Chile) Carla Muñoz & Paula Javiera Mansilla Cid	3	2	1	6	5	100	104	3
(Costa Rica) Larissa Faeth & Jimena Gomez	3	1	2	4	8	105	95	2
(Guatemala) Jamileth Sipac & Isabella Wer	3	0	3	3	9	97	119	4

Group 2

Players	Pld	W	L	GW	GL	PW	PL	Place
(Mexico) Alexandra Herrera & Samantha Salas	3	3	0	9	0	109	32	1
(United States) Michelle Key & Lexi York	3	2	1	6	4	96	68	2
(Canada) Chloe Jauvin & Ofelia Wilscam	3	1	2	3	6	69	66	3
(Dominican Republic) María Céspedes & Merynanyelly Delgado	3	0	3	1	9	18	126	4

=== Medal round ===
Quarterfinals
5	(Canada) Chloe Jauvin & Ofelia Wilscam	7	6	2
4	(United States) Michelle Key & Lexi York	11	11	11
3	(Chile) Carla Muñoz & Paula Javiera Mansilla Cid	13	8	6	3
6	(Costa Rica) Larissa Faeth & Jimena Gomez	11	11	11	11
7	(Guatemala) Jamileth Sipac & Isabella Wer	6	6	3
2	(Mexico) Alexandra Herrera & Samantha Salas	11	11	11

Semifinals
1	(Argentina) Valeria Centellas & Natalia Mendez	14	11	8	6	11
4	(United States) Michelle Key & Lexi York	12	7	11	11	4
3	(Guatemala) Jamileth Sipac & Isabella Wer	7	6	5
2	(Mexico) Alexandra Herrera & Samantha Salas	11	11	11

Final
1	(Argentina) Valeria Centellas & Natalia Mendez	11	12	11
2	(Mexico) Alexandra Herrera & Samantha Salas	4	10	8

== Mixed doubles ==
Group 1

Players	Pld	W	L	GW	GL	PW	PL	Place
(United States) Sam Bredenbeck & Michelle Key	2	2	0	6	1	72	54	1
(Guatemala) Edwin Galicia & Gabriela Martinez	2	1	1	4	4	82	69	2
(Dominican Republic) Ramón de León & Merynanyelly Delgado	2	0	2	1	6	46	77	3

Group 2

Players	Pld	W	L	GW	GL	PW	PL	Place
(Chile) Carla Muñoz & Alan Natera	2	2	0	6	0	67	39	1
(United States) Frédérique Lambert & Samuel Murray	2	1	1	3	4	69	63	2
(Ecuador) Martin Carchi & Maria Angela Villacreses	2	0	2	1	6	42	76	3

Group 3

Players	Pld	W	L	GW	GL	PW	PL	Place
(Mexico) Rodrigo Montoya & Samantha Salas	2	2	0	6	3	97	85	1
(Guatemala) Andrea Martinez & Juan Salvatierra	2	1	1	4	4	74	73	2
(Argentina) Gerson Miranda Martinez & Natalia Mendez	2	0	2	3	6	78	91	3

=== Medal Round ===
First Round
9	(Argentina) Natalia Mendez & Gerson Miranda Martinez	11	11	11
8	(Dominican Republic) Ramón de León & Merynanyelly Delgado	6	8	4

Quarterfinals
1	(United States) Sam Bredenbeck & Michelle Key	10	11	5	4
9	(Argentina) Natalia Mendez & Gerson Miranda Martinez	12	5	11	11
5	(Guatemala) Edwin Galicia & Gabriela Martinez	11	4	11	11
4	(Costa Rica) Andrés Acuña & Larissa Faeth	9	11	4	7
3	(Mexico) Rodrigo Montoya & Samantha Salas	11	11	11
6	(Canada) Frédérique Lambert & Samuel Murray	7	7	4
7	(Ecuador) Martin Carchi & Maria Angela Villacreses	forfeit
2	(Chile) Carla Muñoz & Alan Natera

Semifinals
9	(Argentina) Natalia Mendez & Gerson Miranda Martinez	9	10	9
5	(Guatemala) Edwin Galicia & Gabriela Martinez	11	12	11
3	(Mexico) Rodrigo Montoya & Samantha Salas	7	7	11	6
2	(Chile) Carla Muñoz & Alan Natera	11	11	3	11

Final
5	(Guatemala) Edwin Galicia & Gabriela Martinez	6	11	9	11	9
2	(Chile) Carla Muñoz & Alan Natera	11	6	11	9	11

== Team Competitions ==
=== Men’s Team ===
First Round
9	Dominican Republic
8	Canada
5	Mexico
12	Cuba
11	Peru
8	(Canada) Costa Rica
7	Chile
10	Ecuador

Quarterfinals
Bolivia	3	3
Canada	0	0
Mexico	3	3
Argentina	0	0
Guatemala	0	3	1
Costa Rica	3	0	3
Ecuador	0	0
(United States) USA	3	3

Semifinals
Bolivia	3	1	3
Mexico	0	3	0
Costa Rica	3	0	0
(United States) USA	0	3	3

Final
Bolivia	3	3	-
(United States) USA	0	0	-

Semi-finals

18 April 2025	BOL	2–1	Mexico

Carlos Keller	3–0	Javier Mar	11–7, 13-11, 11-8
Kadim Carrasco / Conrrado Moscoso	0–3	Javier Mar / Rodrigo Montoya	11-5, 11-8, 8-11, 11-4
Conrrado Moscoso	3–0	Rodrigo Montoya	11-5, 11-7, 11-8

18 April 2025	USA	2–1	Costa Rica

Thomas Carter	0–3	Andrés Acuña	11–6, 11-7, 11-9
Jake Bredenbeck / Sam Bredenbeck	3–0	Andrés Acuña / Gabriel Garcia	11-7, 11-7, 11-7
Jake Bredenbeck	3–0	Felipe Camacho	11-7, 11-6, 11-7

Final

19 April 2025	BOL	2–0	United States

Carlos Keller	3–0	Thomas Carter	11-9, 11-7, 11-4
Conrrado Moscoso	3–0	Jake Bredenbeck	13–11, 11–4, 11–9

=== Women’s Team ===
Quarterfinals
Canada	3	3
Costa Rica	2	1
Argentina	3	0	3
Chile	0	3	0
Guatemala	3	0	0
(United States) USA	0	3	3

Semifinals
Mexico	3	3
Canada	0	0
Argentina	3	3
(United States) USA	2	0

Final
Mexico	1	3	3
Argentina	3	0	2

Semi-finals

18 April 2025	MEX	2–0	Canada

Alexandra Herrera	3–0	Frédérique Lambert	12–10, 11-9, 12-10
Alexandra Herrera / Samantha Salas	3–0	Chloe Jauvin / Ofelia Wilscam	11–3, 11-3, 11–2

18 April 2025	ARG	2–0	United States

Valeria Centellas	3–2	Lexi York	7-11, 11–6, 12–10, 10-12, 11-9
Valeria Centellas / Natalia Mendez	3–0	Michelle Key / Lexi York	11-7, 13-11, 11-7

Final

19 April 2025	MEX	2–1	Argentina

Alexandra Herrera	1–3	Valeria Centellas	11–9, 12–10, 3-11, 11–8
Montserrat Mejia	3–0	Natalia Mendez	11–7, 11–2, 11–9
Alexandra Herrera / Samantha Salas	3–2	Valeria Centellas / Natalia Mendez	11-8, 11-9, 7-11, 2-11, 11-5
