= Natalia Méndez =

Argentine racquetball player

Natalia Mendez
Personal information
- Nationality: Argentine, Bolivian
- Born: January 28, 1997 (age 29) Bolivia

Sport
- Sport: Racquetball
Medal record
Women's Racquetball
Representing Argentina
Pan American Games
Silver medal – second place	2023 Santiago	Doubles
Silver medal – second place	2023 Santiago	Team
Bronze medal – third place	2019 Lima	Singles
Bronze medal – third place	2019 Lima	Doubles
Silver medal – second place	2019 Lima	Team
World Championships
Silver medal – second place	2024 San Antonio	Doubles
Silver medal – second place	2024 San Antonio	Team
Silver medal – second place	2022 San Luis Potosi	Doubles
Bronze medal – third place	2022 San Luis Potosi	Team
Bronze medal – third place	2021 Guatemala City	Singles
Bronze medal – third place	2021 Guatemala City	Doubles
Bronze medal – third place	2018 San José	Singles
Pan American Championships
Gold medal – first place	2026 Guatemala City	Team
Silver medal – second place	2026 Guatemala City	Mixed Doubles
Gold medal – first place	2025 Guatemala City	Doubles
Silver medal – second place	2025 Guatemala City	Singles
Bronze medal – third place	2025 Guatemala City	Mixed Doubles
Silver medal – second place	2025 Guatemala City	Team
Gold medal – first place	2024 Guatemala City	Doubles
Gold medal – first place	2024 Guatemala City	Team
Bronze medal – third place	2024 Guatemala City	Mixed Doubles
Bronze medal – third place	2023 Guatemala City	Singles
Bronze medal – third place	2023 Guatemala City	Doubles
Gold medal – first place	2022 Santa Cruz	Doubles
Bronze medal – third place	2019 Barranquilla	Singles
South American Games
Gold medal – first place	2018 Cochabamba	Doubles
Gold medal – first place	2018 Cochabamba	Team

Natalia Mendez (born January 28, 1997) is a Bolivian-born Argentine racquetball player. She is the current South American Champion in Women's Doubles and part of the Argentina team that won the Women's Team event at the 2026 Pan American Racquetball Championships. Mendez has also medaled at the International Racquetball Federation (IRF) World Championships as well as the Pan American Games.

== 2007-2015 - Junior years & Playing for Bolivia ==
Mendez competed at the International Racquetball Federation (IRF) Junior World Championships in 2007 in Cochabamba, Bolivia, where she won Girl’s U10, beating Mexican Karla Gascon, 15-4, 15-1, in the final. But she lost in the Girl’s U12 final at World Juniors in 2009 in Santo Domingo, Dominican Republic, to Mexican Diana Aguilar, 15-7, 15-13. However, in 2009, Mendez played Girls U14 Doubles with Masiel Rivera, and they were runners-up to the USA’s Kelani Bailey and Abbey Lavely, losing the final, 15-7, 15-10.

Mendez and Augilar also met in the Girl’s U12 final at World Juniors in 2010 in Los Angeles with the same result: a win for Aguilar, 15-5, 15-9. But she also play U14 Girls Singles in Los Angeles and she won, defeating Mexican Ximena Gonzalez in the final, 8-15, 15-12, 11-9.

Mendez reached the Girls U14 Singles final at the 2011 World Juniors in Santo Domingo, Dominican Republic, where she lost to Diana Aguilar of Mexico, 11-15, 15-10, 11-5, once again. She also played Girls U16 Singles, and lost to Venezuela’s Mariana Tobon in the Round of 16, 15-13, 13-15, 11-1.

The 2012 Girls U14 Singles final at Los Angeles was a rematch of 2011, and Aguilar again defeated Mendez, 14-15, 15-13, 11-3. But Mendez found success in the Girls U16 Singles that year, as she won that division by defeating Ximenez Gonzalez of Mexico in the final, 15-11, 15-12.

Mendez and Diana Aguilar of Mexico met once again in a final at World Juniors in 2013. This time it was Girls U16 Singles in Sucre, Bolivia, where Aguilar again got the best of Mendez, winning 15-13, 7-15, 11-2. Mendez was 2nd in Girls U16 Doubles also that year, playing with Iriana Avendaño.

Mendez played at the Pan American Championships for the first time in 2014 in Santa Cruz, Bolivia, representing her native land at home. In Santa Cruz, she played Women’s Singles, and lost to Canadian Frédérique Lambert, 15-8, 12-15, 11-1, in the Round of 16.

Mendez made her 1st appearance at the IRF World Championships at age 17, when she represented Bolivia at the 2014 World Championships in Burlington, Ontario. In Women’s Singles, Mendez lost in the Round of 32 to Sofia Soley of Costa Rica, 15-13, 15-13. But in Women’s Doubles with Adriana Riveros, they beat Soley and Melania Sauma (Costa Rica), 15-10, 15-7, in the Round of 16, but lost to two time defending champions Paola Longoria and Samantha Salas of Mexico, 15-5, 15-12, in the quarterfinals.

At the 2014 World Junior Championships in Cali, Colombia, Mendez lost in the quarterfinals of Girls U16 Singles to team-mate Hawira Rojas, 9-15, 15-7, 11-8. But Mendez did reach the semi-finals of Girls U18 Singles, losing to Mexico’s Alexandra Herrera, 15-6, 15-3.

Mendez won Girls U18 Singles in 2015 in Santo Domingo, Dominican Republic, where she defeated Dominican Maria Cespedes in the final, 15-9, 15-3. She played doubles with Wanda Carvajal that year, and they lost in the semi-finals to Costa Ricans Melania Sauma and Sofia Soley, 15-8, 7-15, 11-3.

Mendez attended her first Pan American Games in Toronto in 2015, when she played in Women’s Doubles and in the Women's Team event. In doubles, Mendez and Carola Loma defeated Gabriela Martinez and Maria Renee Rodriguez of Guatemala in the Round of 16, 10-15, 15-11, 11-5, but then lost to Mexicans Paola Longoria and Samantha Salas, 15-9, 15-0, in the quarterfinals. In the Women’s Team event Bolivia lost to Ecuador, 2-0, in the quarterfinals.

She began to play the Ladies Professional Racquetball Tour (LPRT) in 2016, and competed in 8 of the 12 events the 2016-17 season. She reached the quarterfinals three times, and finished the season ranked 12th.

== 2017 to present - Playing for Argentina and on the LPRT ==
When Mendez played at the Pan American Championships for a second time, she was representing Argentina in San José, Costa Rica in 2017. In Women’s Singles, she lost in the Round of 16 to Guatemalan Gabriela Martinez, 15-4, 15-2. In doubles, Mendez and Véronique Guillemette lost in the quarterfinals to Gabriela Martinez and Andrea Martinez (Guatemala), 15-6, 15-9.

Mendez got the semi-finals of the US Open Racquetball Championships in 2017, and was just a few points from the final, as she lost to Frédérique Lambert, 11-8, 2-11, 11-2, 7-11, 11-8. She also reached the semis at the Battle of the Alamo LPRT tournament in April 2018. These results helped her finish 7th at the end of the 2017-18 LPRT season.

Mendez played at the 2018 Pan American Championships in Temuco, Chile in March 2018. In Women’s Singles, she lost to the Gabriela Martinez in a tie-breaker, 15-12, 10-15, 11-2, in the quarterfinals. In Women's Doubles, Mendez partnered with Maria Jose Vargas, and they lost to Mexicans Paola Longoria and Alexandra Herrera, 15-14, 15-6., in the quarterfinals.

Mendez was a double gold medalist at the 2018 South American Games in Cochabamba, Bolivia. In Women’s Doubles, Mendez and Maria Jose Vargas beat Bolivians Stefanny Barrios and Jenny Daza, in the doubles final, 15-11, 15-10. They also defeated Bolivia in the Women's Team competition. In Women’s Singles, she lost to Colombian Cristina Amaya, 15-4, 15-4, in the quarterfinals.

At the 2018 World Championships in San José, Costa Rica, Mendez played both singles and doubles, as she represented Argentina for the first time. In Women's Singles, she beat Canadian Frédérique Lambert, 15-8, 15-8, in the Round of 16, and the USA’s Rhonda Rajsich, 15-1, 15-13. Mendez lost the semi-final to Guatemalan Gabriela Martinez, 15-8, 15-3. She played Women's Doubles with Maria Jose Vargas, and they lost in the quarterfinals to Guatemalans Gabriela Martinez and Maria Renee Rodriguez, 15-2, 15-8. So, she came away from San José with her first World Championship medal: bronze in Women’s Singles.

At the 2019 Pan American Championships in Barranquilla, Colombia, Mendez reached the semi-finals in Women’s Singles, as she beat Mexico’s Montserrat Mejia in the quarterfinals, 15-13, 15-13. But in the semis, she lost to her Argentina team-mate Maria Jose Vargas, 15-9, 14-15, 11-7. In Women’s Doubles, Mendez and Vargas beat Chileans Carla Muñoz and Josefa Parada, 15-7, 15-8, in the Round of 16, but they lost in the quarterfinals to Longoria and Samantha Salas of Mexico, 15-7, 15-6.

In the 2018-19 LPRT season, Mendez didn’t reach a semi-final, but she played all 10 events and was in eight quarterfinals. Mendez ended the season ranked 6th.

Mendez played at the 2019 Pan American Games in Lima, Peru, which was her 2nd Pan Am Games, but first for Argentina. She got to the semi-finals in Women’s Singles. Mendez beat Guatemala’s Gabriela Martinez, 15-10, 12-15, 11-6, in the Round of 16, and Ecuador’s Maria Paz Muñoz in the quarterfinals, 15-5, 10-15, 11-7. In the semi-finals, Mendez lost to Mexican Paola Longoria, 15-10, 15-10. In Women’s Doubles, she and Maria Jose Vargas beat Canadians Frédérique Lambert and Jennifer Saunders, 15-9, 15-9, in the quarterfinals, but lost to Guatemalans Martinez and Maria Renee Rodriguez in the semi-finals, 15-9, 10-15, 11-1. Then in the Women’s Team event, Mendez and Vargas were runners-up to Mexico. Thus, Mendez took home three medals - one silver and two bronze - from Lima.

So far in the 2018-19 LPRT season Mendez has been in one semi-final - the 3rd of his career - and three quarterfinals out of five events.

Mendez won two gold medals at the 2022 Pan American Racquetball Championships. She won gold in Women's Doubles with Maria Jose Vargas, defeating Mexicans Alexandra Herrera and Samantha Salas in the final, 15-14, 14-15, 15-10, 8-15, 11-9. She also helped Argentina to gold in the Women's Team event, when they defeated Canada in the quarterfinals, the USA in the semi-finals, and Mexico in the final. Mendez also played in Women's Singles, but lost in the quarterfinals to Gabriela Martinez of Guatemala, 12-15, 14-15, 15-11, 15-13, 11-8.

Mendez medalled twice at the 2022 World Championships. In singles, she lost to Mexican Alexandra Herrera in the quarterfinals, 11-8, 11-3, 11-8. In the Women's Doubles final, she and Valeria Centellas lost to Mexicans Paola Longoria and Samantha Salas in five games, 11-6, 15-17, 11-9, 9-11, 12-10, resulting in a silver medal. In the Women's Team event, Mendez earned a bronze medal, as Argentina reached the semi-finals, but then lost to Bolivia.

At the 2023 Pan American Racquetball Championships, Mendez was a double bronze medalist. In Women's Singles, she defeated Bolivian Yasmine Sabja, 11-8, 11-8, 13-15, 12-10, in the quarterfinals, but lost in the semi-finals to Mexican Montserrat Mejia, 11-4, 11-5, 8-11, 11-5. She played Women's Doubles with Valeria Centellas, and they lost in the semi-finals to Mexicans Alexandra Herrera and Mejia, 11-9, 11-8, 11-4.

Mendez earned two silver medals at the 2023 Pan American Games in Santiago, Chile. In singles, she lost in the quarterfinals to Costa Rican Maricruz Ortiz, 11-8, 9-11, 15-13, 10-12, 12-10. Mendez and Maria Jose Vargas played Women's Doubles, and they defeated Americans Michelle Key and Erika Manilla in the quarterfinals, 10-12, 11-9, 11-5, 12-10, and Mexicans Alexandra Herrera and Montserrat Mejia in the semi-finals, 5-11, 11-13, 3-11, 11-7, 11-7. But they lost the final to Guatemalans Gabriela Martinez and Maria Renee Rodriguez, 11-2, 8-11, 14-12, 11-6. Finally, in the Women's Team event, Mendez and Vargas were runners up to the Mexican team.

Mendez won four medals at the 2024 Pan American Racquetball Championships: two gold in Women's Doubles and the Women's Team event and two bronze in Women's Singles and Mixed Doubles. In singles, she defeated Canadian Danielle Ramsay in the quarterfinals, 4-11, 10-12, 11-4, 11-3, 11-8, but lost to Chilean Carla Muñoz in the semi-finals, 11-2, 7-11, 11-6, 11-7. In doubles, she and Maria Jose Vargas defeated Americans Naomi Ros and Lexi York in the final, 7-11, 11-8, 10-12, 11-9, 11-9. They also won the Women's Team competition, defeating the Dominican Republic in the final. In Mixed Doubles, Mendez and Gerson Miranda Martinez lost in the semi-finals to Canadians Coby Iwaasa and Juliette Parent, 11-9, 13-11, 7-11, 7-11, 11-7.

At the 2024 Racquetball World Championships in San Antonio, Texas, Mendez earned two silver medals in Women's Doubles and the Women's Team event. In Women's Doubles they defeated Canadians Frédérique Lambert and Juliette Parent in the semi-finals, 11-6, 11-4, 11-2, but lost in the final to Mexicans Alexandra Herrera and Montserrat Mejia, 11-3, 9-11, 15-13, 7-11, 11-7. They also lost to Mexico in the Women's Team event final, after they defeated the Bolivia in the semi-finals. Mendez also played singles at Worlds, losing to Chilean Carla Muñoz in the quarterfinals, 9-11, 11-7, 11-5, 11-4.

Mendez won gold in the Women's Team event and silver in Mixed Doubles with Gerson Miranda at the 2026 Pan American Racquetball Championships. In the team event, Argentina beat Costa Rica in the semi-finals, and Mexico in the final. In Mixed Doubles, Mendez and Miranda defeated Mexicans Andree Parrilla and Jessica Parrilla in the semi-finals, 10-12, 11-8, 11-8, 5-11, 11-7, but lost the final to Costa Ricans Andrés Acuña and Larissa Faeth, 11-8, 11-8, 13-15, 11-7. She also played Women's Singles, but did not advance to the medal round after finishing 3rd in her group.

== Career summary ==
Mendez played three times for her native Bolivia, and has played several times for Argentina, winning over 25 medals, including 7 gold medals. In ten seasons on the Ladies Professional Racquetball Tour, Mendez has been in the top 10 nine times.

=== Career record ===
This table lists Mendez’s results across annual events.

Event	2016	2017	2018	2019	2020	2021	2022	2023	2024	2025	2026
US Open	QF	SF	QF	QF	P	16	QF	-	-	-	-
US Open Doubles	16	16	QF	-	P	SF	W	-	-	-	-
LPRT Rank	-	12	7	6	5	6	4	10	7	5	5

== See also ==
- List of racquetball players
