= Alexandra Herrera =

Mexican racquetball player

Personal information
- Born: Alexandra Herrera; January 10, 1995 (age 31) Mexico
Medal record
Women's Racquetball
Representing Mexico
| Event | 1st | 2nd | 3rd |
|---|---|---|---|
| Pan American Games | 1 | 0 | 1 |
| World Championships | 3 | 1 | 1 |
| Pan American Championships | 3 | 5 | 2 |
| Central American and Caribbean Games | 5 | 0 | 1 |
| Total | 12 | 6 | 5 |
Pan American Games
| Gold medal – first place | 2023 Santiago | Women's team |
| Bronze medal – third place | 2023 Santiago | Doubles |
World Championships
| Gold medal – first place | 2024 San Antonio | Doubles |
| Gold medal – first place | 2024 San Antonio | Women’s team |
| Gold medal – first place | 2022 San Luis Potosi | Women’s team |
| Bronze medal – third place | 2022 San Luis Potosi | Singles |
| Silver medal – second place | 2018 San José | Doubles |
Pan Am Championships
| Bronze medal – third place | 2026 Guatemala City | Singles |
| Silver medal – second place | 2026 Guatemala City | Doubles |
| Silver medal – second place | 2026 Guatemala City | Team |
| Silver medal – second place | 2025 Guatemala City | Doubles |
| Bronze medal – third place | 2025 Guatemala City | Singles |
| Gold medal – first place | 2025 Guatemala City | Team |
| Silver medal – second place | 2023 Santa Cruz | Doubles |
| Silver medal – second place | 2023 Santa Cruz | Team |
| Gold medal – first place | 2023 Guatemala City | Doubles |
| Gold medal – first place | 2018 Temuco | Doubles |
Central American and Caribbean Games
| Gold medal – first place | 2026 Santo Domingo | Singles |
| Gold medal – first place | 2026 Santo Domingo | Doubles |
| Gold medal – first place | 2023 San Salvador | Doubles |
| Gold medal – first place | 2023 San Salvador | Team |
| Gold medal – first place | 2018 Barranquilla | Team |
| Bronze medal – third place | 2018 Barranquilla | Singles |

Alexandra Herrera (born January 10, 1995) is a Mexican racquetball player. She is the current World Champion and Central American and Caribbean Games champion in Women's Doubles (both with Montserrat Mejia). A left-handed player, Herrera was the #2 player on the Ladies Professional Racquetball Tour in 2020-21 and again in 2021–22, two of her 11 seasons in the LPRT top 10.

== Junior years - 2010-2014 ==
Herrera played for Mexico at the 2010 International Racquetball Federation (IRF)] World Junior Championship in Los Angeles, California, losing in the quarterfinals of U14 Girls Singles to Natalia Mendez, 9–15, 15–7, 11–8.

In 2011, Herrera played doubles with Ximena Gonzalez at World Juniors in Santo Domingo, Dominican Republic, and they won Girls U16 Doubles, going undefeated in a six country round robin competition. She also won Girls U16 Singles by defeating American Kelani Bailey in the final, 15–11, 5–15, 11–3.

Herrera played U18 at World Juniors in 2012 in Los Angeles, California. She lost in the quarterfinals of Girls U18 Singles to Adriana Riveros, 15–8, 15–2. In Girls U18 Doubles, Herrera and Natalia Villagomez finished 3rd.

In 2013 in Sucre, Bolivia, Herrera lost in the quarterfinals of Girls U18 Singles to team-mate Lucia Gonzalez, 13–15, 15–9, 11–4. But she won Girls U18 Doubles with Ximena Gonzalez, going undefeated in a three team round robin.

She and Ximena Gonzalez successfully defended that Girls U18 Doubles title in 2014 at World Juniors, in Cali, Colombia, where they defeated Gabriela Martinez and Maria Renee Rodriguez in the final, 15–9, 7–15, 11–2. And in singles, Herrera defeated team-mate Gonzalez in the Girls U18 final, 11–15, 15–6, 11–8.

== Pro tour play begins - 2014-2022 ==
Herrera started to play on the Ladies Professional Racquetball Tour (LPRT) regularly in the 2014–15 season, made her first semi-final, and finished 13th at the end of the season. She did win her first LPRT doubles title that season at the 2015 New Jersey Open with Ximena Gonzalez.

She was also in a final in the 2015-16 LPRT season, and won doubles at the 2015 Christmas Classic with Paola Longoria. Herrera finished that season ranked 8th, her first time in the top 10.

Herrera reached an LPRT final for the first time in the 2016–17 season, and did it a second time that season, helping her to finish 5th in the rankings. She won a third doubles title that season: the 2016 Atlanta Championships with Jordan Cooperrider.

== Mexican debut - 2018-2022 ==
Herrera made her senior team debut for Mexico at the 2018 Pan American Championships in Temuco, Chile, where she won gold in Women's Doubles with Paola Longoria. They defeated Bolivians Angélica Barrios and Jenny Daza in the semi-finals, 15–8, 15–8, and then Guatemalans Gabriela Martinez and Maria Renee Rodriguez, 9–15, 15–1, 11–8.

At the 2018 Central American and Caribbean Games in Barranquilla, Colombia, Herrera played singles and in the women's team event. She earned medals in both events. Herrera was a bronze medalist in singles, losing to Guatemala's Gabriela Martinez in the semi-finals, 15–2, 0–15, 11–7, but winning gold in the Women's Team event with Paola Longoria and Samantha Salas, as they beat Colombia in the final, with Herrera defeating Cristina Amaya, 15–7, 15–12, in the first match of the final.

Herrera also played at the 2018 World Championships, which was her first time at Worlds. The 2018 World Championships were in San José, Costa Rica, where she and Montserrat Mejia lost in the final of Women's Doubles to Bolivians Valeria Centellas and Yasmine Sabja, 8–15, 15–14, 11–2. They reached the final by defeating Colombians Cristina Amaya and Adriana Riveros, 15–8, 15–4, in the semi-finals.

Herrera next played at Worlds in 2022 in San Luis Potosí, Mexico, playing singles and in the women's team event. In singles, she earned a bronze medal by reaching the semi-finals with wins over Colombian Cristina Amaya, 11–8, 11–7, 11–7, in the Round of 16, and Argentina's Natalia Mendez, 11–8, 11–3, 11–8, in the quarterfinals before losing to Guatemalan Gabriela Martinez, 12–10, 11–6, 11–9. In the women's team event, Herrera helped Mexico win gold by defeating the US in the semi-finals and Bolivia in the final.

She got her first wins on the Ladies Professional Racquetball Tour in the 2021–22 season by defeating Paola Longoria in back to back finals. In the 2022 Vero Beach Open, Herrera defeated Longoria, 15–14, 15–13, and then beat her again at the 2022 Boston Open. Those wins helped Herrera finish #2 in the rankings for a second consecutive season.

== Winning at Worlds - 2023-present ==
Herrera won gold in doubles at the 2023 Pan American Racquetball Championships in Guatemala City, Guatemala, where she and Montserrat Mejia defeated Guatemalans Gabriela Martinez and Maria Renee Rodriguez in the final, 11–6, 11–6, 12–10.

Herrera finished 3rd at the end of the 2022-23 Ladies Professional Racquetball Tour season. She won one event that season: the LPRT at the Beach event in Chesapeake, Virginia, where she beat Brenda Laime in the final, 15–7, 15–12. That was her 3rd career win.

Herrera competed at the 2023 Central American and Caribbean Games, and won two gold medals. She won gold in both doubles and the women's team event. In the doubles final, Herrera and Montserrat Mejia came back from two games down to defeat Gabriela Martinez and Maria Renee Rodriguez, 9–11, 8–11, 11–7, 13–11, 11–6. She also helped Mexico defeat the Centro Caribe Sports team in the women's team final.

In 2023, Herrera represented Mexico at the 2023 Pan American Games in Santiago, Chile, where she earned two medals. She and Montserrat Mejia were bronze medalists in Women's Doubles. The lost to Argentina's Natalia Mendez and Maria Jose Vargas in the semi-finals, 5–11, 13–11, 3–11, 11–7, 11–7. Then Herrera, Mejia and Paola Longoria won the Women's Team event and defeated Argentina to do so, 2–1. In that final, Herrera and Mejia won the deciding doubles match, beating Mendez and Vargas in three straight games, 14–12, 11–7, 11–5.

Herrera won six of the seven LPRT doubles titles - with partner Montserrat Mejia - in the 2023-24 LPRT season, and in singles, she was in two finals, and finished the season ranked 4th.

Herrera and Montserrat Mejia won gold in Women's Doubles at the 2024 World Championships in San Antonio, Texas. They defeated Guatemalans Gabriela Martinez and Maria Renee Rodriguez in the semi-finals, 11–4, 12–10, 11–9, and Argentina's Natalia Mendez and Maria Jose Vargas in the final, 11–3, 9–11, 15–13, 7–11, 11–7. She also helped Mexico win the Women's Team title, as they defeated the US in the semi-finals and Argentina in the final.

Her success with Montserrat Mejia at Worlds led to them being named World Games Athletes of the Month for August 2024.

Herrera won three gold medals at the 2026 Central American and Caribbean Games in Santo Domingo, Dominican Republic. She defeated Gabriela Martinez of Guatemala in Women's Singles final, 11–6, 12–10, 11–9. In Women's Doubles, Herrera and Montserrat Mejia beat Martinez and Maria Renee Rodiguez in the final, 11–8, 11–4, 11–6. In the Women's Team final with Mexico versus Guatemala, Herrera lost her singles match to Martinez, which forced a tie-breaking doubles match that she and Mejia won to take the gold medal. Herrera now has seven Central American and Caribbean Games medals: six gold and one bronze.

== Career summary ==
Herrera has been successful both internationally for Mexico - winning gold at the World Championships, Pan American Games, Pan American Championships and Central American and Caribbean Games - and on the Ladies Professional Racquetball Tour, winning three events in her career and finishing two seasons as the #2 player on tour.

=== Career record ===
This table lists Herrera's results across annual events.

| Event | 2012 | 2013 | 2014 | 2015 | 2016 | 2017 | 2018 | 2019 | 2020 | 2021 | 2022 | 2023 | 2024 | 2025 | 2026 |
| US Open Singles | 32 | 32 | 16 | 32 | 32 | QF | QF | QF | P | 16 | SF | - | - | - | - |
| US Open Doubles | | | F | F | Q | F | W | F | P | F | SF | - | - | - | - |
| LPRT Rank | | 29 | 32 | 13 | 8 | 5 | 4 | 4 | 4 | 2 | 2 | 3 | 4 | 8 | 8 |

Note: W = winner, F = finalist, SF = semi-finalist, QF = quarterfinalist, 16 = Round of 16, 32 = Round of 32, 64 = Round of 64, 128 = Round of 128. P = Cancelled due to COVID pandemic.

== See also ==
- List of racquetball players
