= 2024 Racquetball World Championships – Women's doubles =

Women's doubles at the XXII Racquetball World Championships
- Location: San Antonio, Texas, United States
- Dates: August 24–31, 2024

Medalists
gold medal	(Mexico) Alexandra Herrera & Montserrat Mejia
silver medal	(Argentina) Natalia Mendez & Maria Jose Vargas
bronze medal	(Guatemala) Gabriela Martinez & Maria Renee Rodriguez (Canada) Frédérique Lambert & Juliette Parent

The International Racquetball Federation's 22nd Racquetball World Championships were held in San Antonio, Texas, United States from August 24–31, 2024. This was the first time that Worlds was held in the USA since 1996, when it was held in Phoenix, Arizona.

The 2024 World Championships used a bestof-five games match format, with each game played to 11 points, win by 2, with rally scoring.

Mexicans Alexandra Herrera and Montserrat Mejia won women's doubles for the first time. They were in the final in 2018, but lost to Bolivians Valeria Centellas and Yasmine Sabja. Mexico defeated Argentina in the final, as Herrera and Mejia needed five games to defeat Maria Jose Vargas and Natalia Mendez, 11–3, 9–11, 15–13, 7–11, 11–7. This was the sixth time a Mexican team won the title.

== Tournament format ==
The 2022 World Championships used a two-stage format to determine the World Champions. Initially, players competed in separate groups over three days. The results were used to seed players for the medal round, with only the top two players from each group advancing to the medal round.

== Women's doubles ==
=== Preliminary round ===
Group 1

Players	Pld	W	L	GW	GL	PW	PL	Place
(Mexico) Alexandra Herrera & Montserrat Mejia	2	2	0	6	0	66	21	1
(Chile) Carla Muñoz & Paula Mansilla	2	1	1	3	4	55	61	2
(Japan) Ayako Hanashi & Saki Kokido	3	0	2	1	6	36	75	3

Group 2

Players	Pld	W	L	GW	GL	PW	PL	Place
(Argentina) Natalia Méndez & Maria Jose Vargas	2	2	0	6	0	66	42	1
(Ecuador) María José Muñoz & Ana Lucia Sarmiento	2	1	1	3	3	58	56	2
(Republic of Ireland) Elaine Murphy & Antonia Neary	2	0	2	0	6	40	66	3

Group 3

Players	Pld	W	L	GW	GL	PW	PL	Place
(United States) Kelani Lawrence & Hollie Scott	2	2	0	6	1	76	48	1
(Bolivia) Angélica Barrios & Jenny Daza	2	1	1	4	4	82	69	2
(Chile) Paula Mansilla & Carla Muñoz	2	0	2	1	6	35	76	3

Group 4

Players	Pld	W	L	GW	GL	PW	PL	Place
(Canada) Frédérique Lambert & Juliette Parent	3	3	0	9	2	119	86	1
(Guatemala) Gabriela Martinez & Maria Renee Rodriguez	2	2	1	7	4	110	88	2
(Dominican Republic) María Céspedes & Merynanyelly Delgado	2	1	2	9	1	106	94	3
(Costa Rica) Larissa Faeth & Jimena Gómez	2	0	3	0	9	57	101	4

=== Medal round ===
Quarterfinals
1	(Mexico) Alexandra Herrera & Montserrat Mejia	11	11	11
8	(Chile) Paula Mansilla & Carla Muñoz	6	7	2
5	(Guatemala) Gabriela Martinez & María Renee Rodríguez	11	11	11
4	(United States) Kelani Lawrence & Hollie Scott	8	8	8
3	(Canada) Frédérique Lambert & Juliette Parent	11	15	11
6	(Bolivia) Angélica Barrios & Jenny Daza	7	13	9
7	(Ecuador) María José Muñoz & Ana Lucia Sarmiento	5	7	6
2	(Argentina) Natalia Mendez & Maria Jose Vargas	11	11	11

Semifinals
1	(Mexico) Alexandra Herrera & Montserrat Mejia	11	12	11
4	(Guatemala) Gabriela Martinez & María Renee Rodríguez	4	10	9
6	(Canada) Frédérique Lambert & Juliette Parent	6	4	2
2	(Argentina) Natalia Mendez & Maria Jose Vargas	11	11	11

Final
1	(Mexico) Alexandra Herrera & Montserrat Mejia	11	9	15	7	11
2	(Argentina) Natalia Mendez & Maria Jose Vargas	3	11	13	11	7
