= Gabriela Martínez =

Guatemalan racquetball player (born 1999)

Gabriela Martinez
Personal information
- Nickname: Gabby
- Born: Ana Gabriela Martinez; August 2, 1999 (age 27) Guatemala

Sport
- Sport: Racquetball
Medal record
Women's Racquetball
Representing Guatemala
Event	1st	2nd	3rd
Pan American Games	0	1	0
World Championships	1	3	6
Pan American Championships	0	4	6
Central American and Caribbean Games	0	7	2
Bolivarian Games	0	2	0
World Games	0	1	1
Total	1	18	15
World Championships
Silver medal – second place	2024 San Antonio	Singles
Bronze medal – third place	2024 San Antonio	Doubles
Bronze medal – third place	2024 San Antonio	Mixed Doubles
Bronze medal – third place	2021 Guatemala City	Doubles
Gold medal – first place	2018 San José	Singles
Silver medal – second place	2016 Cali	Singles
Silver medal – second place	2022 San Luis Potosi	Singles
Bronze medal – third place	2018 San José	Doubles
Bronze medal – third place	2021 Guatemala City	Doubles
Bronze medal – third place	2022 San Luis Potosi	Doubles
Pan American Games
Silver medal – second place	2019 Lima	Doubles
Central American and Caribbean Games
Silver medal – second place	2026 Santo Domingo	Singles
Silver medal – second place	2026 Santo Domingo	Doubles
Silver medal – second place	2026 Santo Domingo	Team
Silver medal – second place	2014 Veracruz	Doubles
Silver medal – second place	2014 Veracruz	Team
Silver medal – second place	2018 Barranquilla	Singles
Silver medal – second place	2018 Barranquilla	Doubles
Bronze medal – third place	2014 Veracruz	Singles
Bronze medal – third place	2018 Barranquilla	Team
Bolivarian Games
Silver medal – second place	2017 Santa Marta	Doubles
Silver medal – second place	2017 Santa Marta	Team
Pan American Championships
Silver medal – second place	2026 Guatemala	Singles
Bronze medal – third place	2026 Guatemala	Doubles
Silver medal – second place	2025 Guatemala	Mixed Doubles
Silver medal – second place	2023 Guatemala	Doubles
Bronze medal – third place	2022 Santa Cruz	Singles
Silver medal – second place	2018 Temuco	Doubles
Bronze medal – third place	2018 Temuco	Singles
Bronze medal – third place	2016 San Luis Potosi	Singles
Bronze medal – third place	2017 San José	Singles
Bronze medal – third place	2017 San José	Doubles
The World Games
Bronze medal – third place	2025 Chengdu	Singles
Silver medal – second place	2022 Birmingham	Singles
Representing Independent Athletes Team
Event	1st	2nd	3rd
Pan American Games	1	0	1
Central American and Caribbean Games	0	4	0
Total	1	4	1
Representing Independent Athletes Team
Pan American Games
Gold medal – first place	2023 Santiago	Doubles
Bronze medal – third place	2023 Santiago	Team
Representing Centro Caribe Sports
Central American and Caribbean Games
Silver medal – second place	2023 San Salvador	Singles
Silver medal – second place	2023 San Salvador	Doubles
Silver medal – second place	2023 San Salvador	Mixed Doubles
Silver medal – second place	2023 San Salvador	Team

Gabriela Martinez (born August 2, 1999) is a Guatemalan racquetball player. Martinez is the current Pan American Games Champion in women's doubles (with Maria Renee Rodriguez). She is a former International Racquetball Federation (IRF) World Champion in the women's singles, winning the title at the 2018 World Championships. Martinez has competed on the Guatemala National Team at international tournaments since 2012, garnering many medals across her career.

== 2009-2013 - Early years ==
Martinez first competed at the International Racquetball Federation (IRF) Junior World Championships in 2009 in Santo Domingo, Dominican Republic, where she lost to Mary Zeng (USA), 10-15, 15-13, 11-3, in the semi-finals of Girls U10. But she won Girls U10 the next year in Los Angeles, when she defeated Mexican Montserrat Mejia, 15-1, 6-15, 11-2, in the final.

Martinez represented Guatemala at the World Championships for the first time in 2012, when she was 13. She competed in Women's Doubles with Maria Renee Rodriguez, and lost in the Round of 16 to the South Korean team of Malhee Kwon and Mi Ok An, 10-15, 15-14, 11-7. But they defeated South Korea in Women's Team event Round of 16, 2 matches to 1, and then lost to Canada in quarterfinals, 2-0.

Later in 2012, she won Girls U12 at the World Junior Championships in Los Angeles by defeating Bolivian Wanda Carvajal in the final, 15-13, 15-13, and Martinez also won Girls U16 Doubles with Rodriguez.

Martinez and Rodriguez played Women's Doubles at the 2013 Pan American Championships in Cali, Colombia, losing in the round of 16 to Colombians Cristina Amaya and Carline Gomez.

Martinez won girls' U14 singles at the 2013 Junior World Championships in Sucre, Bolivia, defeating Mexican Erin Rivera in the final, 15-9, 15-8. In Sucre, she was also 3rd in U18 Girls Doubles with Rodriguez.

== 2014-2015 - First podiums ==
In 2014, Martinez competed at the Pan American Championships in women's singles and women's doubles (with Rodgriguez). She lost to Maria Paz Muñoz of Ecuador, 15-4, 15-9, in the round of 32 in singles, and as in 2013, Martinez and Rodriguez lost in the round of 16, but this time to Costa Ricans Melania Sauma and Sofia Soley, 15-13, 6-15, 11-10.

Martinez went to her second World Championships in 2014 in Burlington, Ontario, Canada, where she played both singles and doubles. In women's singles, she defeated Argentina's Véronique Guillemette, 15-9, 10-15, 11-6, in the round of 32, but then lost to Maria Jose Vargas of Argentina, 15-5, 15-5. In women's doubles, she and Maria Renee Rodriguez lost to Mexicans Paola Longoria and Samantha Salas, 15-6, 15-4, in the round of 16.

At the 2014 Junior World Championships in Cali, Colombia, Martinez again won girls' U14 by defeating over Wanda Carvajal of Bolivia in the final, 15-2, 15-9. Also in Cali, she and Rodriguez were 2nd in U18 doubles, as they lost to Mexicans Alexandra Herrera and Ximena Gonzalez, 15-9, 7-15, 11-2.

Martinez reached the podium at an international event for the first time at the 2014 Central American and Caribbean Games in Veracruz, Mexico, where she was a triple medalist. Martinez was a silver medalist in both women's doubles (with Maria Renee Rodriguez) and the women's team event as well as a bronze medalist in women's singles, as she lost to Paola Longoria of Mexico in the semi-finals, 15-5, 15-9. In the women's doubles final, Martinez and Rodriguez lost to Mexicans Longoria and Samantha Salas, 15-4, 15-2.

At the 2015 Pan American Championships in Santo Domingo, Dominican Republic, Martinez lost in women's singles to the Dominican Republic's Maria Cespedes, 7-15, 15-12, 11-9. In women's doubles in Santo Domingo, Martinez and Rodriguez reached the quarterfinals, but lost to Bolivians Carola Loma and Adriana Riveros, 6-15, 15-7, 11-7.

Martinez attended her first Pan American Games in Toronto in 2015, when she played women's singles, women's doubles and in the women's team event. In singles, she lost in the round of 16 to Mexican Paola Longoria, 15-3, 15-6, and in doubles, Martinez and Rodriguez lost to Bolivians Carola Loma and Natalia Mendez in the round of 16, 10-15, 15-11, 11-5. She helped put a scare into the host Canadian team in the first round of the women's team event, as she upset Frédérique Lambert in their singles match, and then went to a tie-breaker in the deciding doubles match before Canadians Lambert and Jennifer Saunders were able to pull out the victory.

== 2016-2019 - Breakthrough ==
In 2016, Martinez picked up her first medal at the Pan American Racquetball Championships, as she reached the semi-finals by defeating Michelle Key of the USA in the quarterfinals, 15-7, 10-15, 11-7. In the semis, Martinez lost to Canadian Frédérique Lambert, 15-9, 14-15, 11-5, resulting in a bronze medal. This was just the second podium result for Martinez.

At a couple weeks short of her 17th birthday and with just two podium finishes, little was expected of Martinez coming into the 2016 World Championships in Cali, Colombia. However, she exceeded whatever expectations people had by reaching the finals in women's singles. To get there, Martinez defeated former 2-time World Champion Rhonda Rajsich of the USA in the round of 16, 15-14, 14-15, 11-7, then beat Ecauador's Veronica Sotomayor, 15-9, 15-9, in the quarterfinals, and Mexico's Samantha Salas, 15-11, 14-15, 11-9, in the semi-finals, before falling to 2-time defending champion Paola Longoria of Mexico, 15-12, 15-5. It was Martinez's greatest achievement up to then by far.

She also played women's doubles at Worlds in Cali, where she and Maria Renee Rodriguez defeated Colombians Cristina Amaya and Caroline Gomez in the round of 16, 13-15, 15-13, 11-8, and then lost to Mexicans Longoria and Salas, 15-2, 15-5, in the quarter-finals.

In 2016, Martinez was again a World Junior Champion, as she won girls' U16 at the World Junior Championships in San Luis Potosi, Mexico, by defeating Mexican Montserrat Mejia in final, 15-13, 15-7. She also won Girls U18 Doubles with Andrea Martinez, her older sister.

Martinez earned two bronze medals at the 2017 Pan American Championships in San José, Costa Rica. In women's singles, she got to the semi-finals by defeating Chile's Carla Muñoz, 15-4, 15-8, in the quarterfinals. In the semis, Martinez lost to Paola Longoria of Mexico, 15-7, 15-11. In doubles, Martinez and Andrea Martinez got bronze, as they defeated Canadians Danielle Drury and Jennifer Saunders, 15-7, 15-13, in the round of 16, Argentina's Véronique Guillemette and Natalia Mendez in the quarterfinals, 15-6, 15-9, before losing to Maria Paz Muñoz and Veronica Sotomayor of Ecuador, 10-15, 15-5, 11-4, in the semi-finals.

Martinez had her 1st semi-final appearance on the Ladies Professional Racquetball Tour in August, 2017 in San Luis Potosi, Mexico, as she reached the semi-finals with wins over Cristina Amaya in the round of 16, and Rhonda Rajsich in the quarterfinals. She lost in the semis to Paola Longoria, 11-7, 11-5, 11-9. She hadn't been further than the Round of 16 previously.

Perhaps that performance in San Luis Potosi spurred Longoria to partner with Martinez to play LPRT doubles at the 2017 US Open, and they won the title by defeating Cristina Amaya and Adriana Riveros in the final, 15-5, 15-8.

Martinez lost for the first time since 2010 at the World Junior Championships in 2017 in Minneapolis, as Mexican Monserrat Mejia beat her in the final of girls U18 singles, 15-13, 4-15, 11-5.

Martinez competed in the 2017 Bolivarian Games in Santa Marta, Colombia, where she was a silver medalist in women's singles and the women's team events, and a quarter-finalist in women's singles. In singles, she lost to Cristina Amaya, 15-8, 15-10. In doubles, Martinez and Maria Renee Rodriguez lost to Bolivians Stefanny Barrios and Jenny Daza, 15-14, 4-15, 11-9.

Martinez and Rodriguez were silver medalists in women's doubles at the 2018 Pan American Championships in Temuco, Chile, where they lost in the final to Mexicans Paola Longoria and Alexandra Herrera, 9-15, 15-1, 11-8. Martinez also earned a bronze medal in women's singles in Temuco, as she beat Argentina's Natalia Mendez, 15-12, 10-15, 11-2, in the quarter-finals, and then lost to eventual champion Rhonda Rajsich of the USA, 15-13, 15-10.

She was also a multiple medalist at the 2018 Central American & Caribbean Games in Barranquilla, Colombia. In women's singles, Martinez defeated Mexico's Alexandra Herrera in the semi-finals, 15-2, 0-15, 11-7, and then lost the finals to Herrera's team-mate Paola Longoria, 15-13, 15-7. In women's doubles, Martinez and Rodriguez beat Colombians Cristina Amaya and Adriana Riveros in the semi-finals, 15-12, 12-15, 11-4, and then went breaker with Mexicans Longoria and Samantha Salas, but lost, 9-15, 15-9, 11-5. In the women's team event, Martinez and Rodriguez lost to Colombia, 2-1, in the semi-finals. Martinez won her match against Riveros, but they lost the doubles to Riveros and Amaya and Amaya defeated Rodriguez in the deciding match. Thus, Martinez went home from Barranquilla with two silver medals and a bronze.

Martinez won the women's singles World Championship at the World Championships. Seeded 6th in the medal round, Martinez beat Canadian veteran Jennifer Saunders, 15-2, 15-5, in the round of 16, Mexican Samantha Salas, 15-4, 15-12, in the quarter-finals, and Argentina's Natalia Mendez, 15-8, 15-3, in the semi-finals, to set up a rematch of the 2016 final with 3-time defending champion Paola Longoria of Mexico. In the final, Martinez came back from a game down to upset Longoria and win in three games, 8-15, 15-6, 11-6, claiming her first gold medal in international competition. Martinez, at 19, became the youngest woman to be World Champion passing Canadian Christie Van Hees, who was 21 when she won in 1998.

In women's doubles at Worlds, Martinez and Rodriguez lost in the semi-finals to Bolivians Valeria Centellas and Yasmine Sabja, when Martinez picked up an injury in the second game of the match. They finished that game but then defaulted in the tie-breaker. So, Martinez was a double medalist at Worlds for the first time: gold in singles and bronze in doubles.

2018 continued to be a great year for Martinez, as she reached the semi-finals of the US Open Racquetball Championships - racquetball's premier pro event - for the first time. She defeated Alexandra Herrera in the quarterfinals, 11-6, 11-8, 6-11, 11-9, to set up a rematch of the 2018 Worlds final with Paola Longoria. This time Longoria won in three straight games, 11-5, 11-0, 11-3.

With that success, Martinez was expected to win Girls U18 at the World Junior Championships in San Luis Potosi, Mexico in what was her last year of junior eligibility. However, for the 2nd consecutive year she lost in the final to Mexico's Montserrat Mejia, 15-14, 8-15, 11-6. Thus, Martinez finished 2018 as World Champion, but not World Junior Champion.

Martinez wasn't at the 2019 Pan American Championships, but she was on the Guatemalan team for the 2019 Pan American Games in Lima, Peru. In women's singles she lost in the round of 16 to Natalia Mendez of Argentina, 15-10, 12-15, 11-6. But in women's doubles, she and Maria Renee Rodriguez got silver, as they reached the final with a wins over Colombians Cristina Amaya and Adriana Riveros, 12-15, 15-11, 11-8, in the quarter-finals, and Argentina's Natalia Mendez and Maria Jose Vargas, 15-9, 10-15, 11-1, but then lost to Mexicans Paola Longoria and Samantha Salas in three games, 15-5, 11-15, 11-5. In the women's team event, she and Rodriguez lost to Bolivia in the quarter-finals.

== 2021 to present - Competition resumes after pandemic ==
Martinez would have defended her Women's Singles World Championship in 2020, but the COVID-19 pandemic pushed the event back to 2021, when Guatemala City hosted the 2021 Racquetball World Championships. Martinez's title defense fell short, as she lost in the women's singles quarterfinals to Argentina's Natalia Mendez, 9-15, 15-10, 11-7. However, Martinez and Maria Renee Rodriguez were bronze medalists in women's doubles, as they lost in the semi-finals to Mexicans Paola Longoria and Samantha Salas, 15-9, 15-4.

Martinez was also on the podium at the 2022 Pan American Championships in Santa Cruz de la Sierra, Bolivia, earning bronze in women's singles. She defeated Natalia Mendez of Argentina, 12-15, 14-15, 15-11, 15-13, 11-8, in the quarter-finals, but lost to Bolivian Angelica Barrios in the semi-finals, 15-10, 9-15, 15-7, 15-11. Martinez played mixed doubles with Edwin Galicia in Bolivia, and they lost in the quarter-finals to Bolivians Micaela Meneses and Conrrado Moscoso, 15-10, 15-8, 15-12.

Her results at the 2021 World Championships qualified Martinez for the 2022 World Games in Birmingham, Alabama. Martinez reached the women's singles final in Birmingham by defeating American Rhonda Rajsich in the quarter-finals, 15-8, 15-9, 15-8, and Mexican Samantha Salas in the semi-finals, 12-15, 15-5, 15-11, 15-7. But in the final, Martinez lost to Paola Longoria of Mexico, 15-2, 9-15, 15-8, 15-9.

At the 2022 World Championships in San Luis Potosi, Mexico, Martinez made it to the women's singles final for the third consecutive time. She defeated Rhonda Rajsich (USA), 12-10, 11-5, 7-11, 12-10, in the quarter-finals, and Alexandra Herrera (Mexico), 12-10, 11-6, 11-9, in the semi-finals, but lost to Mexican Paola Longoria, 12-10, 11-7, 11-7, in the final. It was the third straight time Martinez and Longoria had played in the women's singles final at Worlds with Martinez winning once and Longoria twice. In women's doubles, Martinez and Maria Renee Rodriguez defeated Colombians Cristina Amaya and Maria Paz Riquelme, 11-2, 13-11, 12-10, in the quarter-finals, but lost to Mexicans Longoria and Samantha Salas, 11-4, 12-10, 11-9, in the semi-finals, resulting in a bronze medal.

Martinez had a chance to win on home soil, as the 2023 Pan American Racquetball Championships were hosted in Guatemala City. She and Maria Renee Rodriguez were in the women's doubles final, but they lost to Mexicans Montserrat Mejia and Alexandra Herrera, 11-6, 11-6, 12-10. They reached the final with wins over Chileans Carla Muñoz and Paula Mansilla in the quarter-finals, 11-3, 12-10, 11-7, and Bolivians Angélica Barrios and Jenny Daza in the semi-finals, 11-9, 11-4, 11-5. In singles, Martinez lost to Mejia, 11-13, 11-8, 11-9, 11-7, in the quarter-finals, and also lost in the quarters of mixed doubles with Juan Salvatierra to Argentina's Diego Garcia and Maria Jose Vargas, 8-11, 11-6, 11-9, 11-8.

Martinez won gold in Women's Doubles at the 2023 Pan American Games in Santiago, Chile with Maria Renee Rodriguez. They defeated Argentina's Natalia Mendez and Maria Jose Vargas, 11-2, 8-11, 14-12, 11-6, in the final, after defeating Bolivians Angélica Barrios and Jenny Daza, 11-13, 11-9, 12-10, 12-10, in the semi-finals. In Women's Singles in Santiago, Martinez lost to Vargas, 13-11, 13-11, 12-10, in the quarterfinals, and in Mixed Doubles she and Edwin Galicia lost to Americans Erika Manilla and Adam Manilla, 11-9, 11-13, 11-6, 8-11, 11-9, in the quarterfinals. Also, Martinez and Rodriguez got bronze in the Women's Team event, as they defeated Costa Rica, 2-1, in the quarterfinals, but lost to Argentina, 2-0, in the semi-finals.

Martinez won bronze at the 2025 World Games in Chengdu, China, as she lost in the semi-finals to María José Vargas of Argentina, 10-12, 14-12, 12-10, 11-6, but had a walkover win in the bronze medal match against Bolivian Angélica Barrios. She played Mixed Doubles with Edwin Galicia, and they lost in the quarterfinals to Canadians Coby Iwaasa and Frédérique Lambert, 11-9, 9-11, 11-4, 11-8. This was Martinez's second World Games medal, as she was the silver medalist in 2022.

At the 2026 Central American and Caribbean Games in Santo Domingo, Dominican Republic, Martinez won three silver medals. She reached the final of Women's Singles by defeating Larissa Faeth of Costa Rica, 12-10, 11-7, 11-2, in the semi-finals, but lost to Mexico's Alexandra Herrera in the final, 11-6, 12-10, 11-9. In Women's Doubles, Martinez and Maria Renee Rodiguez lost to Herrera and Montserrat Mejia in the final, 11-8, 11-4, 11-6, and also lost to Mexico in the Women's Team final.

== Career summary ==
Martinez has represented Guatemala for over a decade, winning 35 medals, highlighted by gold in Women's Singles at the 2018 World Championships and gold in Women's Doubles at the 2023 Pan American Games.

== Personal life and honors ==
Martinez's older sister, Andrea, also played racquetball as a junior, and is married to Canadian racquetballer Coby Iwaasa.

Martinez was named one of the 100 most powerful women in Central America by Forbes Central America in 2023.

== See also ==
- List of racquetball players
