= Racquetball at the 2023 Central American and Caribbean Games =

- Venue: Centro Olímpico Juan Pablo Duarte
- Location: (Dominican Republic) Santo Domingo
- Dates: 24 June 2023 – 1 July 2023

The racquetball (Spanish: Ráquetbol) competition at the 2023 Central American and Caribbean Games in San Salvador, El Salvador was held in Santo Domingo, Dominican Republic from 24 June to 1 July 2023 at the Centro Olímpico Juan Pablo Duarte.

== Medal table ==
* Host nation (El Salvador)

Rank	Nation	Gold	Silver	Bronze	Total
1	Mexico (MEX)	7	1	1	9
2	Centro Caribe Sports (CCS)	0	4	3	7
3	Costa Rica (CRC)	0	2	5	7
4	Dominican Republic (DOM)	0	0	3	3
5	Cuba (CUB)	0	0	2	2
Totals (5 entries)		7	7	14	28

== Medal summary ==
=== Men's events ===
Event	Gold	Silver	Bronze
Singles	Eduardo Portillo (MEX)	Rodrigo Montoya (MEX)	Andrés Acuña (CRC) Edwin Galicia (CCS)
Doubles	Mexico (MEX); Rodrigo Montoya; Francisco Mar	Costa Rica (CRC); Andrés Acuña; Gabriel Garcia	Centro Caribe Sports (CCS); Juan Salvatierra; Christian Wer Cuba (CUB); Yandy Espinoza; Maikel Moyet
Team	Mexico (MEX); Rodrigo Montoya; Eduardo Portillo; Francisco Mar	Costa Rica (CRC); Andrés Acuña; Felipe Camacho; Gabriel Garcia	Cuba (CUB); Yandy Espinoza; Maikel Moyet; Cristian Menedez Centro Caribe Sports (CCS); Juan Salvatierra; Edwin Galicia; Christian Wer

=== Women's events ===
Event	Gold	Silver	Bronze
Singles	Paola Longoria (MEX)	Ana Martínez (CCS)	Montserrat Mejía (MEX) Maricruz Ortiz (CRC)
Doubles	Mexico (MEX); Alexandra Herrera; Montserrat Mejía	Centro Caribe Sports (CCS); María Rodríguez; Ana Martínez	Costa Rica (CRC); Jimena Gómez; Maricruz Ortiz Dominican Republic (DOM); Merynanyelly Delgado; Alejandra Jiménez
Team	Mexico (MEX); Paola Longoria; Montserrat Mejia; Alexandra Herrera	Centro Caribe Sports (CCS); Ana Martinez; Anna Aguilar; Maria Rodriguez	Dominican Republic (DOM); Merynanyelly Delgado; María Céspedes; Alejandra Jiménez Costa Rica (CRC); Maricruz Ortiz; Jimena Gomez

=== Mixed events ===
Event	Gold	Silver	Bronze
Doubles	Mexico (MEX); Eduardo Portillo; Paola Longoria	Centro Caribe Sports (CCS); Ana Martínez; Edwin Galicia	Costa Rica (CRC); Maricruz Ortiz; Andrés Acuña Dominican Republic (DOM); Ramón de León; María Céspedes
