= Racquetball at the 2018 Central American and Caribbean Games =

- Venue: Parque de Racquetas La Castellana
- Dates: 20–28 July
- Nations: 8

The racquetball (Spanish: Ráquetbol) competition at the 2018 Central American and Caribbean Games in Barranquilla, Colombia was held from 20 to 28 July 2018 at the Parque de Racquetas La Castellana.

== Tournament format ==
The 2018 Central American and Caribbean Games racquetball competition had two parts: an individual competition with four divisions: Men’s and Women’s Singles and Doubles, as well as a team competition. The individual competitions began with a group stage played as a round robin. The group stage results used to seed teams for the medal round. The individual competition group stages began July 20 for three days followed by the medal round with the finals on July 25. The team competition began July 26 with the finals on July 28. The Men’s and Women’s Team events were a best of three matches - 2 singles and 1 doubles.

== Participating nations ==
Eight countries entered athletes.

- Colombia (5)
- Costa Rica (4)
- Cuba (6)
- Dominican Republic (4)
- Guatemala (5)
- Honduras (3)
- Mexico (7)
- Venezuela (7)

== Medal summary ==
=== Men's events ===
Event	Gold	Silver	Bronze
Singles	Daniel De La Rosa (MEX)	Mario Mercado (COL)	Andrés Acuña (CRC) Luis Pérez (DOM)
Doubles	Mexico (MEX); Álvaro Beltrán; Daniel De La Rosa	Costa Rica (CRC); Andrés Acuña; Felipe Camacho	Dominican Republic (DOM); Luis Pérez; Ramón de León Colombia (COL); Set Cubillos; Mario Mercado
Team	Mexico (MEX); Álvaro Beltrán; Daniel De La Rosa; Rodrigo Montoya	Costa Rica (CRC); Andrés Acuña; Felipe Camacho	Guatemala (GUA); Edwin Galicia; Juan Salvatierra; Christian Wer Cuba (CUB); Enier Chacon; Maykel Moyet

=== Women's events ===
Event	Gold	Silver	Bronze
Singles	Paola Longoria (MEX)	Ana Gabriela Martínez (GUA)	Merynanyelly Delgado (DOM) Alexandra Herrera (MEX)
Doubles	Mexico (MEX); Paola Longoria; Samantha Salas	Guatemala (GUA); Ana Gabriela Martínez; María Rodríguez	Costa Rica (CRC); Maricruz Ortíz; Melania Sauma Colombia (COL); Cristina Amaya; Adriana Riveros
Team	Mexico (MEX); Alexandra Herrera; Paola Longoria; Samantha Salas	Colombia (COL); Cristina Amaya; Adriana Riveros	Costa Rica (CRC); Maricruz Ortíz; Melania Sauma Guatemala (GUA); Ana Gabriela Martínez; María Rodríguez

== Medal table ==
* Host nation (Colombia)

Rank	Nation	Gold	Silver	Bronze	Total
1	Mexico (MEX)	6	0	1	7
2	Costa Rica (CRC)	0	2	3	5
3	Colombia (COL)*	0	2	2	4
3	Guatemala (GUA)	0	2	2	4
5	Dominican Republic (DOM)	0	0	3	3
6	Cuba (CUB)	0	0	1	1
Totals (6 entries)		6	6	12	24

== Women’s Singles ==
=== Pool A ===
Players	Pld	W	L	GF	GA	PF	PA	Points
(Mexico) Paola Longoria	2	2	0	4	0	60	5	4
(Costa Rica) Maricruz Ortíz	2	1	1	2	2	35	32	3
(Venezuela) Diana Rangel	2	0	2	0	4	2	60	2

=== Pool B ===
Players	Pld	W	L	GF	GA	PF	PA	Points
(Guatemala) Ana Gabriela Martínez	2	2	0	4	0	60	29	4
(Colombia) Adriana Riveros	2	1	1	2	2	53	50	3
(Dominican Republic) Merynanyelly Delgado	2	0	2	0	4	26	60	2

=== Pool C ===
Players	Pld	W	L	GF	GA	PF	PA	Points
(Mexico) Alexandra Herrera	3	1	0	2	0	30	16	6
(Venezuela) Mariana Tobon	3	2	1	4	3	82	72	5
(Costa Rica) Melania Sauma	3	1	2	3	4	70	85	4
(Cuba) Loraine Felipe	3	0	3	0	6	30	90	3

=== Pool D ===
Players	Pld	W	L	GF	GA	PF	PA	Points
(Colombia) Cristina Amaya	3	3	0	6	1	97	52	6
(Guatemala) María Reneé Rodríguez	3	2	1	5	2	90	58	5
(Cuba) María Viera	3	1	2	2	4	50	73	4
(Dominican Republic) Alejandra Jiménez	3	0	3	0	6	36	90	3

=== Medal Round ===
First Round
9	(Costa Rica) Melania Sauma	2	4
8	(Colombia) Adriana Riveros	15	15
5	(Venezuela) Mariana Tobon	15	2	8
12	(Dominican Republic) Merynanyelly Delgado	6	15	11
13	(Cuba) Loraine Felipe	0	6
4	(Colombia) Cristina Amaya	15	15
3	(Mexico) Alexandra Herrera	15	15
14	(Dominican Republic) Alejandra Jimenez	5	4
11	(Venezuela) Diana Rangel	2	3
6	(Guatemala) Maria Renee Rodriguez	15	15
7	(Costa Rica) Maricruz Ortiz	14	15	11
10	(Cuba) Maria Viera	15	11	8

Quarterfinals
1	(Mexico) Paola Longoria	15	15
8	(Colombia) Adriana Riveros	8	7
12	(Dominican Republic) Merynanyelly Delgado	15	15
4	(Colombia) Cristina Amaya	10	11
3	(Mexico) Alexandra Herrera	15	15
6	(Guatemala) Maria Renee Rodriguez	12	3
7	(Costa Rica) Maricruz Ortiz	9	4
2	(Guatemala) Ana Gabriela Martinez	15	15

Semi-finals
1	(Mexico) Paola Longoria	15	15
12	(Dominican Republic) Merynanyelly Delgado	0	4
3	(Mexico) Alexandra Herrera	2	15	7
2	(Guatemala) Ana Gabriela Martinez	15	0	11

Final
1	(Mexico) Paola Longoria	15	15
2	(Guatemala) Ana Gabriela Martinez	13	7

== Men’s Singles ==
=== Pool A ===
Players	Pld	W	L	GF	GA	PF	PA	Points
(Mexico) Rodrigo Montoya	3	3	0	6	0	90	15	6
(Cuba) Maykel Moyet	3	2	1	4	2	65	45	5
(Guatemala) Juan José Salvatierra	3	1	2	2	4	50	74	4
(Honduras) Marco Sarmiento	3	0	3	0	6	19	90	3

=== Pool B ===
Players	Pld	W	L	GF	GA	PF	PA	Points
(Costa Rica) Andrés Acuña	3	3	0	6	0	90	40	6
(Dominican Republic) Luis Pérez	3	2	1	4	3	81	63	5
(Colombia) Hosman Gómez	3	1	2	3	4	63	77	4
(Venezuela) Ricardo Gómez	3	0	3	0	6	36	90	3

=== Pool C ===
Players	Pld	W	L	GF	GA	PF	PA	Points
(Mexico) Daniel De La Rosa	3	3	0	6	0	90	6	6
(Dominican Republic) Ramón de León	3	2	1	4	2	66	51	5
(Guatemala) Edwin Galicia	3	1	2	2	4	45	67	4
(Cuba) Robin Romero	3	0	3	0	6	13	90	3

=== Pool D ===
Players	Pld	W	L	GF	GA	PF	PA	Points
(Colombia) Mario Mercado	3	3	0	6	0	90	27	6
(Costa Rica) Felipe Camacho	3	2	1	4	2	67	58	5
(Dominican Republic) Ramón de León	3	1	2	2	5	70	85	4
(Venezuela) Luis Zea	3	0	3	1	6	39	96	3

=== Medal Round ===
First Round
1	(Mexico) Rodrigo Montoya	15	15
16	(Venezuela) Luis Zea	1	5
9	(Honduras) Carlos Medrano	7	0
8	(Dominican Republic) Luis Pérez	15	15
5	(Guatemala) Edwin Galicia	15	15
12	(Colombia) Hosman Gomez	3	2
13	(Honduras) Marco Sarmiento	4	4
4	(Colombia) Mario Mercado	15	15
3	(Mexico) Daniel De La Rosa	15	15
4	(Venezuela) Ricardo Gomez	9	1
11	(Guatemala) Juan Jose Salvatierra	15	15
6	(Costa Rica) Felipe Camacho	3	9
7	(Cuba) Maykel Moyet	15	14	11
10	(Dominican Republic) Ramón de León	5	15	1
15	(Cuba) Robin Romero	1	2
2	(Costa Rica) Andrés Acuña	15	15

Quarterfinals
1	(Mexico) Rodrigo Montoya	10	11
8	(Dominican Republic) Luis Pérez	15	15
5	(Guatemala) Edwin Galicia	10	14
4	(Colombia) Mario Mercado	15	15
3	(Mexico) Daniel De La Rosa	15	15
11	(Guatemala) Juan Jose Salvatierra	3	11
7	(Cuba) Maykel Moyet	9	15	2
2	(Costa Rica) Andrés Acuña	15	13	11

Semifinals
8	(Dominican Republic) Luis Pérez	5	15	4
4	(Colombia) Mario Mercado	15	13	11
3	(Mexico) Daniel De La Rosa	15	15
2	(Costa Rica) Andrés Acuña	7	7

Final
4	(Colombia) Mario Mercado	15	2	5
3	(Mexico) Daniel De La Rosa	9	15	11

== Women’s Doubles ==
=== Pool A ===
Players	Pld	W	L	GF	GA	PF	PA	Points
(Mexico) Paola Longoria (Mexico) Samantha Salas	2	2	0	4	0	60	18	4
(Colombia) Cristina Amaya (Colombia) Adriana Riveros	2	1	1	2	2	46	51	3
(Costa Rica) Maricruz Ortiz (Costa Rica) Melania Sauma	2	0	2	0	4	23	60	2

=== Pool B ===
Players	Pld	W	L	GF	GA	PF	PA	Points
(Guatemala) Ana Gabriela Martínez (Guatemala) María Reneé Rodríguez	3	3	0	6	0	90	47	6
(Cuba) Yurisleidis Allue (Cuba) María Viera	3	2	1	4	2	80	64	5
(Dominican Republic) Merynanyelly Delgado (Dominican Republic) Alejandra Jiménez	3	1	2	2	5	72	87	4
(Venezuela) Mariana Tobon (Venezuela) Lilian Zea	3	0	3	1	6	55	99	3

=== Medal Round ===
Quarterfinals
5	(Cuba) Yurisleidis Allue (Cuba) María Viera	12
4	(Costa Rica) Maricruz Ortiz (Costa Rica) Melania Sauma	15
3	(Colombia) Cristina Amaya (Colombia) Adriana Riveros	15
6	(Dominican Republic) Merynanyelly Degado (Dominican Republic) Alejandra Jiménez	4
7	(Venezuela) Mariana Tobon (Venezuela) Lilian Zea	11
2	(Guatemala) Ana Gabriela Martínez (Guatemala) María Reneé Rodríguez	15

Semifinals
1	(Mexico) Paola Longoria (Mexico) Samantha Salas	15
4	(Costa Rica) Maricruz Ortiz (Costa Rica) Melania Sauma	3
3	(Colombia) Cristina Amaya (Colombia) Adriana Riveros	12
2	(Guatemala) Ana Gabriela Martínez (Guatemala) María Reneé Rodríguez	15

Final
1	(Mexico) Paola Longoria (Mexico) Samantha Salas	9
2	(Guatemala) Ana Gabriela Martínez (Guatemala) María Reneé Rodríguez	15

== Men’s Doubles ==
=== Pool A ===
Players	Pld	W	L	GF	GA	PF	PA	Points
(Mexico) Álvaro Beltrán (Mexico) Daniel De La Rosa	3	3	0	6	2	107	75	6
(Colombia) Set Cubillos (Colombia) Mario Mercado	3	2	1	4	3	83	83	5
(Cuba) Enier Chacon (Cuba) Maykel Moyet	3	1	2	4	4	92	92	4
(Dominican Republic) Luis Perez (Dominican Republic) Ramon De Leon	3	0	3	1	6	68	100	3

=== Pool B ===
Players	Pld	W	L	GF	GA	PF	PA	Points
(Costa Rica) Andrés Acuña (Costa Rica) Felipe Camacho	3	3	0	6	0	90	36	6
(Venezuela) Cesar Castillo (Venezuela) Cesar Castro	3	2	1	4	3	76	75	5
(Guatemala) Edwin Galicia (Guatemala) Christian Wer	3	1	2	3	4	85	83	4
(Honduras) Carlos Medrano (Honduras) Sergio Ortega	3	0	3	0	6	33	90	3

=== Medal Round ===
Quarterfinals					Semifinals				Final
1	(Mexico) Álvaro Beltrán (Mexico) Daniel De La Rosa	15	15
8	(Honduras) Carlos Medrano (Honduras) Sergio Ortega	4	3		1	(Mexico) Álvaro Beltrán (Mexico) Daniel De La Rosa	15	15
5	(Dominican Republic) Ramon De Leon (Dominican Republic) Luis Perez	15	8	11	5	(Dominican Republic) Ramon De Leon (Dominican Republic) Luis Perez	9	11
4	(Venezuela) Cesar Castillo (Venezuela) Cesar Castro	5	15	8					1	(Mexico) Álvaro Beltrán (Mexico) Daniel De La Rosa	15	15
3	(Colombia) Set Cubillos (Colombia) Mario Mercado	15	10	11					2	(Costa Rica) Andrés Acuña (Costa Rica) Felipe Camacho	9	3
6	(Guatemala) Edwin Galicia (Guatemala) Christian Wer	9	15	7	3	(Colombia) Set Cubillos (Colombia) Mario Mercado	4	3
7	(Cuba) Enier Chacon (Cuba) Maykel Moyet	10	15	2	2	(Costa Rica) Andrés Acuña (Costa Rica) Felipe Camacho	15	15
2	(Costa Rica) Andrés Acuña (Costa Rica) Felipe Camacho	15	10	11

== Women's team ==
Quarterfinals
26 July
Dominican Republic	0
Costa Rica	2
26 July
Colombia	2
Venezuela	0
26 July
Cuba	0
Guatemala	2

Semifinals
27 July
Mexico	2
Costa Rica	0
27 July
Colombia	2
Guatemala	1

Final
28 July
Mexico	2
Colombia	0

Quarterfinals

26 July 2018	Dominican Republic	0–2	Costa Rica

Alejandra Jiménez	0–2	Maricruz Ortíz	5–15, 9–15
Merynanyelly Delgado / Alejandra Jiménez	1–2	Maricruz Ortíz / Melania Sauma	9–15, 15–13, 1–11
Merynanyelly Delgado	Melania Sauma	not played

26 July 2018	Colombia	2–0	Venezuela

Cristina Amaya	2–0	Diana Rangel	15–0, 15–1
Cristina Amaya / Adriana Riveros	2–0	Mariana Tobon / Lilian Zea	15–9, 15–9
Adriana Riveros	Mariana Tobon	not played

26 July 2018	Cuba	0–2	Guatemala

Yurisleidis Allue	0–2	María Rodríguez	2–15, 7–15
Yurisleidis Allue / María Viera	0–2	Ana Martínez / María Rodríguez	4–15, 8–15
María Viera	Ana Martínez	not played

Semifinals

27 July 2018	Mexico	2–0	Costa Rica

Paola Longoria	2–0	Melania Sauma	15–2, 15–9
Paola Longoria / Samantha Salas	2–0	Maricruz Ortíz / Melania Sauma	15–3, 15–3
Alexandra Herrera	Maricruz Ortíz	not played

27 July 2018	Colombia	2–1	Guatemala

Adriana Riveros	1–2	Ana Martínez	15-13, 7–15, 6–11
Cristina Amaya / Adriana Riveros	2–1	Ana Martínez / María Rodríguez	13–15, 15–10, 11–7
Cristina Amaya	2–1	María Rodríguez	14–15, 15–6, 11-8

Final

28 July 2018	Mexico	2–0	Colombia

Alexandra Herrera	2–0	Cristina Amaya	15–7, 15–12
Paola Longoria / Samantha Salas	2–0	Cristina Amaya / Adriana Riveros	15–12, 15–5
Paola Longoria	Adriana Riveros	not played

== Men's team ==
Quarterfinals
26 July
Mexico	2
Honduras	0
26 July
Guatemala	2
Dominican Republic	1
26 July
Colombia	1
Cuba	2
26 July
Venezuela	0
Costa Rica	2

Semifinals
27 July
Mexico	2
Guatemala	0
27 July
Cuba	1
Costa Rica	2

Final
28 July
Mexico	2
Costa Rica	0

Quarterfinals

26 July 2018	Mexico	2–0	Honduras

Rodrigo Montoya	2–0	Marco Sarmiento	15–2, 15–3
Álvaro Beltrán / Daniel De La Rosa	2–0	Carlos Medrano / Marco Sarmiento	15–3, 15–4
Daniel De La Rosa	Carlos Medrano	not played

26 July 2018	Guatemala	2–1	Dominican Republic

Juan Salvatierra	2–0	Ramón De Leon	15–13, 15–13
Edwin Galicia / Christian Wer	0–2	Ramón De Leon / Luis Pérez	4–15, 12–15
Edwin Galicia	2–0	Luis Pérez	15–13, 15–4

26 July 2018	Colombia	1–2	Cuba

Mario Mercado	2–1	Enier Chacon	15–6, 14–15, 11–9
Set Cubillos / Mario Mercado	0–2	Enier Chacon / Maykel Moyet	13–15, 12–15
Hosman Gómez	0–2	Maykel Moyet	12–15, 1–15

26 July 2018	Venezuela	0–2	Costa Rica

Ricardo Gómez	0–2	Andrés Acuña	4–15, 6–15
Cesar Castillo / Cesar Castro	0–2	Andrés Acuña / Felipe Camacho	10–15, 10–15
Luis Zea	Felipe Camacho	not played

Semifinals

27 July 2018	Mexico	2–0	Guatemala

Daniel De La Rosa	2–0	Edwin Galicia	15–2, 15–14
Álvaro Beltrán / Daniel De La Rosa	2–0	Edwin Galicia / Christian Wer	15–8, 15–4
Rodrigo Montoya	Juan Salvatierra	not played

27 July 2018	Cuba	1–2	Costa Rica

Maykel Moyet	2–0	Andrés Acuña	15–6, 15–13
Enier Chacon / Maykel Moyet	0–2	Andrés Acuña / Felipe Camacho	7–15, 11–15
Enier Chacon	0–2	Felipe Camacho	6–15, 2–15

Final

28 July 2018	Mexico	2–0	Costa Rica

Rodrigo Montoya	2–0	Andrés Acuña	15–10, 15–2
Álvaro Beltrán / Daniel De La Rosa	2–0	Andrés Acuña / Felipe Camacho	15–9, 15–2
Daniel De La Rosa	Felipe Camacho	not played
