= 2026 Pan American Racquetball Championships =

The XXXVII Pan American Racquetball Championships were held in Guatemala City, Guatemala, March 28 to April 4, 2026. Bolivian Conrrado Moscoso won men's singles, and Argentina's Maria Jose Vargas won women's singles. Mexicans Javier Mar and Rodrigo Montoya won men's doubles while Vargas and Valeria Centellas won women's doubles, and Costa Ricans Andrés Acuña and Larrisa Faeth won mixed doubles. The 2026 championships also had a team event, which was won by Mexico on the men's side and Argentina on the women's side.

== Tournament format ==
The competition had seven events: five individual events and two team events. The individual events were played first: Men's and Women's Singles and Doubles and Mixed Doubles. Each individual event had a group stage followed by a medal round. The results of the group stage were used to seed players for the medal round. The group stage began March 28 and concluded March 30. The medal round began March 31 and concluded April 2. The team events were held from April 2 to 4 with a best of three match format consisting of two singles matches and a doubles match with the order of the matches varying by round.

== Participating nations ==
A total of 73 athletes (45 men & 28 women) from 15 countries participated.

- Argentina (5)
- Bolivia (6)
- Canada (6)
- Chile (5)
- Colombia (4)
- Costa Rica (5)
- Cuba (3)
- Dominican Republic (6)
- Ecuador (6)
- Guatemala (6)
- Mexico (7)
- Peru (1)
- Puerto Rico (1)
- United States (7)
- Venezuela (5)

== Medal summary ==
=== Medal table ===
Rank	Nation	Gold	Silver	Bronze	Total
1	Argentina (ARG)	2	1	0	3
2	Mexico (MEX)	1	2	3	6
3	Bolivia (BOL)	1	0	3	4
4	Costa Rica (CRC)	1	0	0	1
5	Canada (CAN)	0	1	1	2
5	Guatemala (GUA)	0	1	1	2
7	Ecuador (ECU)	0	0	1	1
7	United States (USA)	0	0	1	1
Totals (8 entries)		5	5	10	20

=== Medalists ===
Event	Gold	Silver	Bronze
Men's events
Singles	Conrrado Moscoso; Bolivia	Eduardo Portillo; Mexico	Santiago Borja; Bolivia Samuel Murray; Canada
Doubles	Javier Mar; Rodrigo Montoya; Mexico	Coby Iwaasa; Samuel Murray; Canada	Jake Bredenbeck; Sam Bredenbeck; United States Juan Francisco Cueva; Jose Daniel Ugalde; Ecuador
Team	Javier Mar; Rodrigo Montoya; Andree Parrilla; Eduardo Portillo; Mexico	Luis Aguilar; Santiago Borja; Conrrado Moscoso; Bolivia	Diego García; Gerson Miranda Martinez; Argentina Jake Bredenbeck; Sam Bredenbeck; Thomas Carter; Erik Garcia; United States
Women's events
Singles	Maria Jose Vargas; Argentina	Gabriela Martinez; Guatemala	Montserrat Mejia; Mexico Alexandra Herrera; Mexico
Doubles	Valeria Centellas; Maria Jose Vargas; Argentina	Alexandra Herrera; Montserrat Mejia; Mexico	Rebecca Amaya Ardaya; Camila Rivero; Bolivia Gabriela Martinez; Maria Renee Rodriguez; Guatemala
Team	Valeria Centellas; Natalia Mendez; Maria Jose Vargas; Argentina	Alexandra Herrera; Montserrat Mejia; Jessica Parrilla; Mexico	Larissa Faeth; Maricruz Ortiz; Costa Rica Rebecca Amaya Ardaya; Camila Rivero; Bolivia
Mixed events
Doubles	Andrés Acuña; Larissa Faeth; Costa Rica	Natalia Mendez; Gerson Miranda Martinez; Argentina	Rebecca Amaya Ardaya; Conrrado Moscoso; Bolivia Andree Parrilla; Jessica Parrilla; Mexico

== Men's singles ==
=== Preliminary round ===
Group 1

Players	Pld	W	L	GW	GL	PW	PL	Place
(Bolivia) Conrrado Moscoso	3	3	0	9	0	99	41	1
(Canada) Coby Iwaasa	3	2	1	6	5	93	85	2
(Chile) Alan Natera	3	1	2	5	6	95	91	3
(Venezuela) Alexander Merchan	3	0	3	0	9	29	99	4

Group 2

Players	Pld	W	L	GW	GL	PW	PL	Place
(Mexico) Eduardo Portillo	3	3	0	9	0	102	40	1
(Canada) Samuel Murray	3	2	1	6	3	92	66	2
(Chile) Jaime Mansilla	3	1	2	3	6	58	81	3
(Venezuela) Enzo Angulo	3	0	3	0	9	34	99	4

Group 3

Players	Pld	W	L	GW	GL	PW	PL	Place
(Argentina) Gerson Miranda Martinez	3	3	0	9	2	117	76	1
(Bolivia) Santiago Borja	3	2	1	8	4	109	92	2
(Dominican Republic) Ramon De Leon	3	1	2	4	8	102	117	3
(Colombia) Orlando Josu Huyke	3	0	3	2	9	74	116	4

Group 4

Players	Pld	W	L	GW	GL	PW	PL	Place
(Mexico) Andree Parrilla	3	3	0	9	1	107	66	1
(Costa Rica) Felipe Camacho	3	2	1	7	4	105	85	2
(Cuba) Yandy Espinoza	3	1	2	3	7	79	105	3
(Puerto Rico) Abraham Mercado	3	0	3	2	9	85	120	4

Group 5

Players	Pld	W	L	GW	GL	PW	PL	Place
(Argentina) Diego Garcia	3	3	0	9	2	119	77	1
(United States) Jake Bredenbeck	3	2	1	8	3	115	73	2
(Colombia) Set Cubillos	3	1	2	3	6	72	85	3
(Dominican Republic) Junior Rodriguez	3	0	3	0	9	28	99	4

Group 6

Players	Pld	W	L	GW	GL	PW	PL	Place
(Costa Rica) Andrés Acuña	3	3	0	9	0	99	33	1
(Guatemala) Juan Salvatierra	3	2	1	6	4	83	75	2
(Ecuador) Pablo Vera	3	1	2	4	6	75	86	3
(Cuba) Christhian Menendez	3	0	3	0	9	36	99	4

Group 7

Players	Pld	W	L	GW	GL	PW	PL	Place
(United States) Thomas Carter	3	3	0	9	2	110	66	1
(Guatemala) Christian Aldana	3	2	1	7	5	110	105	2
(Ecuador) Josue Bermeo	3	1	2	6	6	101	105	3
(Dominican Republic) Diego Pimentel	3	0	3	0	9	55	100	4

=== Medal round ===
First Round
9	(United States) Jake Bredenbeck	11	11	11
8	(Guatemala) Christian Aldana	3	9	3
5	(Argentina) Diego Garcia	11	8	11	11	10
12	(Bolivia) Santiago Borja	8	11	13	7	12
13	(Canada) Coby Iwaasa	9	12	11	9	11
4	(Mexico) Andree Parrilla	11	10	8	11	6
3	(Argentina) Gerson Miranda Martinez	5	5	5
14	(Canada) Samuel Murray	11	11	11
11	(Costa Rica) Felipe Camacho	4	6	3
6	(Costa Rica) Andrés Acuña	11	11	11
7	(United States) Thomas Carter	10	10	5
10	(Guatemala) Juan Salvatierra	12	12	11

Quarterfinals
1	(Bolivia) Conrrado Moscoso	8	11	11	11
9	(United States) Jake Bredenbeck	11	5	8	4
5	(Bolivia) Santiago Borja	11	9	12	6	11
4	(Canada) Coby Iwaasa	8	11	10	11	9
3	(Canada) Samuel Murray	9	11	11	11
6	(Costa Rica) Andrés Acuña	11	4	5	5
7	(Guatemala) Juan Salvatierra	11	4	6	11	4
2	(Mexico) Eduardo Portillo	9	11	11	8	11

Semifinals
1	(Bolivia) Conrrado Moscoso	9	11	10	11	11
5	(Bolivia) Santiago Borja	11	9	12	3	4
3	(Canada) Samuel Murray	11	5	11	6	11
2	(Mexico) Eduardo Portillo	8	11	8	11	8

Final
1	(Bolivia) Conrrado Moscoso	8	11	11	11
3	(Mexico) Eduardo Portillo	11	5	8	9

== Men's doubles ==
Group 1

Players	Pld	W	L	GW	GL	PW	PL	Place
(Chile) Diego Gatica & Jaime Mansilla	2	1	1	5	4	74	84	1
(Bolivia) Luis Aguilar & Adrian Jaldin Lobo	2	1	1	4	5	71	75	2
(Ecuador) Juan Francisco Cueva & Jose Daniel Ugalde	2	1	1	5	5	92	78	3

Group 2

Players	Pld	W	L	GW	GL	PW	PL	Place
(Costa Rica) Andrés Acuña & Felipe Segreda	2	2	0	6	3	89	67	1
(Dominican Republic) Luis Perez & Junior Rodriguez	2	1	1	5	3	72	75	2
(Guatemala) Christian Aldana & Hector Sierra Mansilla	2	0	2	1	6	52	71	3

Group 3

Players	Pld	W	L	GW	GL	PW	PL	Place
(Mexico) Javier Mar & Rodrigo Montoya	2	2	0	6	1	74	45	1
(Argentina) Diego Garcia & Gerson Miranda Martinez	2	1	1	4	3	68	62	2
(Cuba) Yandy Espinosa & Maikel Moyet	2	0	2	0	6	32	67	3

Group 4

Players	Pld	W	L	GW	GL	PW	PL	Place
(Canada) Coby Iwaasa & Samuel Murray	3	3	0	9	1	110	59	1
(United States) Jake Bredenbeck & Sam Bredenbeck	3	2	1	7	3	97	71	2
(Venezuela) Enzo Angulo & Alexander Marchan	3	1	2	3	6	60	83	3
(Colombia) Mario Andres Huyke & Orlando Josu Huyke	3	0	3	0	9	45	99	4

=== Medal Round ===
First Round
9	(Ecuador) Juan Francisco Cueva & Jose Daniel Ugalde	11	11	11
8	(Argentina) Diego Garcia & Gerson Miranda Martinez	5	9	9
5	(Bolivia) Luis Aguilar & Adrian Jaldin Lobo	12	11	11
12	(Cuba) Yandy Espinosa & Maikel Moyet	10	2	1
13	(Colombia) Mario Andres Huyke & Orlando Josu Huyke	7	5	6
4	(Canada) Coby Iwaasa & Samuel Murray	11	11	11
11	(Venezuela) Enzo Angulo & Alexander Merchan	4	5	6
6	(Dominican Republic) Luis Perez & Junior Rodriguez	11	11	11
7	(United States) Jake Bredenbeck & Sam Bredenbeck	11	12	11
10	(Guatemala) Christian Aldana & Hector Sierra Mansilla	5	10	4

Quarterfinals
1	(Chile) Diego Gatica & Jaime Mansilla	8	8	4
8	(Ecuador) Juan Francisco Cueva & Jose Daniel Ugalde	11	11	11
5	(Bolivia) Luis Aguilar & Adrian Jaldin Lobo	6	7	11	7
4	(Canada) Coby Iwaasa & Samuel Murray	11	11	6	11
3	(Mexico) Javier Mar & Rodrigo Montoya	11	11	11
6	(Dominican Republic) Luis Perez & Junior Rodriguez	4	3	6
10	(United States) Jake Bredenbeck & Sam Bredenbeck	11	11	11
2	(Costa Rica) Andrés Acuña & Felipe Segreda	5	9	8

Semifinals
1	(Ecuador) Juan Francisco Cueva & Jose Daniel Ugalde	9	11	2	5
4	(Canada) Coby Iwaasa & Samuel Murray	11	9	11	11
3	(Mexico) Javier Mar & Rodrigo Montoya	11	11	11
2	(United States) Jake Bredenbeck & Sam Bredenbeck	7	4	6

Final
4	(Canada) Coby Iwaasa & Samuel Murray	11	8	7	16	6
2	(Mexico) Javier Mar & Rodrigo Montoya	7	11	11	14	11

== Women's singles ==
=== Preliminary round ===
Group 1

Players	Pld	W	L	GW	GL	PW	PL	Place
(Mexico) Alexandra Herrera	3	3	0	9	0	102	41	1
(Costa Rica) Maricruz Ortiz	3	2	1	6	3	89	62	2
(Guatemala) Mariana Tobon Gordon	3	1	2	3	6	63	75	3
(Dominican Republic) Luz Moreta	3	0	3	0	9	23	99	4

Group 2

Players	Pld	W	L	GW	GL	PW	PL	Place
(Argentina) Maria Jose Vargas	3	3	0	9	0	99	60	1
(Costa Rica) Larissa Faeth	3	2	1	6	3	85	69	2
(Bolivia) Rebecca Amaya Ardaya	3	1	2	3	8	80	106	3
(Dominican Republic) Maria Cespedes	3	0	3	2	9	85	114	4

Group 3

Players	Pld	W	L	GW	GL	PW	PL	Place
(Mexico) Montserrat Mejia	3	3	0	9	1	107	41	1
(Chile) Carla Muñoz	3	2	1	7	3	93	56	2
(Canada) Chloe Jauvin	3	1	2	3	6	51	76	3
(Colombia) Valeria Salas	3	0	3	0	9	21	99	4

Group 4

Players	Pld	W	L	GW	GL	PW	PL	Place
(Guatemala) Gabriela Martinez	3	2	1	8	5	128	100	1
(Bolivia) Camila Rivero	3	2	1	7	4	107	99	2
(Argentina) Natalia Mendez	3	2	1	7	6	121	119	3
(United States) Annie Sanchez	3	0	3	2	9	83	121	4

Group 5

Players	Pld	W	L	GW	GL	PW	PL	Place
(United States) Lexi York	3	3	0	9	1	107	64	1
(Canada) Juliette Parent	3	2	1	7	5	115	104	2
(Guatemala) Andrea Gabriela Reyes Perez	3	1	2	5	6	88	95	3
(Chile) Paula Mansilla	3	0	3	0	9	56	103	4

=== Medal round ===
First Round
9	(Costa Rica) Maricruz Ortiz	12	13	11	6	15
8	(Chile) Carla Muñoz	10	15	5	11	17
7	(Bolivia) Camila Rivero	12	11	11
10	(Costa Rica) Larissa Faeth	10	5	5

Quarterfinals
1	(Mexico) Alexandra Herrera	11	11	11
8	(Chile) Carla Muñoz	7	5	9
5	(United States) Lexi York	11	7	5
4	(Guatemala) Gabriela Martinez	13	11	11
3	(Mexico) Montserrat Mejia	11	11	11
6	(Canada) Juliette Parent	7	3	3
7	(Bolivia) Camila Rivero	11	8	4	4
2	(Argentina) Maria Jose Vargas	7	11	11	11

Semifinals
1	(Mexico) Alexandra Herrera	6	10	8
4	(Guatemala) Gabriela Martinez	11	12	11
3	(Mexico) Montserrat Mejia	9	6	9
2	(Argentina) Maria Jose Vargas	11	11	11

Final
4	(Guatemala) Gabriela Martinez	9	15	7	11	9
2	(Argentina) Maria Jose Vargas	11	13	11	7	11

== Women's doubles ==
=== Preliminary round ===
Group 1

Players	Pld	W	L	GW	GL	PW	PL	Place
(Argentina) Valeria Centellas & Natalia Méndez	2	2	0	6	1	71	50	1
(Guatemala) Gabriela Martinez & Maria Renee Rodriguez	2	1	1	4	3	68	56	2
(Dominican Republic) Maria Cespedes & Alejandra Jimenez	3	0	2	0	6	35	68	3

Group 2

Players	Pld	W	L	GW	GL	PW	PL	Place
(Mexico) Alexandra Herrera & Montserrat Mejia	2	2	0	6	0	69	36	1
(Chile) Paula Mansilla & Carla Muñoz	2	1	1	3	3	54	62	2
(Canada) Chloe Jauvin & Marjolaine Parent	2	0	2	0	6	41	66	3

Group 3

Players	Pld	W	L	GW	GL	PW	PL	Place
(United States) Michelle Andersen & Lexi York	3	3	0	9	2	116	82	1
(Bolivia) Rebecca Amaya Ardaya & Camila Rivero	3	2	1	8	4	118	91	2
(Costa Rica) Larissa Faeth & Maricruz Ortiz	3	1	2	4	6	80	91	3
(Venezuela) Victoria Febres & Mariana Tobon Gordon	3	0	3	0	9	50	100	4

=== Medal round ===
First Round
9	(Venezuela) Victoria Febres & Mariana Tobon Gordon	11	11	11
8	(Dominican Republic) Maria Cespedes & Alejandra Jimenez	9	4	6
7	(Canada) Chloe Jauvin & Marjolaine Parent	4	11	6	4
10	(Costa Rica) Larissa Faeth & Maricruz Ortiz	11	9	11	11

Quarterfinals
1	(Argentina) Valeria Centellas & Maria Jose Vargas	11	11	11
9	(Venezuela) Victoria Febres & Mariana Tobon Gordon	2	8	7
5	(Chile) Paula Mansilla & Carla Muñoz	5	4	3
4	(Bolivia) Rebecca Amaya Ardaya & Camila Rivero	11	11	11
3	(United States) Michelle Andersen & Lexi York	6	11	11	8	3
6	(Guatemala) Gabriela Martinez & Maria Renee Rodriguez	11	9	9	11	11
10	(Costa Rica) Larissa Faeth & Maricruz Ortiz	8	4	6
2	(Mexico) Alexandra Herrera & Montserrat Mejia	11	11	11

Semifinals
1	(Argentina) Valeria Centellas & Maria Jose Vargas	11	5	5	11	11
4	(Bolivia) Rebecca Amaya Ardaya & Camila Rivero	9	11	11	4	6
6	(Guatemala) Gabriela Martinez & Maria Renee Rodriguez	14	8	7	8
2	(Mexico) Alexandra Herrera & Montserrat Mejia	12	11	11	11

Final
1	(Argentina) Valeria Centellas & Maria Jose Vargas	11	9	11	11
2	(Mexico) Alexandra Herrera & Montserrat Mejia	8	11	9	6

== Mixed doubles ==
Group 1

Players	Pld	W	L	GW	GL	PW	PL	Place
(Mexico) Andree Parrilla & Jessica Parrilla	3	3	0	9	2	105	81	1
(Chile) Carla Muñoz & Alan Natera	3	2	1	8	4	121	88	2
(Ecuador) Martin Carchi & Maria Angela Villacreses	3	1	2	4	7	97	108	3
(Venezuela) Carlos Marquez & Mariana Tobon Gordon	3	0	3	1	9	64	110	4

Group 2

Players	Pld	W	L	GW	GL	PW	PL	Place
(Costa Rica) Andrés Acuña & Larissa Faeth	3	3	0	9	3	110	103	1
(Argentina) Gerson Miranda Martinez & Natalia Mendez	3	2	1	7	5	115	111	2
(United States) Michelle Andersen & Erik Garcia	3	1	2	7	6	130	102	3
(Colombia) Set Cubillos & Valeria Salas	3	0	3	0	9	63	102	4

Group 3

Players	Pld	W	L	GW	GL	PW	PL	Place
(Bolivia) Rebecca Amaya Ardaya & Conrrado Moscoso	3	3	0	9	1	118	92	1
(Dominican Republic) Ramon De Leon & Alejandra Jimenez	3	1	2	5	6	106	106	2
(Guatemala) Maria Renee Rodriguez & Juan Salvatierra	3	1	2	3	6	78	85	3
(Canada) Lee Connell & Juliette Parent	3	1	2	4	8	114	133	4

=== Medal Round ===
First Round
9	(Guatemala) Maria Renee Rodriguez & Juan Salvatierra	8	9	11	12	11
8	(Ecuador) Martin Carchi & Maria Angela Villacreses	11	11	4	10	3
5	(Argentina) Natalia Mendez & Gerson Miranda Martinez	11	12	11
12	(Colombia) Set Cubillos & Valeria Salas	6	10	5
9	(Venezuela) Carlos Marquez & Mariana Tobon Gordon	6	4	2
8	(Chile) Carla Muñoz & Alan Natera	11	11	11
7	(United States) Michelle Andersen & Erik Garcia	11	11	11
10	(Canada) Lee Connell & Juliette Parent	6	8	6

Quarterfinals
1	(Mexico) Andree Parrilla & Jessica Parrilla	11	11	11
9	(Guatemala) Maria Renee Rodriguez & Juan Salvatierra	6	7	9
5	(Argentina) Natalia Mendez & Gerson Miranda Martinez	11	11	11
4	(Dominican Republic) Ramon De Leon & Alejandra Jimenez	8	6	6
3	(Bolivia) Rebecca Amaya Ardaya & Conrrado Moscoso	11	11	7	11
6	(Chile) Carla Muñoz & Alan Natera	8	4	11	7
7	(United States) Michelle Andersen & Erik Garcia	6	14	6	7
2	(Costa Rica) Andrés Acuña & Larissa Faeth	11	12	11	11

Semifinals
1	(Mexico) Andree Parrilla & Jessica Parrilla	10	11	11	5	7
5	(Argentina) Natalia Mendez & Gerson Miranda Martinez	10	11	11	5	11
3	(Bolivia) Rebecca Amaya Ardaya & Conrrado Moscoso	11	6	11	5	6
2	(Costa Rica) Andrés Acuña & Larissa Faeth	5	11	6	11	11

Final
5	(Argentina) Natalia Mendez & Gerson Miranda Martinez	8	8	15	7
2	(Costa Rica) Andrés Acuña & Larissa Faeth	11	11	13	11

== Team Competitions ==
=== Men's Team ===
First Round
9	Ecuador
8	Chile
5	Costa Rica
12	Colombia
5	Venezuela
12	(United States) USA
11	Cuba
6	Guatemala
7	Argentina
10	Dominican Republic

Quarterfinals
1	Bolivia
8	Chile
5	Costa Rica
4	(Argentina) USA
3	Mexico
11	Cuba
7	Argentina
2	Canada

Semifinals
1	Bolivia
4	(United States) USA
3	Mexico
7	Argentina

Final
1	Bolivia
3	Mexico

=== Women's Team ===
First Round
9	Dominican Republic
8	Canada
7	(United States) USA
10	Venezuela

Quarterfinals
1	Mexico
9	Dominican Republic
5	Bolivia
4	Guatemala
3	Costa Rica
6	Chile
7	(United States) USA
2	Argentina

Semifinals
1	Mexico
5	Bolivia
3	Costa Rica
2	Argentina

Final
1	Mexico
2	Argentina
