= Montserrat Mejía =

Mexican racquetball player

Personal information
- Nickname: Montse
- Nationality: Mexican
- Born: 4 December 1999 (age 26) San Luis Potosí City, Mexico
Medal record
Women's Racquetball
Representing Mexico
Pan American Games
Gold medal – first place	2023 Santiago	Team
Gold medal – first place	2023 Santiago	Doubles
Silver medal – second place	2023 Santiago	Singles
Gold medal – first place	2019 Lima	Women's team
World Championships
Gold medal – first place	2024 San Antonio	Doubles
Silver medal – second place	2024 San Antonio	Mixed Doubles
Gold medal – first place	2024 San Antonio	Team
Silver medal – second place	2018 San José	Doubles
Pan Am Championships
Bronze medal – third place	2026 Guatemala City	Singles
Silver medal – second place	2026 Guatemala City	Doubles
Silver medal – second place	2026 Guatemala City	Team
Gold medal – first place	2025 Guatemala City	Singles
Gold medal – first place	2025 Guatemala City	Team
Gold medal – first place	2023 Guatemala City	Singles
Gold medal – first place	2023 Guatemala City	Doubles
Central American and Caribbean Games
Gold medal – first place	2026 Santo Domingo	Doubles
Gold medal – first place	2026 Santo Domingo	Team
Bronze medal – third place	2023 San Salvador	Singles
Gold medal – first place	2023 San Salvador	Doubles
Gold medal – first place	2023 San Salvador	Team

Montserrat Mejía (born December 4, 1999) is a Mexican racquetball player. Mejía is the current World Champion in Women's Doubles (with Alexandra Herrera), and helped Mexico win gold in the Women's Team event at the 2024 World Championships in San Antonio, Texas. She's also the current Pan American Champion in Women's Singles and the Women's Team event. Mejia finished #1 on the Ladies Professional Racquetball Tour in 2022–23, becoming the second Mexican to do so after Paola Longoria.

== Junior years - 2013-2018 ==
Mejía first made the podium at the International Racquetball Federation (IRF) World Junior Championship in 2013 in Sucre, Bolivia, where she and Andrea Ramirez won Girls U14 Doubles. That year Mejía lost in the quarterfinals of singles to fellow Mexican Erin Rivera.

The next year Mejía and Ramirez were on top of the podium again at World Juniors, winning Girls U14 Doubles by defeating Bolivians Wanda Carjajal and Adriana Homsi, 6–15, 15–10, 11–9, in Cali, Colombia. But in singles, Carvajal beat Mejía in the semi-finals, 15–7, 15–5.

At 2015 World Juniors in Santo Domingo, Dominican Republic, Mejía lost in the semi-finals of Girls U16 Singles to Jordan Cooperrider (USA), 15–5, 15–11. She and Ramirez finished 2nd in Girls U16 Doubles after losing to Cooperrider and Erika Manilla.

In 2016, Mejía lost to Gabriela Martinez of Guatemala in the final of Girls U16 Singles at the World Junior Championships in San Luis Potosi, Mexico, 15–13, 15–7. But she won Girls U16 Doubles with Ana Laura Flores.

Mejía won both singles and doubles at the 2017 World Junior Championships in Minneapolis, defeating Guatemalan Gabriela Martinez in the final of Girls U18 Singles, 15–13, 4–15, 11–5, and taking the U18 doubles title with Denisse Maldonado.

Mejía and Martinez again met in the final of Girls U18 Singles the following year at the 2018 World Junior Championships in San Luis Potosi, Mexico, where Mejía successfully defended the title, 15–14, 8–15, 11–6.

== First appearances for Mexico - 2018-2022 ==
Mejía first played internationally for Mexico at the 2018 Racquetball World Championships in San José, Costa Rica, where she and Alexandra Herrera played Women's Doubles. They reached the final by defeating Colombians Cristina Amaya and Adriana Riveros, 15–8, 15–4, but lost the final to Bolivians Valeria Centellas and Yasmine Sabja, 8–15, 15–14, 11–2.

The following year Mejía played at the 2019 Pan American Games in Lima, Peru. She played singles there, and made it to the medal round, losing to Ecuador's Maria Paz Muñoz, 15–14, 7–15, 11–5, in the Round of 16. But she helped Mexico to win the women's team title, as they defeated the US in the semi-finals and Argentina in the final.

== Winning gold for Mexico & becoming LPRT #1 - 2023-current ==
Mejía won gold in both singles and doubles at the 2023 Pan American Racquetball Championships. In singles, Mejía defeated Guatemalan Gabriela Martínez in the quarterfinals, 11–13, 11–8, 11–9, 11–7, Argentine Natalia Mendez in the semi-finals, 11–4, 11–5, 8–11, 11–5, and in the final Argentina's Maria Jose Vargas, 11–8, 11–6, 11–9. In doubles, Mejía and Alexandra Herrera won gold by defeating Guatemalans Gabriela Martinez and Maria Renee Rodriguez in the final, 11–6, 11–6, 12–10.

Mejía finished the 2022-23 Ladies Professional Racquetball Tour season on top of the rankings, which was her first #1 ranking and broke the 11-year run of Paola Longoria. She did it with a win at the last LPRT event of the season, beating Maria Jose Vargas in the final of the LPRT Battle at the Beach Season Finale, 15–7, 3–15, 11–3. That was her 5th win of the season.

Mejía competed at the 2023 Central American and Caribbean Games, and won three medals. She got a bronze medal in singles, as she lost in the semi-finals to Gabriela Martinez, 11–9, 13–11, 7–11, 11–6. But Mejía won gold in both doubles and the women's team event. In the doubles final, she and Alexandra Herrera came back from two games down to defeat Martinez and Maria Renee Rodriguez, 9–11, 8–11, 11–7, 13–11, 11–6.

Mejía and Alexandra Herrera won gold in Women's Doubles at the 2024 World Championships in San Antonio, Texas. They defeated Guatemalans Gabriela Martinez and Maria Renee Rodriguez in the semi-finals, 11–4, 12–10, 11–9, and Argentina's Natalia Mendez and Maria Jose Vargas in the final, 11–3, 9–11, 15–13, 7–11, 11–7. She also helped Mexico win the Women's Team title, as they defeated the US in the semi-finals and Argentina in the final.

Mejía also competed in singles and mixed doubles at Worlds. In Women's Singles, she lost to Guatemalan Gabriela Martinez, in the quarterfinals, 11–3, 11–2, 23–21. Mejía teamed up with Javier Mar in mixed doubles, and they reached the final by defeating Bolivians Angélica Barrios and Conrrado Moscoso in the semi-finals, 11–6, 9–11, 10–12, 11–7, 11–9, but lost the final to Americans Daniel De La Rosa and Hollie Scott, 11–9, 10–12, 11–9, 14–12.

Her success with Alexandra Herrera at Worlds led to them being named World Games Athletes of the Month for August 2024.

Mejia got two medals at the 2026 Central American and Caribbean Games in Santo Domingo, Dominican Republic. In Women's Singles, she was upset in the quarterfinals by Larissa Faeth of Costa Rica, 11–7, 11–13, 11–6, 11–7. But Mejia and Alexandra Herrera won Women's Doubles, by defeating Guatemalans Gabriela Martinez and Maria Renee Rodiguez in the final, 11–8, 11–4, 11–6. They also won the Women's Team final against Guatemala, as Mejia defeated Rodriguez, 11–7, 11–5, 11–7, and she and Herrera again defeated Martinez and Rodriguez, 11–4, 11–6, 11–9. Overall, Mejia has won five medals at the Central American and Caribbean Games: four gold and one bronze.

== Career summary ==
Mejía has been successful both internationally for Mexico and on the Ladies Professional Racquetball Tour, winning six events in her career, and becoming the LPRT's #1 player in 2023.

=== Career record ===
This table lists Mejía's results across annual events.

Event	2015	2016	2017	2018	2019	2020	2021	2022	2023	2024
US Open Singles	32	16	16	16	SF	16	P	-		
US Open Doubles	F	F	Q	F	W	F	P	-		
LPRT Rank	29	21	13	17	17	7	3	10	1	3

Note: W = winner, F = finalist, SF = semi-finalist, QF = quarterfinalist, 16 = Round of 16, 32 = Round of 32, 64 = Round of 64, 128 = Round of 128. P = Cancelled due to COVID pandemic.

== See also ==
- List of racquetball players

Sporting positions
Preceded by Paola Longoria	Number 1 Women's Pro Racquetball Player; 2022-2023	Succeeded by Maria Jose Vargas
