= Samantha Salas =

Mexican racquetball player

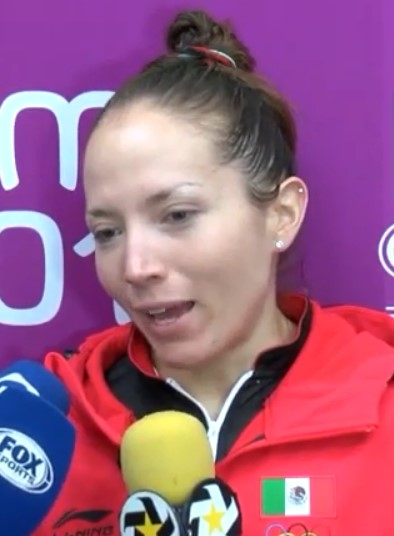
- Salas in 2019

Personal information
- Full name: Samantha Salas Solís
- Born: 15 December 1986 (age 39) León, Guanajuato, Mexico
Medal record
Women's Racquetball
Representing Mexico
Pan American Games
Gold medal – first place	2019 Lima	Women's doubles
Gold medal – first place	2019 Lima	Women's team
Gold medal – first place	2015 Toronto	Women's doubles
Gold medal – first place	2015 Toronto	Women's team
Gold medal – first place	2011 Guadalajara	Women's doubles
Gold medal – first place	2011 Guadalajara	Women's team
World Championships
Gold medal – first place	2022 San Luis Potosi	Doubles
Gold medal – first place	2022 San Luis Potosi	Mixed
Gold medal – first place	2022 San Luis Potosi	Team
Gold medal – first place	2021 Guatemala City	Doubles
Silver medal – second place	2016 Cali	Doubles
Bronze medal – third place	2016 Cali	Singles
Gold medal – first place	2014 Burlington	Doubles
Bronze medal – third place	2014 Burlington	Singles
Gold medal – first place	2012 Santo Domingo	Doubles
Gold medal – first place	2012 Santo Domingo	Team
Gold medal – first place	2010 Seoul	Doubles
Pan Am Championships
Silver medal – second place	2025 Guatemala City	Doubles
Bronze medal – third place	2025 Guatemala City	Mixed Doubles
Gold medal – first place	2025 Guatemala City	Team
Gold medal – first place	2022 Santa Cruz	Mixed Doubles
Silver medal – second place	2022 Santa Cruz	Doubles
Silver medal – second place	2022 Santa Cruz	Team
Gold medal – first place	2019 Barranquilla	Doubles
Bronze medal – third place	2018 Temuco	Singles
Gold medal – first place	2017 San Jose	Doubles
Bronze medal – third place	2017 San Jose	Singles
Gold medal – first place	2016 San Luis Potosi	Doubles
Gold medal – first place	2015 Santo Domingo	Doubles
Gold medal – first place	2014 Santa Cruz	Doubles
Bronze medal – third place	2014 Santa Cruz	Singles
Silver medal – second place	2013 Cali	Doubles
Bronze medal – third place	2013 Cali	Singles
Gold medal – first place	2012 Temuco	Doubles
Gold medal – first place	2011 Managua	Doubles
Silver medal – second place	2011 Managua	Singles
Gold medal – first place	2010 San Pedro Sula	Doubles
Silver medal – second place	2009 Cali	Doubles
Central American and Caribbean Games
Gold medal – first place	2018 Barranquilla	Doubles
Gold medal – first place	2018 Barranquilla	Team
Gold medal – first place	2014 Veracruz	Doubles
Silver medal – second place	2014 Veracruz	Singles
Gold medal – first place	2014 Veracruz	Team
Gold medal – first place	2010 Mayagüez	Doubles
Gold medal – first place	2010 Mayagüez	Team
Gold medal – first place	2006 Cartagena	Doubles
Gold medal – first place	2006 Cartagena	Team

Samantha Salas Solís (Note: In this Spanish name, the first or paternal surname is Salas and the second or maternal family name is Solís.) (born 15 December 1986) is a Mexican racquetball player. Salas has won six World Championship titles in her career - five in Women's Doubles (all with Paola Longoria) and one in Mixed Doubles (with Rodrigo Montoya). She has also won six Pan American Games gold medals: three in Women's Doubles and three in the women's team event. Salas was the second Mexican woman to finish in the top 10 rankings on the women's pro tour, doing so at the end of the 2006–07 season. Salas was ranked 3rd at the end of the 2019-20 Ladies Professional Racquetball Tour (LPRT) season, which was her tenth season in the top 10.

== Professional career ==
Salas won her first women's pro event in Olympia, Washington November 2010 in only her second pro final. In 2010–11, she reached the semi-finals or better in nine of the ten pro tournaments, including a semi-final finish at the 2010 US Open, which all led to her career high rank of No. 3 at season's end.

In 2011–12, Salas only played the first two events, and then suffered a right shoulder injury that caused her to miss the rest of the season, but she returned to the tour in 2012–13, and equaled her career best by finishing 3rd at the end of the 2012–13 season.

Salas won her second LPRT title in June 2017 in Guadalajara, Mexico, where she came back from two games down to defeat Paola Longoria in the semi-finals, and then beat Rhonda Rajsich in the final. Salas then had shoulder surgery again, and was out of action until 2018.

But shortly after her return to the LPRT, Salas won her third career title at the 2018 Battle at the Alamo in San Antonio in April. Salas played Longoria in that final, and as in Guadalajara, found herself down 0–2, but she came back to win, 5–11, 5–11, 11–9, 11–9, 11–4.

== International career ==
Playing for Mexico, Salas has been a gold medalist 11 times, including three World Championships in doubles with Paola Longoria. They won at the 2010 World Championships defeating then defending champions Jackie Paraiso and Aimee Ruiz of the US to capture the first women's doubles championship for Mexico and only the second title for a non-American team. Salas and Longoria have won two more titles: in 2012, when they also won the women's team title, and in 2014 Salas was also a bronze medalist in singles in 2014, losing to Rhonda Rajsich in the semi-finals.

Salas has won five Pan American Champion in women's doubles, winning in 2011, 2012 and 2015 with Longoria, and in 2010 and 2014 with Susana Acosta.

Salas also won gold at the 2011 Pan American Games in Guadalajara, Mexico in both the women's doubles (with Longoria) and the women's team events. Finally, she and Nancy Enriquez won gold at the 2006 Central American and Caribbean Games.

At the 2017 Pan American Championships, Salas won Women's Doubles with Longoria, as they defeated Veronica Sotomayor and Maria Paz Muñoz of Ecuador, 15–12, 15–5, in the final, and she was a bronze medalist in Women's Singles, losing to American Rhonda Rajsich in the semi-finals.

Salas played Women's Singles at the 2018 Pan American Championships in Temuco, Chile, where she was a bronze medalist, as she lost to team-mate Longoria in the semi-finals, 15–12, 15–6.

As a junior player, Salas won the International Racquetball Federation (IRF) World Junior Championship in Girls U18 in 2004.

== See also ==
- List of racquetball players
