= 2017 in racquetball =

This topic lists the racquetball events for 2017.

== World and continental events ==
- April 8–15: 2017 Pan American Racquetball Championships in (Costa Rica) San José
  - Men's: (Mexico) Alejandro Landa defeated (United States) Charlie Pratt, 15–10, 15–11.
  - Women's: (United States) Rhonda Rajsich defeated (Mexico) Paola Longoria, 7–15, 15–13, 11–9.
  - Men's Doubles: (Mexico) Alejandro Landa & (Mexico) Polo Gutierrez defeated (United States) David Horn & (United States) Jake Bredenbeck, 10–15, 15–8, 11–4.
  - Women's Doubles: (Mexico) Paola Longoria & (Mexico) Samantha Salas defeated (Ecuador) Veronica Sotomayor & (Ecuador) María Paz Muñoz, 15–12, 15–5.

== 2016–17 International racquetball tour ==
- September 8–11: Novasors Ghost of Georgetown Kansas City Open in Kansas City
  - Singles: (Canada) Kane Waselenchuk defeated (United States) Rocky Carson, 11–4, 11–2, 11–0.
- October 5–9: US Open Racquetball Championships in (Minnesota) Minneapolis
  - Singles: (Canada) Kane Waselenchuk defeated (United States) Rocky Carson, 11–2, 11–2, 11–6.
  - Doubles: (United States) Jose Rojas & (United States) Marco Rojas defeated (Mexico) Daniel de la Rosa & (Mexico) Edson Martinez, 15–10, 15–5.
- November 3–6: Galaxy Custom Printing IRT Pro/Am in (Georgia (U.S. state)) Lilburn
  - Singles: (Canada) Kane Waselenchuk defeated (Mexico) Daniel de la Rosa, by injury forfeit.
  - Doubles: (United States) Charlie Pratt & (United States) Jansen Allen defeated (United States) Alejandro Landa & (Canada) Samuel Murray, 15–13, 9–15, 11–6.
- November 17–20: St. Louis Pro Racquetball Winter Rollout in (Missouri) St. Louis
  - Singles: (Canada) Kane Waselenchuk defeated (United States) Rocky Carson, 11–6, 11–4, 11–1.
- December 1–4: Monterey Open in (Mexico) Monterrey
  - Singles: (Mexico) Álvaro Beltrán defeated (Mexico) Edson Martinez, 11–7, 7–11, 11–2, 1–11, 11–7.
- January 5–8: Coast to Coast California Open in Oakridge
  - Singles: (Canada) Kane Waselenchuk defeated (United States) Rocky Carson, 11–7, 11–3, 11–9.
- January 19–22: Lewis Drug Pro/Am in (South Dakota) Sioux Falls
  - Singles: (Mexico) Daniel de la Rosa defeated (Mexico) Álvaro Beltrán, 11–9, 11–4, 11–7.
  - Doubles: (Mexico) Álvaro Beltrán & (Mexico) Daniel de la Rosa defeated (United States) Jose Diaz & (United States) Rocky Carson, 15–12, 15–14.
- March 16–19: Shamrock Shootout IRT ProAm in (Illinois) Chicago
  - Singles: (Canada) Kane Waselenchuk defeated (Mexico) Andree Parrilla, 11–1, 11–4, 12–10.
- March 23–26: Raising Some Racquet for Kids IRT ProAm in (Ohio) Dayton
  - Singles: (United States) Rocky Carson defeated (Mexico) Daniel de la Rosa, 12–10, 11–9, 9–11, 11–8.
- April 27–30: Florida IRT Pro/Am in Sarasota (final)
  - Singles: (Canada) Kane Waselenchuk defeated (United States) Rocky Carson, 11–8, 11–8, 11–2.

== 2016–17 Ladies professional racquetball tour ==
August 12 – June 4: 2016–17 Ladies Professional Racquetball Tour

- August 12–14, 2016: LPRT Atlanta Singles & Doubles Championships in (Georgia (U.S. state)) Atlanta
  - Single: (Canada) Frédérique Lambert defeated (Mexico) Alexandra Herrera, 11–6, 11–3, 11–9.
  - Doubles: (United States) Jordan Cooperrider / (Mexico) Alexandra Herrera defeated (United States) Regina Franco / (Mexico) Maritza Franco, 15–4, 15–9.
- September 2–4: The Paola Longoria Experience in (Mexico) San Luis Potosí City
  - Singles: (Mexico) Paola Longoria defeated (Canada) Frédérique Lambert, 11–3, 11–3, 11–1.
  - Doubles: (Mexico) Samantha Salas & (Mexico) Paola Longoria defeated (Guatemala) Gabriela Martinez & (Mexico) Monserrat Mejia, 14–15, 15–4, 11–3.
- September 9–11: Sweet Caroline Open in (South Carolina) Greenville
  - Singles: (Mexico) Paola Longoria defeated (Canada) Frédérique Lambert, 12–10, 11–1, 6–11, 11–4.
  - Doubles: (Bolivia) Adriana Riveros & (Mexico) Paola Longoria defeated (Mexico) Alexandra Herrera & (Canada) Frédérique Lambert, 15–14, 15–12.
- September 21–25: WOR – 3 WallBall in (Nevada) Las Vegas (outdour)
  - Singles: (United States) Janel Tisinger defeated (United States) Michelle Key, 15–4, 15–11.
  - Doubles: (United States) Aimee Ruiz & (United States) Janel Tisinger defeated (United States) Michelle Key & (Mexico) Paola Longoria, 15–8, 6–15, 11–10.
- October 5–9: US Open Racquetball Championships in (Minnesota) Minneapolis
  - Singles: (Mexico) Paola Longoria defeated (Mexico) Samantha Salas, 11–3, 11–7, 11–3.
  - Doubles: (Mexico) Paola Longoria & (Mexico) Samantha Salas defeated (Canada) Frédérique Lambert & (Ecuador) Veronica Sotomayor, 15–10, 15–0.
- October 28–30: Boston Open in (Massachusetts) Boston
  - Singles: (Mexico) Paola Longoria defeated (Canada) Frédérique Lambert, 11–3, 11–3, 11–4.
  - Doubles: (Mexico) Paola Longoria & (United States) Rhonda Rajsich defeated (Canada) Frédérique Lambert & (Mexico) Jessica Parrilla, 15–2, 15–12.
- November 4–6: The Paola Longoria Invitational in (Mexico) Monterrey
  - Singles: (Mexico) Paola Longoria defeated (Canada) Frédérique Lambert, 13–11, 11–9, 14–12.
  - Doubles: (Mexico) Paola Longoria & (Mexico) Samantha Salas defeated (Canada) Frédérique Lambert & (Mexico) Jessica Parrilla, 15–4, 12–15, 11–2.
- November 18–20: KipSplat Open in (Washington (state)) Bremerton
  - Singles: (Mexico) Paola Longoria defeated (Mexico) Alexandra Herrera, 11–4, 11–5, 12–10.
- December 9–11: Christmas Classic (Maryland) Severna Park
  - Singles: (Mexico) Paola Longoria defeated (Canada) Frédérique Lambert, 11–2, 11–3, 10–12, 11–1.
  - Doubles: (Mexico) Paola Longoria & (Mexico) Samantha Salas defeated (Canada) Frédérique Lambert & (Mexico) Jessica Parrilla, 10–15, 15–9, 11–7.
- March 3–5: New Jersey Open in Warren
  - Singles: (Mexico) Paola Longoria defeated (Colombia) Cristina Amaya, 11–4, 11–2, 11–4.
  - Doubles: (Guatemala) Gabriela Martinez & (Mexico) Paola Longoria defeated (United States) Rhonda Rajsich & (United States) Sheryl Lotts, 15–11, 15–3.
- March 31 – April 2: WOR – AZ WOR VII in (Arizona) Glendale
  - No women's competition here, satellite competition
- April 21–23: Battle at the Alamo in (Texas) San Antonio
  - Singles: (Mexico) Paola Longoria defeated (Mexico) Samantha Salas, 11–9, 11–7, 7–11, 11–4.
  - Doubles: (Mexico) Paola Longoria & (Mexico) Samantha Salas defeated (Mexico) Jessica Parrilla & (Chile) Carla Muñoz, 15–5, 15–8.
- May 5–7: Paola Longoria Open in (Mexico) Guadalajara
  - Singles: (Mexico) Paola Longoria defeated (Mexico) Samantha Salas, 11–0, 12–10, 11–3.
  - Doubles: (Canada) Frédérique Lambert & (Mexico) Jessica Parrilla defeated (Mexico) Alexandra Herrera & (Mexico) Monserrat Mejia, 15–12, 11–15, 11–5.
- June 16–18: Paola Longoria Challenge (final) in (Mexico) Mérida
  - Singles: (Mexico) Samantha Salas defeated (United States) Rhonda Rajsich, 11–3, 11–6, 11–6.
  - Doubles: (Mexico) Paola Longoria & (Mexico) Samantha Salas defeated (Mexico) Alexandra Herrera & (Mexico) Monserrat Mejia, 15–1, 15–6.
