= Racquetball at the 2015 Pan American Games – Men's singles =

Racquetball – Men's singles at the 2015 Pan American Games
- Venue: Exhibition Centre – Hall C
- Dates: July 19 - July 24
- Competitors: 20 from 10 nations

Medalists
Gold medal	Rocky Carson	United States
Silver medal	Álvaro Beltrán	Mexico
Bronze medal	Daniel De La Rosa	Mexico
Bronze medal	Conrrado Moscoso	Bolivia

The men's singles competition of the racquetball events at the 2015 Pan American Games will be held from July 19–24 at the Direct Energy Centre (Exhibition Centre), in Toronto, Canada. The defending Pan American Games champion is Rocky Carson of the United States.

== Schedule ==
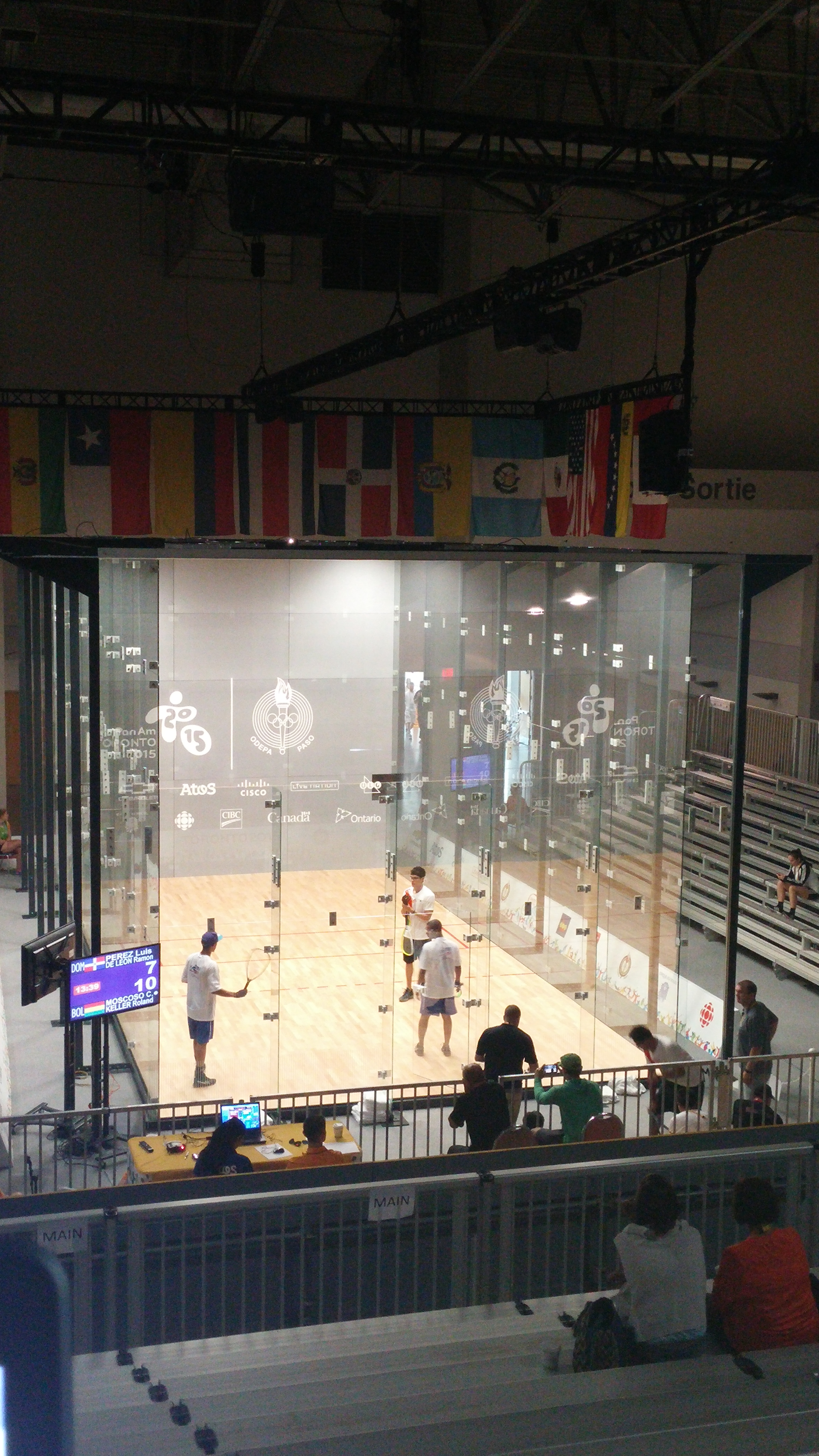
The Direct Energy Centre (Exhibition Centre), Hall C, was the venue for the racquetball competitions

All times are Central Standard Time (UTC-6).

Date	Time	Round
July 19, 2015	9:05	Round Robin
July 20, 2015	9:05	Round Robin
July 21, 2015	9:05	Round Robin
July 22, 2015	10:00	First Round
July 22, 2015	16:00	Second Round
July 23, 2015	10:00	Quarterfinals
July 23, 2015	18:00	Semifinals
July 24, 2015	10:50	Final

== Round robin ==
The round robin will be used as a qualification round. Groups was announced at the technical meeting the day before the competition begins.

=== Pool A ===
Player	Nation	Pld	W	L	Points
Rocky Carson	United States	3	3	0	6
Felipe Camacho	Costa Rica	3	2	1	5
Jose Alvarez	Ecuador	3	1	2	4
Cesar Castro	Venezuela	3	0	3	3

=== Pool B ===
Player	Nation	Pld	W	L	Points
Carlos Keller	Bolivia	3	2	1	5
Andres Acuña	Costa Rica	3	2	1	5
Edwin Galicia	Guatemala	3	1	2	4
Fernando Rios	Ecuador	3	1	2	3

=== Pool C ===
Player	Nation	Pld	W	L	Points
Jake Bredenbeck	United States	3	3	0	5
Luis Pérez	Dominican Republic	3	2	1	5
Cesar Castillo	Venezuela	3	1	2	4
Set De Jesus Cubillos	Colombia	3	0	3	3

=== Pool D ===
Player	Nation	Pld	W	L	Points
Daniel De La Rosa	Mexico	3	3	0	6
Conrrado Moscoso	Bolivia	3	2	1	5
Coby Iwaasa	Canada	3	1	2	4
Christian Wer	Guatemala	3	0	3	3

=== Pool E ===
Player	Nation	Pld	W	L	Points
Álvaro Beltrán	Mexico	3	3	0	6
Alejandro Herrera	Colombia	3	2	1	5
Michael Green	Canada	3	1	2	4
Ramón de León	Dominican Republic	3	0	3	3

== Playoffs ==
=== Finals ===
Semifinals			Final
Rocky Carson (USA)	15	15
Daniel De La Rosa (MEX)	14	8	Rocky Carson (USA)	15	15
Álvaro Beltrán (MEX)	15	15	Álvaro Beltrán (MEX)	11	10
Conrrado Moscoso (BOL)	9	3

=== Top half ===
First Round
Christian Wer (GUA)	12	15	9
Ramón de León (DOM)	15	8	11
Cesar Castillo (VEN)	15	15
Cesar Castro (VEN)	1	4

Second Round
Rocky Carson (USA)	15	15
Ramón de León (DOM)	2	4
Andres Acuña (CRC)	12	15	4
Luis Pérez (DOM)	15	9	11
Alejandro Herrera (COL)	15	15
Edwin Galicia (GUA)	11	1
Cesar Castillo (VEN)	13	3
Daniel De La Rosa (MEX)	15	15

Quarterfinals
Rocky Carson (USA)	15	15
Luis Pérez (DOM)	8	1
Alejandro Herrera (COL)	4	14
Daniel De La Rosa (MEX)	15	15

Semifinals
Rocky Carson (USA)	15	15
Daniel De La Rosa (MEX)	14	8

=== Bottom half ===
First Round
Fernando Rios (ECU)
Coby Iwaasa (CAN)	WO
Michael Green (CAN)	15	15
Jet De Jesus Cubillos (COL)	4	4

Second Round
Jake Bredenbeck (USA)	4	9
Coby Iwaasa (CAN)	15	15
Jose Alvarez (ECU)	15	2	6
Álvaro Beltrán (MEX)	14	15	11
Conrrado Moscoso (BOL)	15	15
Felipe Camacho (CRC)	11	9
Michael Green (CAN)	15	6	0
Carlos Keller (BOL)	11	15	11

Quarterfinals
Coby Iwaasa (CAN)	3	7
Álvaro Beltrán (MEX)	15	15
Conrrado Moscoso (BOL)	15	15
Carlos Keller (BOL)	3	5

Semifinals
Álvaro Beltrán (MEX)	15	15
Conrrado Moscoso (BOL)	9	3
