= Jansen Allen =

American racquetball player

Personal information
- Nationality: American
- Born: July 24, 1989 (age 37) Corsicana, Texas

Sport
- Sport: Racquetball
- College team: Colorado State-Pueblo
- Turned pro: 2012

Achievements and titles
- National finals: 1st 2013, 2015 (doubles)
Medal record
Men's racquetball
Representing United States
World Championships
| Silver medal – second place | 2012 Santo Domingo | Doubles |
| Gold medal – first place | 2012 Santo Domingo | Team |
Pan American Championships
| Silver medal – second place | 2011 Managua | Doubles |
| Silver medal – second place | 2013 Cali | Doubles |
Pan American Games
| Gold medal – first place | 2015 Toronto | Doubles |
| Silver medal – second place | 2015 Toronto | Team |

Jansen Allen (born July 24, 1989) is an American racquetball player. Allen won gold at the 2015 Pan American Games in Men's Doubles with Jose Rojas. He was ranked in the top 10 on the International Racquetball Tour for five straight seasons, from 2013–14 to 2017–18. Allen also a 5 Time Junior National Champion, the 2012 Division 1 Collegiate racquetball champion in singles and doubles, and a 5 Time Texas State Champion.

== International career ==
Allen has represented the USA four times internationally. His first appearance was in 2011 at the Pan American Championships in Managua, Nicaragua, where he played doubles with Tony Carson. They defeated Canadians Mike Green and Kris Odegard in the semi-finals, but in the final, they lost to Mexicans Javier Moreno and Polo Gutierrez.

In 2012, Allen and Carson were runners up in Men's Doubles at the World Championships in Santo Domingo, Dominican Republic, as they lost the final to Mexicans Moreno and Álvaro Beltrán. They did win gold in the Men's Team competition in Santo Domingo, as the USA defeated Canada in the final.

Allen played both Men's Singles and Men's Doubles at the 2013 Pan American Championships in Santa Cruz, Bolivia. In Men's Singles he lost in the Round of 16 to Bolivia. But in Men's Doubles, Allen and Marco Rojas made the podium as silver medalists after they lost to Mexico in the final.

His most recent appearance was at the 2015 Pan American Games in Toronto, where he won gold in Men's doubles with Jose Rojas. They defeated Mexicans Moreno and Beltran in semi-finals, and then in the semi-finals, they beat Bolivians Conrrado Moscoso and Roland Keller. Also, Allen and his teammates Rojas were silver medalists in the Men's Team competition.

== Professional career ==
Jansen Allen was in the top 10 of the International Racquetball Tour for five consecutive seasons beginning in 2013–14. His highest ranking was #5 at the end of the 2017–18 season.

He hasn't been in an IRT final yet, but has been in the semi-finals four times. Allen's first semi-final appearance was in November 2014 at the 24th Annual Turkey Shootout in Garden City, Kansas, where he lost to Rocky Carson. His other two semis were also against Carson. Allen lost to Carson in January 2016 at the New York City Open, and in September 2016 at the Ghost of Georgetown in Overland Park, Kansas.

== US Championships ==
Allen and Rojas won the USA Racquetball Men's Doubles championship in 2015. The win qualified them for the 2015 Pan American Games team.

Allen and Carson won the 2013 USA Doubles Championship by defeating Chris Crowther and Cliff Swain in the final. Allen and Carson came into the 2014 USA Doubles Championship as the top seeds, because they were the defending champions in 2013 but lost in the semi-finals that year.

Intercollegiate Championships. Allen attended Colorado State University in Pueblo, and he won the Men's Division 1 singles at the 2012 USA Racquetball Intercollegiate Championships, defeating Taylor Knoth, as well as Men's Doubles with Nick Montalbano. Allen won two other intercollegiate titles both in Men's Doubles. In 2011, he and Felipe Camacho won Men's Doubles, and in 2009, Allen and Tony Carson won.

== Personal life ==
Allen graduated from Colorado State University-Pueblo with a B.S. degree in Finance and Management, and then went on to get an M.B.A. degree from Texas A&M University.

He currently lives in Dallas, Texas, and recently married Paige Allen, an accountant.

== See also ==
- List of racquetball players
