= 2022 Racquetball World Championships – Men's doubles =

Men's doubles at the XXI Racquetball World Championships
- Location: San Luis Potosí, Mexico
- Dates: August 20–27

Medalists
gold medal	(Mexico) Álvaro Beltrán & Daniel de la Rosa
silver medal	(Bolivia) Roland Keller & Conrrado Moscoso
bronze medal	(United States) Sam Bredenbeck & Charlie Pratt (Canada) Coby Iwaasa & Samuel Murray

The International Racquetball Federation's 21st Racquetball World Championships was held in San Luis Potosí, Mexico from August 20–27, 2022. This was the first time the World Championships was held in Mexico since 2000, when it was also held in San Luis Potosí.

The 2022 World Championships used a best of five games match format with each game to 11 points, win by 2, with rally scoring, as used in other sports like squash and volleyball. Previously, racquetball games used side-out scoring, where players scored points only when they had won a rally which began with that player serving. Rallies won when not serving were simply side-outs: the rally losing player lost the serve and the rally winning player won the opportunity to serve, but did not win a point.

Mexicans Álvaro Beltrán and Daniel de la Rosa won the division for the second time together; the first was in 2018. This was Beltran's fifth men's doubles World Championship, having won the others with Javier Moreno. The Mexicans defeated Bolivians Roland Keller and Conrrado Moscoso in the final, 7–11, 12–14, 11–7, 11–5, 11–6.

== Tournament format ==
The 2022 World Championships used a two-stage format to determine the World Champions. Initially, players competed in separate groups over three days. The results were used to seed players for the medal round.

== Men's doubles ==
Group A

Players	Pld	W	L	GW	GL	PW	PL	Points
(Mexico) Álvaro Beltrán & Daniel de la Rosa	3	3	0	9	1	107	60	6
(Costa Rica) Andrés Acuña & Sergio Acuña	3	2	1	6	4	90	70	5
(Ecuador) Juan Francisco Cueva & Jose Daniel Ugalde	3	1	2	5	6	92	94	4
(Cuba) Yandy Espinosa & Maikel Moyet	3	0	3	0	9	34	99	3

Group B

Players	Pld	W	L	GW	GL	PW	PL	Points
(Bolivia) Roland Keller & Conrrado Moscoso	3	3	0	6	3	101	49	6
(Argentina) Diego Garcia & Tomás Oyhanart	3	2	1	6	3	87	69	5
(Japan) Yuki Nakano & Hiroshi Shimizu	3	1	2	3	6	68	87	4
(India) Ravi Ranjan & Vineet Singh	3	0	3	0	9	49	100	3

Group C

Players	Pld	W	L	GW	GL	PW	PL	Points
(Canada) Coby Iwaasa & Samuel Murray	3	3	0	9	2	115	71	6
(United States) Sam Bredenbeck & Charles Pratt	3	2	1	6	3	90	60	5
(Guatemala) Edwin Galicia & Christian Wer	3	1	2	5	7	93	110	4
(Chile) Diego Gatica & Jaime Mansilla	3	0	3	1	9	50	107	3

=== Medal round ===
First round
9	(Guatemala) Edwin Galicia & Christian Wer	11	5	11	8	8
8	(Ecuador) Juan Francisco Cueva & Jose Daniel Ugalde	8	11	5	11	11
5	(Argentina) Diego Garcia & Tomás Oyhanart	7	11	5	7
12	(Cuba) Yandy Espinosa & Maikel Moyet	11	8	11	11
11	(India) Ravi Ranjan & Vineet Singh	5	3	3
6	(Costa Rica) Andrés Acuña & Sergio Acuña	11	11	11
7	(Japan) Yuki Nakano & Hiroshi Shimizu	4	12	11	11	10
10	(Chile) Diego Gatica & Jaime Mansilla	11	14	6	6	12

Quarterfinals
1	(Mexico) Álvaro Beltrán & Daniel de la Rosa	11	11	11
8	(Ecuador) Juan Francisco Cueva & Jose Daniel Ugalde	7	8	7
12	(Cuba) Yandy Espinosa & Maikel Moyet	6	10	5
4	(United States) Sam Bredenbeck & Charles Pratt	11	12	11
3	(Canada) Coby Iwaasa & Samuel Murray	11	12	11
6	(Costa Rica) Andrés Acuña & Sergio Acuña	3	10	8
10	(Chile) Diego Gatica & Jaime Mansilla	2	7	5
2	(Bolivia) Roland Keller & Conrrado Moscoso	11	11	11

Semifinals
1	(Mexico) Álvaro Beltrán & Daniel de la Rosa	12	11	11
4	(United States) Sam Bredenbeck & Charles Pratt	10	9	7
3	(Canada) Coby Iwaasa & Samuel Murray	8	6	11	9
2	(Bolivia) Roland Keller & Conrrado Moscoso	11	11	1	11

Final
1	(Mexico) Álvaro Beltrán & Daniel de la Rosa	7	12	11	11	11
2	(Bolivia) Roland Keller & Conrrado Moscoso	11	14	7	5	6
