= Racquetball at the 2015 Pan American Games – Men's doubles =

Racquetball – Men's doubles at the 2015 Pan American Games
- Venue: Exhibition Centre – Hall C
- Dates: July 19 - July 24
- Competitors: 22 from 11 nations

Medalists
Gold medal	Jansen Allen; Jose Rojas	United States
Silver medal	Conrrado Moscoso; Roland Keller	Bolivia
Bronze medal	Álvaro Beltrán; Javier Moreno	Mexico
Bronze medal	Vincent Gagnon; Tim Landeryou	Canada

The men's doubles competition of the racquetball events at the 2015 Pan American Games was held from July 19–24 at the Direct Energy Centre (Exhibition Centre), in Toronto, Canada. The defending Pan American Games champion is Álvaro Beltrán and Javier Moreno of the Mexico.

== Schedule ==
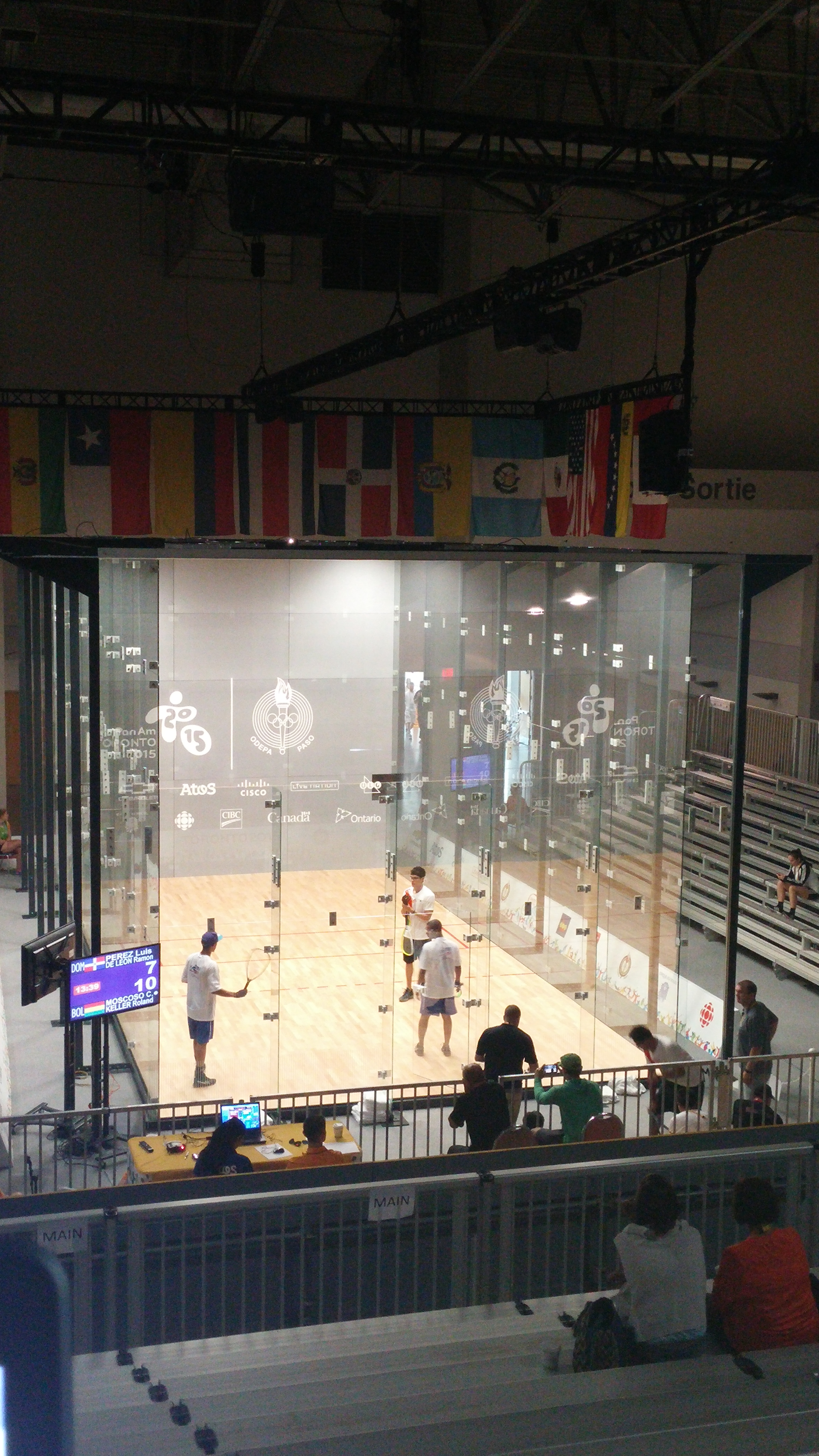
The Direct Energy Centre (Exhibition Centre), Hall C, was the venue for the racquetball competitions

All times are Central Standard Time (UTC-6).

Date	Time	Round
July 19, 2015	17:05	Round Robin
July 20, 2015	17:05	Round Robin
July 21, 2015	17:05	Round Robin
July 22, 2015	19:05	First Round
July 23, 2015	12:15	Quarterfinals
July 23, 2015	20:45	Semifinals
July 24, 2015	13:40	Final

== Round robin ==
The round robin will be used as a qualification round. Groups was announced at the technical meeting the day before the competition begins.

=== Pool A ===
Player	Nation	Pld	W	L	Points
Álvaro Beltrán & Javier Moreno	Mexico	2	2	0	4
Alejandro Herrera & Sebastian Franco	Colombia	2	1	1	3
Daniel Maggi & Shai Manzuri	Argentina	2	0	2	2

=== Pool B ===
Player	Nation	Pld	W	L	Points
Vincent Gagnon & Tim Landeryou	Canada	3	3	0	6
Jansen Allen & Jose Rojas	United States	3	2	1	5
Teobaldo Fumero & Felipe Camacho	Costa Rica	3	1	2	4
Fernando Rios & Jose Alvarez	Ecuador	3	0	3	1

=== Pool C ===
Player	Nation	Pld	W	L	Points
Conrrado Moscoso & Roland Keller	Bolivia	3	3	0	6
Cesar Castillo & Cesar Castro	Venezuela	3	2	1	5
Luis Pérez & Ramón de León	Dominican Republic	3	1	2	4
Christian Wer & Edwin Galicia	Guatemala	3	0	3	1

== Playoffs ==
First Round
Luis Pérez (Dominican Republic) Ramón de León (DOM)	0	15	11
Teobaldo Fumero (Costa Rica) Felipe Camacho (CRC)	15	14	8
Fernando Rios (Ecuador) Jose Alvarez (ECU)
Alejandro Herrera (Colombia) Sebastian Franco (COL)	WO
Daniel Maggi (Argentina) Shai Manzuri (ARG)	15	15
Christian Wer (Guatemala) Edwin Galicia (GUA)	12	14

Quarterfinals
Álvaro Beltrán (Mexico) Javier Moreno (MEX)	15	15
Luis Pérez (Dominican Republic) Ramón de León (DOM)	6	10
Jansen Allen (United States) Jose Rojas (USA)	15	15
Cesar Castillo (Venezuela) Cesar Castro (VEN)	5	8
Conrrado Moscoso (Bolivia) Roland Keller (BOL)	8	15	11
Alejandro Herrera (Colombia) Sebastian Franco (COL)	15	9	6
Daniel Maggi (Argentina) Shai Manzuri (ARG)	14	9
Vincent Gagnon (Canada) Tim Landeryou (CAN)	15	15

Semifinals
Álvaro Beltrán (Mexico) Javier Moreno (MEX)	13	14
Jansen Allen (United States) Jose Rojas (USA)	15	15
Conrrado Moscoso (Bolivia) Roland Keller (BOL)	15	15
Vincent Gagnon (Canada) Tim Landeryou (CAN)	11	9

Final
Jansen Allen (United States) Jose Rojas (USA)	15	15
Conrrado Moscoso (Bolivia) Roland Keller (BOL)	8	5
