= Racquetball at the 2015 Pan American Games =

- Racquetball pictogram for the games
- Venue: Exhibition Centre – Hall C
- Dates: July 19–26
- No. of events: 6 (3 men, 3 women)
- Competitors: 55 from 13 nations

Racquetball competitions at the 2015 Pan American Games in Toronto was held from July 19 to 26. The venue for the competitions was the Direct Energy Centre (Exhibition Centre) Hall C, due to naming rights the venue will be known as the latter for the duration of the games. The venue also staged the squash competitions. A total of six events were contested (three each for men and women). After the games, the four courts created for the games were disassembled and relocated to Regina, Saskatchewan.

== Competition schedule ==
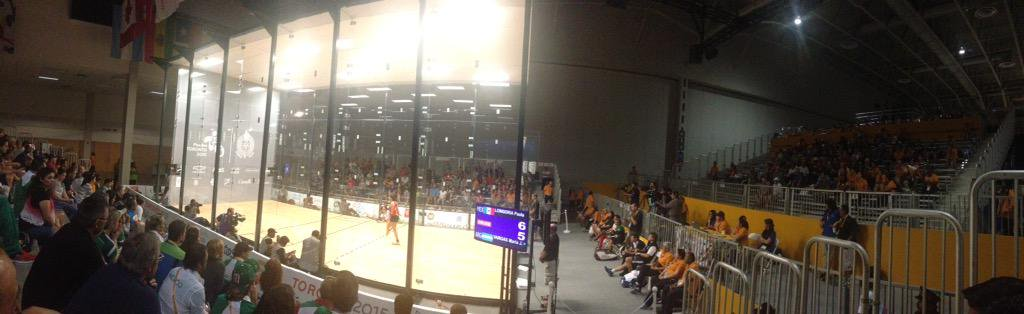
The Direct Energy Centre (Exhibition Centre), Hall C, was the venue for the racquetball competitions

The following is the competition schedule for the racquetball competitions:

RR	Round robin	E	Eliminations	½	Semifinals	F	Final

Event↓/Date →	Sun 19	Mon 20	Tue 21	Wed 22	Thu 23	Fri 24	Sat 25		Sun 26
Men's singles	RR	RR	RR	E	½	F			
Men's doubles	RR	RR	RR	E	½	F			
Men's team						E	E	½	F
Women's singles	RR	RR	RR	E	½	F			
Women's doubles	RR	RR	RR	E	½	F			
Women's team						E	E	½	F

== Medal table ==
* Host nation (Canada)

Rank	Nation	Gold	Silver	Bronze	Total
1	Mexico	4	1	2	7
2	United States	2	2	2	6
3	Argentina	0	2	0	2
4	Bolivia	0	1	2	3
5	Canada*	0	0	3	3
5	Ecuador	0	0	3	3
Totals (6 entries)		6	6	12	24

== Medalists ==
=== Men's events ===
Event	Gold	Silver	Bronze
Men's singles	Rocky Carson; United States	Álvaro Beltrán; Mexico	Conrrado Moscoso; Bolivia
Men's singles	Rocky Carson; United States	Álvaro Beltrán; Mexico	Daniel De La Rosa; Mexico
Men's doubles	United States; Jansen Allen; Jose Rojas	Bolivia; Conrrado Moscoso; Roland Keller	Canada; Vincent Gagnon; Tim Landeryou
Men's doubles	United States; Jansen Allen; Jose Rojas	Bolivia; Conrrado Moscoso; Roland Keller	Mexico; Álvaro Beltrán; Javier Moreno
Men's team	Mexico; Álvaro Beltrán; Daniel De La Rosa; Javier Moreno	United States; Jansen Allen; Jake Bredenbeck; Rocky Carson; Jose Rojas	Bolivia; Carlos Keller; Roland Keller; Conrrado Moscoso
Men's team	Mexico; Álvaro Beltrán; Daniel De La Rosa; Javier Moreno	United States; Jansen Allen; Jake Bredenbeck; Rocky Carson; Jose Rojas	Canada; Vincent Gagnon; Mike Green; Coby Iwaasa; Tim Landeryou

=== Women's events ===
Event	Gold	Silver	Bronze
Women's singles	Paola Longoria; Mexico	Maria Jose Vargas; Argentina	Maria Sotomayor; Ecuador
Women's singles	Paola Longoria; Mexico	Maria Jose Vargas; Argentina	Rhonda Rajsich; United States
Women's doubles	Mexico; Paola Longoria; Samantha Salas	Argentina; Maria Jose Vargas; Veronique Guillemette	Ecuador; Maria Sotomayor; Maria P Muñoz
Women's doubles	Mexico; Paola Longoria; Samantha Salas	Argentina; Maria Jose Vargas; Veronique Guillemette	United States; Rhonda Rajsich; Kim Russell
Women's team	Mexico; Paola Longoria; Samantha Salas	United States; Michelle Key; Rhonda Rajsich; Kim Russell	Canada; Frédérique Lambert; Jennifer Saunders
Women's team	Mexico; Paola Longoria; Samantha Salas	United States; Michelle Key; Rhonda Rajsich; Kim Russell	Ecuador; María Muñoz; Maria Sotomayor

== Participating nations ==
A total of 13 countries have qualified athletes. The number of athletes a nation has entered is in parentheses beside the name of the country.

- Argentina (4)
- Bolivia (6)
- Canada (8)
- Chile (2)
- Colombia (5)
- Costa Rica (3)
- Cuba (1)
- Dominican Republic (2)
- Ecuador (4)
- Guatemala (4)
- Mexico (6)
- United States (7)
- Venezuela (4)

== Qualification ==
A total of 56 athletes will qualify to compete at the Games (30 male, 26 female). Each country is allowed to enter a maximum of four male and four female athletes.
