= Racquetball at the 2013 World Games – Men's singles =

Sporting competition

2013 World Games - Racquetball men's singles
Host	(Colombia) Cali
Dates	July 26–28, 2013
Teams	16
Podium
Champions	(Mexico) Polo Gutierrez
Runners-up	(Mexico) Gilberto Mejia
Third place	(United States) Rocky Carson
Fourth place	(United States) Jose Rojas

The Racquetball - Men's Singles was a sporting competition held at the World Games 2013 that took place from July 26 to 28, 2013 at the Cañasgordas Club in Cali, Colombia. Players were qualified for this event from their performances at the 2012 Racquetball World Championships.

== Men's singles ==
Round of 16
1	(United States) Rocky Carson	15	15
16	(Guatemala) Pedro Manolo Sandoval	4	13
9	(Canada) Tim Landeryou	13	6
8	(Colombia) Alejandro Herrera	15	15
5	(Bolivia) Carlos Keller	15	15
12	(Venezuela) Luis Reveron	3	1
13	(Dominican Republic) Luis Pérez	7	5
4	(Mexico) Gilberto Mejía	15	15
3	(United States) José Rojas	15	15
14	(South Korea) Kim Mingyu	4	7
11	(Costa Rica) Felipe Camacho	15	13	2
6	(Argentina) Shai Manzuri	12	15	11
7	(Colombia) Juan Herrera	8	7
10	(Venezuela) Cesar Castillo	15	15
15	(Bolivia) Kadim Carrasco	4	6
2	(Mexico) Polo Gutiérrez	15	15

Quarter finals
1	(United States) Rocky Carson	15	15
8	(Colombia) Alejandro Herrera	5	6
5	(Bolivia) Carlos Keller	5	15	0 - injury forfeit
4	(Mexico) Gilberto Mejía	15	11	5
3	(United States) José Rojas	15	15
6	(Argentina) Shai Manzuri	10	5
10	(Venezuela) Cesar Castillo	3	5
2	(Mexico) Polo Gutiérrez	15	15

Semi finals
1	(United States) Rocky Carson	10	15	9
4	(Mexico) Gilberto Mejía	15	9	11
3	(United States) José Rojas	9	15	9
2	(Mexico) Polo Gutiérrez	15	8	11

Finals
4	(Mexico) Gilberto Mejía	15	14	10
2	(Mexico) Polo Gutiérrez	11	15	11
3rd place
1	(United States) Rocky Carson	15	9	11
3	(United States) José Rojas	12	15	5
