= Racquetball in India =

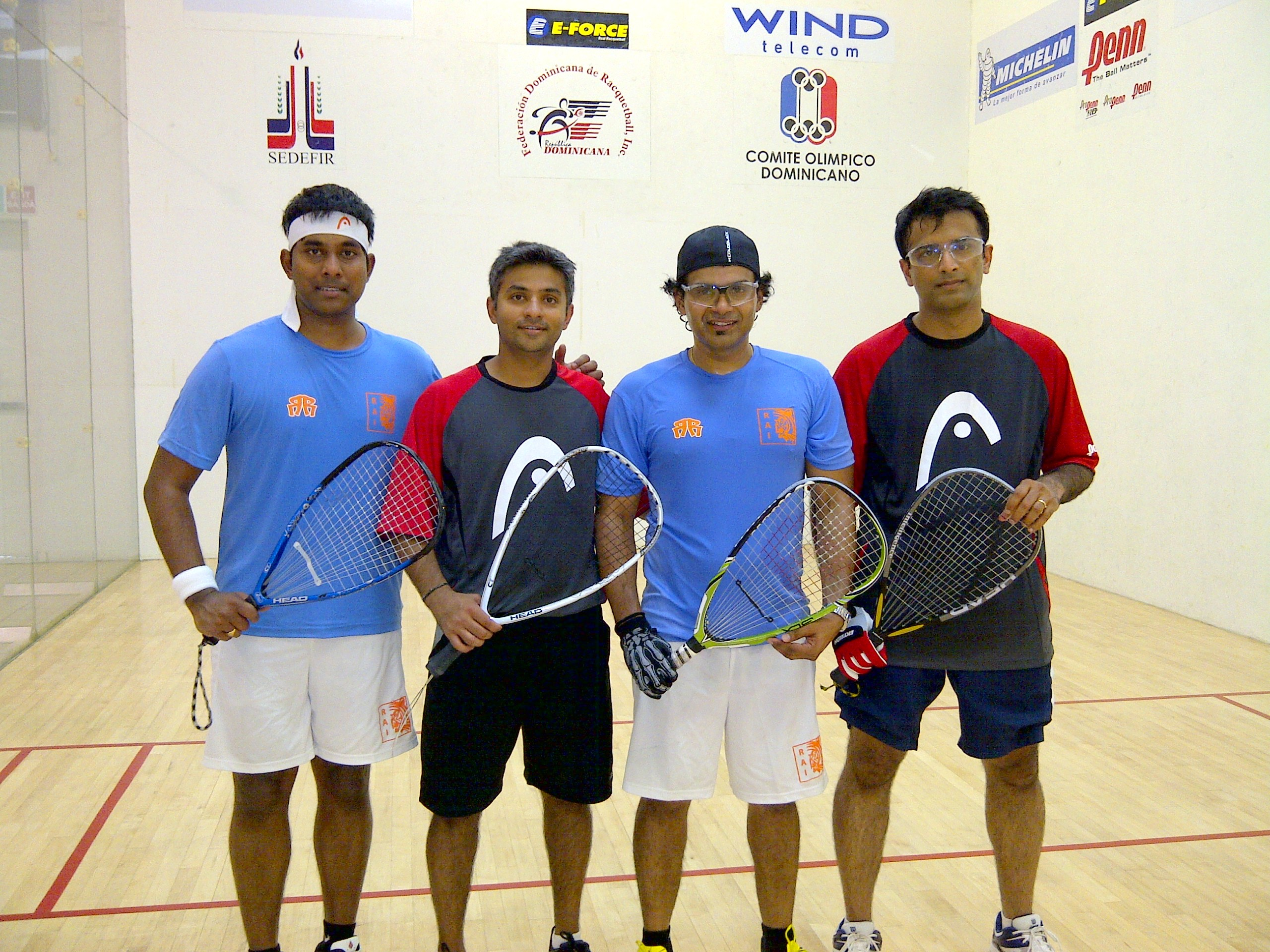
- The India Racquetball Team in 2012
- Country: India
- National team: India

Indian sportsmen have achieved success in racquetball, in spite of the game not being widely played in the country. India has been represented at the Racquetball World Championships since 1998. Sudhanshu Harshavat representing India won the gold medal at the Promus US Open Racquetball Championship in Memphis Tennessee in 1999. He also won the silver medal in the amateur category. India fielded a three-member contingent comprising captain Sathwik Rai, Srikaran Kandadai and Raaj Mohan at the Championships held in Seoul in August 2010. The team won a gold and a silver medal in the White Division. Actor Srinivas Avasarala together with Srikaran Kandadai represented India at the Asian Championship in Seoul in February 2014. In March of the same year, the first India Open Racquetball Singles Championship was held in Hyderabad. A two-member team represented the country at the Asian Championships in Seoul in November 2017.

== Gallery ==
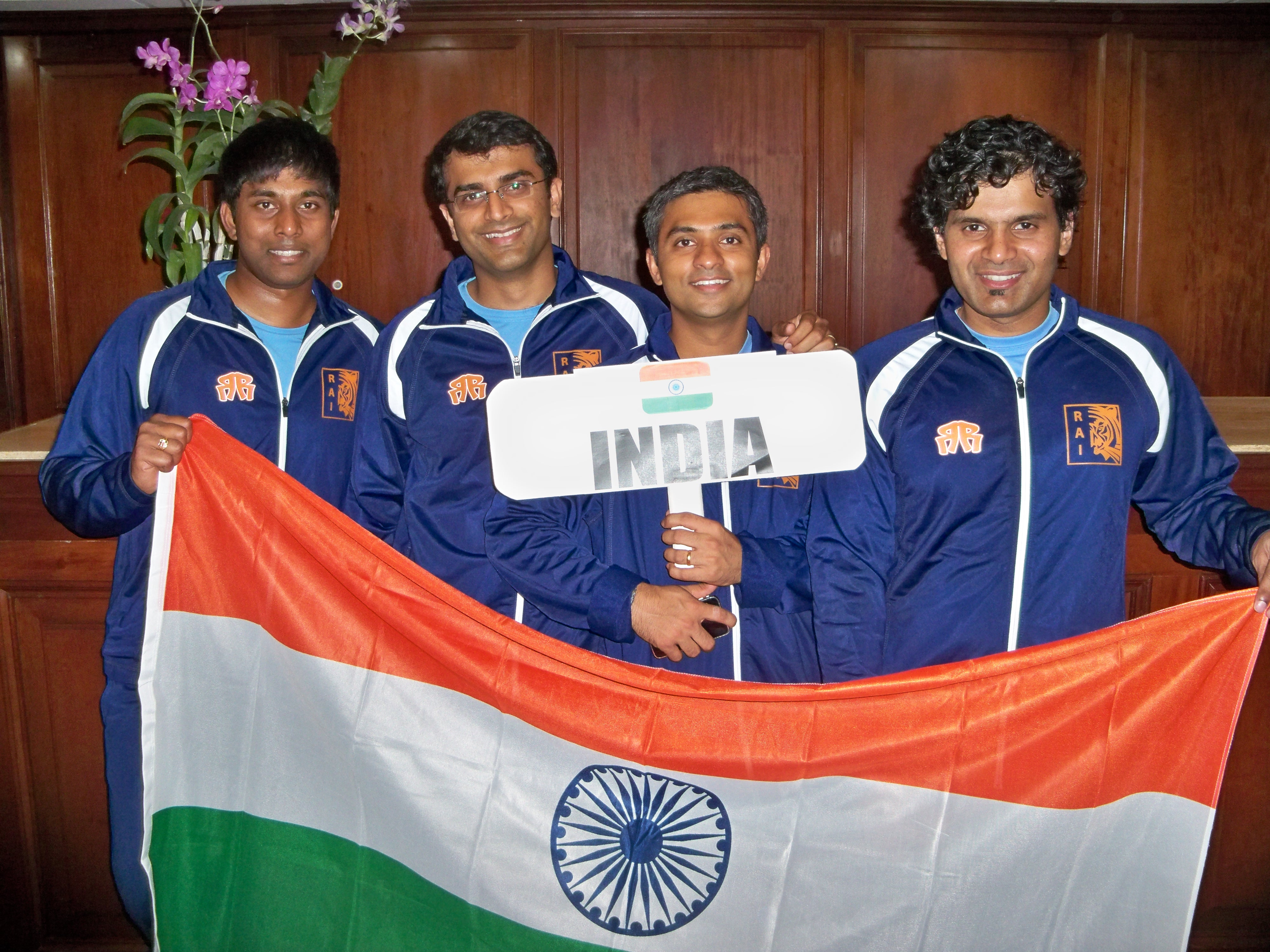

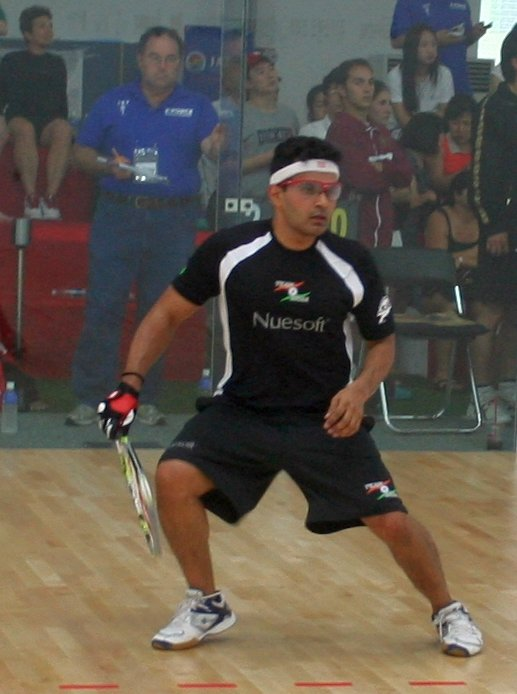
Indian player Sathwik Rai

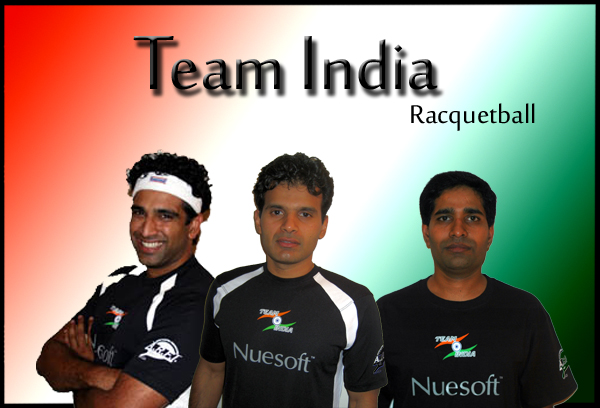
The Indian team in 2010
