= Racquetball at the 2014 Central American and Caribbean Games =

- Venue: Leyes de Reforma Sports Complex
- Dates: 15–24 November
- Nations: 8

The racquetball competition at the 2014 Central American and Caribbean Games was held at the Racquet Complex in Leyes de Reforma Sports Complex in Veracruz, Mexico, from 15 to 24 November.

There were individual competitions in men's and women's singles and doubles 15–21 November with men's and women's team competitions on 22–24 November.

Mexican players are the incumbent Central American and Caribbean Games champions in all divisions. In 2010, Álvaro Beltrán of Mexico won men's singles, Javier Moreno and Polo Gutierrez of Mexico won men's doubles, Paola Longoria of Mexico won women's singles, and Samantha Salas and Susana Acosta of Mexico won women's doubles.

Mexico also won the men's and women's team competitions. Beltrán, Moreno, Gutierrez and Gilberto Meija were the men's team with Longoria, Salas, Acosta and Jessica Parrilla on the women's team.

== Medal summary ==
=== Men's events ===
Event	Gold	Silver	Bronze
Singles	Álvaro Beltrán (MEX)	Daniel De La Rosa (MEX)	Alejandro Herrera (COL); Felipe Camacho (CRC)
Doubles	Mexico (MEX); Álvaro Beltrán; Javier Moreno	Dominican Republic (DOM); Luis Pérez; Junior Rodríguez	Guatemala (GUA); Edwin Galicia; Christian Wer; Venezuela (VEN); Cesar Castillo; César Castro
Team	Mexico (MEX); Álvaro Beltrán; Javier Moreno; Daniel De La Rosa	Costa Rica (CRC); Felipe Camacho; Andrés Acuña; Andres Aviles; Joaquin Solera	Colombia (COL); Alejandro Herrera; Cesar Castillo; César Castro Dominican Republic (DOM); Luis Pérez; Junior Rodríguez

=== Women's events ===
Event	Gold	Silver	Bronze
Singles	Paola Longoria (MEX)	Samantha Salas (MEX)	Cristina Amaya (COL); Gabriela Martinez (GUA)
Doubles	Mexico (MEX); Paola Longoria; Samantha Salas	Guatemala (GUA); Gabriela Martinez; Maria Rodriguez	Colombia (COL); Cristina Amaya; Maria Gomez; Venezuela (VEN); Mariana Tabon; Mariana Paredes
Team	Mexico (MEX); Paola Longoria; Samantha Salas	Guatemala (GUA); Gabriela Martinez; Maria Rodriguez	Colombia (COL); Cristina Amaya; Maria Gomez; Venezuela (VEN); Mariana Tabon; Mariana Paredes

== Medal table ==
* Host nation (Mexico)

Rank	Nation	Gold	Silver	Bronze	Total
1	Mexico (MEX)*	6	2	0	8
2	Guatemala (GUA)	0	2	2	4
3	Costa Rica (CRC)	0	1	1	2
3	Dominican Republic (DOM)	0	1	1	2
5	Colombia (COL)	0	0	5	5
6	Venezuela (VEN)	0	0	3	3
Totals (6 entries)		6	6	12	24

== Result Summaries ==
=== Men's singles ===
Quarter-finals
November 19
(Mexico) Álvaro Beltrán	15, 15
(Dominican Republic) Luis Pérez	7, 14
November 19
(Costa Rica) Felipe Camacho	15, 15
(Colombia) Francisco Gomez	3, 1
November 19
(Mexico) Daniel De La Rosa	15, 15
(Guatemala) Christian Wer	7, 4
November 19
(Colombia) Alejandro Herrera	15, 14, 11
(Costa Rica) Andrés Acuña	9, 15, 3

Semi-finals
November 20
(Mexico) Álvaro Beltrán	15, 15
(Costa Rica) Felipe Camacho	2, 8
November 20
(Mexico) Daniel De La Rosa	15, 15
(Colombia) Alejandro Herrera	8, 3

Final
November 21
(Mexico) Álvaro Beltrán	15, 15
(Mexico) Daniel De La Rosa	7, 2

=== Men's doubles ===
Quarter-finals
November 19
Venezuela	15, 14, 11
Colombia	11, 15, 7
November 19
Guatemala	9, 15, 11
Costa Rica	15, 13, 6
November 19
Dominican Republic	15, 15
Honduras	13, 1

Semi-finals
November 20
Mexico	15, 15
Venezuela	6, 5
November 20
Dominican Republic	15, 15
Guatemala	12, 12

Final
November 21
Mexico	15, 15
Dominican Republic	10, 6

=== Women's singles ===
Quarter-finals
November 19
(Mexico) Paola Longoria	15, 15
(Venezuela) Ishlhey Paredes	0, 4
November 19
(Guatemala) Ana Gabriela Martinez	15, 15
(Colombia) Maria Gomez	6, 6
November 19
(Mexico) Samantha Salas	15, 15
(Guatemala) Maria Renee Rodriguez	3, 9
November 19
(Colombia) Cristina Amaya	15, 15
(Costa Rica) Melania Sauma	10, 14

Semi-finals
November 20
(Mexico) Paola Longoria	15, 15
(Guatemala) Ana Gabriela Martinez	5, 9
November 20
(Mexico) Samantha Salas	15, 15
(Colombia) Cristina Amaya	7, 9

Final
November 21
(Mexico) Paola Longoria	15, 15
(Mexico) Samantha Salas	2, 3

=== Women's doubles ===
Quarter-finals
November 19
Mexico	15, 15
Honduras	1, 3
November 19
Venezuela	15, 15
Dominican Republic	12, 14
November 19
Guatemala	15, 15
Costa Rica	7, 12
November 19
Colombia	15, 15
Nicaragua	0, 2

Semi-finals
November 20
Mexico	15, 15
Venezuela	6, 6
November 20
Guatemala	15, 15
Colombia	12, 12

Final
November 21
Mexico	15, 15
Guatemala	4, 2
