= 2016 Racquetball World Championships =

- XVIII Racquetball World Championships: Colombia 2016 -
Host	Cali, Colombia
Dates	July 15–23
- Men's singles
Gold	(United States) Rocky Carson
Silver	(Mexico) Daniel De La Rosa
Bronze	(Bolivia) Conrrado Moscoso, (Canada) Samuel Murray
- Women's singles
Gold	(Mexico) Paola Longoria
Silver	(Guatemala) Gabriela Martínez
Bronze	(Argentina) María José Vargas, (Mexico) Samantha Salas
- Men's doubles
Gold	(Mexico) Álvaro Beltrán & Javier Moreno
Silver	(United States) Jake Bredenbeck & Jose Diaz
Bronze	(Colombia) Sebastian Franco & Alejandro Herrera, (Bolivia) Kadim Carasco & Carlos Keller
- Women's doubles
Gold	(United States) Aimee Ruiz & Janel Tisinger
Silver	(Mexico) Paola Longoria & Samantha Salas
Bronze	(Canada) Frédérique Lambert & Jennifer Saunders, (Bolivia) Jenny Daza & Adriana Riveros

The International Racquetball Federation's 18th Racquetball World Championships were held in Cali, Colombia from July 15 to 23, 2016. This was the first time that Colombia had hosted Worlds, and the first time Worlds had been held in South America since 1998, when Cochabamba, Bolivia hosted the event.

American Rocky Carson and Mexican Paola Longoria were the incumbent champions in men's and women's singles, respectively.

Longoria was also the incumbent champion in women's doubles with Samantha Salas, and they successfully defended their title. Colombians Sebastian Franco and Alejandro Herrera tried to defend the men's doubles title that they won in Canada two years prior.

== Tournament format ==
The 2016 World Championships used a two-stage format to determine the World Champions. Initially, players competed in separate groups over three days. The results were used to seed players for an elimination round. Thus, there was no team competition. Team standings were based on points earned from the singles and doubles competitions.

== Events ==
=== Men's singles ===
Semi-finals
(United States) Rocky Carson	15, 12, 11
(Bolivia) Conrrado Moscoso	12, 15, 4
(Canada) Samuel Murray	12, 7
(Mexico) Daniel De La Rosa	15, 15

Final
(United States) Rocky Carson	15, 5, 11
(Mexico) Daniel De La Rosa	11, 15, 5

=== Women's singles ===
Semi-finals
(Mexico) Paola Longoria	15, 15
(Argentina) María José Vargas	5, 5
(Mexico) Samantha Salas	11, 15, 9
(Guatemala) Gabriela Martínez	15, 14, 11

Final
(Mexico) Paola Longoria	15, 15
(Guatemala) Gabriela Martínez	12, 5

=== Men's doubles ===
Semi-finals
(United States) Jake Bredenbeck & Jose Diaz	15, 8, 11
(Bolivia) Kadim Carasco & Carlos Keller	14, 15, 8
(Colombia) Sebastian Franco & Alejandro Herrera	2, 5
(Mexico) Álvaro Beltrán & Javier Moreno	15, 15

Final
(United States) Jake Bredenbeck & Jose Diaz	12, 9
(Mexico) Álvaro Beltrán & Javier Moreno	15, 15

=== Women's doubles ===
Semi-finals
(Mexico) Paola Longoria & Samantha Salas	15, 15
(Bolivia) Jenny Daza & Adriana Riveros	5, 5
(Canada) Frédérique Lambert & Jennifer Saunders	8, 7
(United States) Aimee Ruiz & Janel Tisinger	15, 15

Final
(Mexico) Paola Longoria & Samantha Salas	11, 15, 8
(United States) Aimee Ruiz & Janel Tisinger	15, 9, 11

== Medal table ==
Rank	Nation	Gold	Silver	Bronze	Total
1	Mexico (MEX)	2	2	1	5
2	United States (USA)	2	1	0	3
3	Guatemala (GUA)	0	1	0	1
4	Bolivia (BOL)	0	0	3	3
5	Canada (CAN)	0	0	2	2
6	Argentina (ARG)	0	0	1	1
6	Colombia (COL)	0	0	1	1
Totals (7 entries)		4	4	8	16

== Team results ==
Final team standings
	Men's team	Women's team	Overall/combined
1	(United States) USA	Mexico	Mexico
2	Mexico	USA	USA
3	Bolivia	Guatemala	Bolivia
4	Canada	Canada	Canada
5	Ecuador	Bolivia	Ecuador
6	Colombia	Argentina	Guatemala
7	Costa Rica, Japan	Ecuador	Argentina
8	Bolivia	Dominican Republic	Colombia
9	Dominican Republic	Colombia	Japan
10	Argentina	South Korea	Dominican Republic
11	Venezuela	Venezuela	Venezuela
12	Guatemala	Japan	South Korea
13	South Korea	Chile	Costa Rica
14	(Bolivia) Puerto Rico	Ireland	Chile
15	India	Honduras	Honduras
16	Honduras	Costa Rica	(Republic of Ireland) Ireland
17	Chile, England	Costa Rica	Puerto Rico
18			India
19	Indonesia		England
20			Indonesia
