= Racquetball at the 2011 Pan American Games – Men's singles =

Racquetball – Men's singles at the 2011 Pan American Games
- Venue: Racquetball Complex
- Dates: October 17 - October 22

Medalists
Gold medal	Rocky Carson	United States
Silver medal	Gilberto Mejia	Mexico
Bronze medal	Vincent Gagnon	Canada
Bronze medal	Álvaro Beltrán	Mexico

The men's singles competition of the racquetball events at the 2011 Pan American Games was held from October 17–22 at the Racquetball Complex in Guadalajara, Mexico. The defending Pan American Games champion is Jack Huczek of the United States, while the defending Pan American regional champion from 2011 is Daniel De La Rosa of Mexico.

== Schedule ==
All times are Central Standard Time (UTC-6).

Date	Time	Round
October 17, 2011	8:00	Groups
October 18, 2011	8:00	Groups
October 19, 2011	8:00	Round of 16
October 20, 2011	8:00	Quarterfinals
October 21, 2011	8:00	Semifinals
October 22, 2011	10:00	Final

== Round robin ==
The round robin will be used as a qualification round. Groups was announced at the technical meeting the day before the competition begins.

=== Pool A ===
Player	Pld	W	L	GF	GA	PF	PA	Points
Álvaro Beltrán (MEX)	3	3	0	6	0	90	45	6
Cesar Castillo (VEN)	3	2	1	4	3	86	72	5
Juan S. Herrera (COL)	3	1	2	3	4	65	81	4
Raul Banegas (HON)	3	0	3	0	6	47	90	3

=== Pool B ===
Player	Pld	W	L	GF	GA	PF	PA	Points
Vincent Gagnon (CAN)	3	2	1	5	2	89	53	5
Cesar Castro (VEN)	3	2	1	4	2	74	51	5
Alejandro Herrera (COL)	3	2	1	4	3	75	69	5
Ramón de León (DOM)	3	0	3	0	6	25	90	3

=== Pool C ===
Player	Pld	W	L	GF	GA	PF	PA	Points
Gilberto D. Mejia (MEX)	3	3	0	6	0	90	38	6
Fernando J. Rios (ECU)	3	2	1	4	2	75	57	5
Alex St. Ackermann (USA)	3	1	2	2	4	63	69	4
Selvin Cruz (HON)	3	0	3	0	6	26	90	3

=== Pool D ===
Player	Pld	W	L	GF	GA	PF	PA	Points
Carlos Keller (BOL)	3	3	0	6	1	90	62	6
Luis Pérez (DOM)	3	2	1	4	3	69	86	5
Michael G. Green (CAN)	3	1	2	4	4	93	78	4
Teobaldo Fumero (CRC)	3	0	3	0	6	64	90	3

=== Pool E ===
Player	Pld	W	L	GF	GA	PF	PA	Points
Rocky Carson III (USA)	3	3	0	6	0	90	41	6
Ricardo Monroy (BOL)	3	2	1	4	2	79	57	5
Felipe Camacho (CRC)	3	1	2	2	4	59	72	4
Jose D. Ugalde (ECU)	3	0	3	0	6	32	90	3

== Playoffs ==
=== Finals ===
Semifinals					Final
1	Álvaro Beltrán (MEX)	12	12
5	Rocky Carson (USA)	15	15		5	Rocky Carson (USA)	15	15
3	Gilberto Mejia (MEX)	15	14	11	3	Gilberto Mejia (MEX)	1	13
2	Vincent Gagnon (CAN)	11	15	5

=== Top half ===
First Round
16	Teobaldo Fumero (CRC)	15	11	11
17	Jose Ugalde (ECU)	12	15	8
13	Alex St. Ackermann (USA)	15	15
20	Raul Banegas (HON)	12	5

Second Round
1	Álvaro Beltrán (MEX)	15	15
16	Teobaldo Fumero (CRC)	3	3
8	Cesar Castro (VEN)	0	0	w/o
9	Fernando Rios (ECU)	15	15
5	Rocky Carson (USA)	15	15
12	Alejandro Herrera (COL)	11	6
13	Alex St. Ackermann (USA)	7	6
4	Carlos Keller (BOL)	15	15

Quarterfinals
1	Álvaro Beltrán (MEX)	15	15
9	Fernando Rios (ECU)	10	5
5	Rocky Carson (USA)	15	15
4	Carlos Keller (BOL)	11	0

Semifinals
1	Álvaro Beltrán (MEX)	12	12
5	Rocky Carson (USA)	15	15

=== Bottom half ===
First Round
19	Ramón de León (DOM)	7	3
14	Michael Green (CAN)	15	15
15	Felipe Camacho (CRC)	15	15
18	Selvin Cruz (HON)	8	11

Second Round
3	Gilberto Mejia (MEX)	15	7	11
14	Michael Green (CAN)	13	15	2
11	Juan Herrera (COL)	15	15
6	Ricardo Monroy (BOL)	13	7
7	Luis Pérez (DOM)	12	15	11
10	Cesar Castillo (VEN)	15	10	6
15	Felipe Camacho (CRC)	9	11
2	Vincent Gagnon (CAN)	15	15

Quarterfinals
3	Gilberto Mejia (MEX)	15	15
11	Juan Herrera (COL)	10	8
7	Luis Pérez (DOM)	7	9
2	Vincent Gagnon (CAN)	15	15

Semifinals
3	Gilberto Mejia (MEX)	15	14	11
2	Vincent Gagnon (CAN)	11	15	5
