= 2018 Racquetball World Championships =

- XIX Racquetball World Championships; 2018
Host	San José, Costa Rica
Dates	August 10–18, 2018
- Men's singles
Gold	(Mexico) Rodrigo Montoya
Silver	(United States) Charlie Pratt
Bronze	(United States) David Horn (Colombia) Sebastian Franco
- Women's singles
Gold	(Guatemala) Gabriela Martínez
Silver	(Mexico) Paola Longoria
Bronze	(Argentina) María José Vargas (Argentina) Natalia Mendez
- Men's doubles
Gold	(Mexico) Álvaro Beltrán & Daniel de la Rosa
Silver	(United States) Rocky Carson & Sudsy Monchik
Bronze	(Bolivia) Roland Keller & Conrrado Moscoso (Canada) Tim Landeryou & Samuel Murray
- Women's doubles
Gold	(Bolivia) Valeria Centellas & Yazmine Sabja
Silver	(Mexico) Alexandra Herrera & Montserrat Mejía
Bronze	(Guatemala) Gabriela Martínez & Maria Renee Rodriguez (Colombia) Cristina Amaya & Adriana Riveros

The International Racquetball Federation's 19th Racquetball World Championships were held in San José, Costa Rica from August 10–18, 2018. Originally, the event was to be held in Haining, China, but on March 17, 2018, the IRT announced via its Facebook page that the venue would be changed due to complications. Cali, Colombia was the first alternative choice, but there were complications there as well, so on June 16, 2018, the IRF announced via Facebook that San José, Costa Rica would host Worlds.

Rodrigo Montoya of Mexico won men's singles for the first time, defeating the USA's Charlie Pratt in the final. In women's singles, Gabriela Martínez of Guatemala upset the three-time defending champion Mexican Paola Longoria to win gold. Álvaro Beltrán and Daniel de la Rosa won men's doubles in three games over Rocky Carson and Sudsy Monchik of the US, and Bolivians Valeria Centellas and Yasmine Sabja became the first women from South America to win Women's doubles after defeating Mexicans Alexandra Herrera and Monserrat Mejia in a three-game final.

2018 was the first year in which the USA did not win a gold medal at Worlds. On five occasions the USA swept the gold medals in men's and women's singles and doubles: 1981, 1992, 1996, 2004, 2008. Also, 2018 was the third time that three countries won a gold medal at Worlds; that first happened in 2006 and 2014.

== Tournament format ==
The 2018 World Championships used a two-stage format to determine the World Champions. Initially, players competed in separate groups over three days. The results were used to seed players for an elimination round. Thus, there was no team competition. Team standings were based on points earned from the singles and doubles competitions.

== Medal table ==
Rank	Nation	Gold	Silver	Bronze	Total
1	Mexico (MEX)	2	2	0	4
2	Bolivia (BOL)	1	0	1	2
2	Guatemala (GUA)	1	0	1	2
4	United States (USA)	0	2	1	3
5	Argentina (ARG)	0	0	2	2
5	Colombia (COL)	0	0	2	2
7	Canada (CAN)	0	0	1	1
Totals (7 entries)		4	4	8	16

== Events ==
=== Men's singles ===
Semifinals
(United States) David Horn	9	8
(Mexico) Rodrigo Montoya	15	15
(United States) Charlie Pratt	15	15
(Colombia) Sebastian Franco	8	13

Final
(United States) Charlie Pratt	14	9
(Mexico) Rodrigo Montoya	15	15

=== Women's singles ===
Semifinals
(Mexico) Paola Longoria	6	15	11
(Argentina) María José Vargas	15	2	7
(Guatemala) Gabriela Martínez	15	15
(Argentina) Natalia Mendez	8	3

Final
(Mexico) Paola Longoria	15	6	6
(Guatemala) Gabriela Martínez	8	15	11

=== Men's doubles ===
Semifinals
(Mexico) Álvaro Beltrán & Daniel de la Rosa	15	15
(Bolivia) Roland Keller & Conrrado Moscoso	14	8
(United States) Rocky Carson & Sudsy Monchik	15	15
(Canada) Tim Landeryou & Samuel Murray	12	2

Final
(Mexico) Álvaro Beltrán & Daniel de la Rosa	10	15	11
(United States) Rocky Carson & Sudsy Monchik	15	9	2

=== Women's doubles ===
Semifinals
(Mexico) Alexandra Herrera & Montserrat Mejía	15	15
(Colombia) Cristina Amaya & Adriana Riveros	8	4
(Guatemala) Gabriela Martínez & Maria Renee Rodriguez	15	7	4, injury forfeit
(Bolivia) Valeria Centellas & Yasmine Sabja	10	15	6

Final
(Mexico) Alexandra Herrera & Montserrat Mejía	15	14	2
(Bolivia) Valeria Centellas & Yasmine Sabja	8	15	11

== Team results ==
Final team standings
	Men's team	Points	Women's team	Points	Overall/combined	Points
1	Mexico	432	Mexico	352	Mexico	784
2	(United States) USA	392	Guatemala	332	USA	546
3	Colombia	216	Bolivia	268	Bolivia	480
4	Bolivia	212	Argentina	248	Guatemala	414
5	Canada	196	Colombia	196	Colombia	412
6	Argentina	126	USA	154	Argentina	374
7	Dominican Republic	110	South Korea	110	Canada	280
8	Costa Rica	108	Canada	84	Dominican Republic	174
9	Ecuador	90	Japan	82	Japan, South Korea	166
10	Japan	84	Chile	74		
11	Guatemala	82	Dominican Republic	64	Ecuador	146
12	Venezuela	64	Ecuador	56	Chile	122
13	South Korea	56	Ireland	48	Costa Rica	118
14	Chile	48	Venezuela, Costa Rica	10	(Republic of Ireland) Ireland	88
15	(Republic of Ireland) Ireland	40			Venezuela	74
16	India	35			India	35
17	Puerto Rico	18			Puerto Rico	
18	Switzerland	5			Switzerland	5
