= Jose Rojas (racquetball) =

American racquetball player (born 1990)

Personal information
- Nationality: American
- Born: April 27, 1990 (age 36) Stockton, California
- Height: 5 ft 8 in (173 cm)

Sport
- Sport: Racquetball
- College team: Delta College
- Turned pro: 2009

Achievements and titles
- Highest world ranking: No. 3
Medal record
Men's Racquetball
Representing United States
World Championships
Bronze medal – third place	Burlington 2014	Singles
Gold medal – first place	Santo Domingo 2012	Team
Bronze medal – third place	Santo Domingo 2012	Singles
Pan Am Games
Gold medal – first place	Toronto 2015	Doubles
Silver medal – second place	Toronto 2015	Team
Pan Am Championships
Gold medal – first place	Santa Cruz 2014	Singles
Silver medal – second place	Santa Cruz 2014	Doubles

Jose Rojas (born April 27, 1990) is a professional racquetball player. Rojas's highest ranking is #3 on the International Racquetball Tour (IRT), which he was at the end of the 2011–12 season. At the end of the 2014–15 season, Rojas was #6, which was his sixth time in the IRT top 10 at season's end. Rojas has represented the USA several times in international competition, and been a gold medalist three times.

== Professional career ==
Rojas has two wins on the International Racquetball Tour (IRT). His latest was at the Kansas City Pro-Am in September 2013, when he defeated Rocky Carson in the final, 11–4, 11–5, 9–11, 3–11, 13–11, and more remarkably beat Kane Waselenchuk, in the semi-finals, 2–11, 11–9, 11–8, 11–4, which was Waselenchuk's first loss in a complete match since January 2009.

Rojas's previous win was in February 2012 at the San Diego Open, when he beat Álvaro Beltrán in the final. His only other finals appearance was at the 2013 New York City Pro-Am, which was a loss to Carson, 11–7, 11–9, 11–4.

Rojas had an impressive start to his pro career, as he made it through qualifying in his first IRT event: the 2008 Motorola IRT World Championships in Denver before losing to Álvaro Beltrán in the Round of 16. Later that season, Rojas made the semi-finals at the 2009 California Open before losing to Rocky Carson in four games.

== International career ==
Rojas has been on Team USA six times. Most recently, Rojas competed in the 2015 Pan American Games in Toronto, where he and Jansen Allen won gold in Men's Doubles by defeating Bolivians Conrrado Moscoso and Roland Keller in the final, 15–8, 15–5. He also was a silver medalist in Toronto in the Team competition.

Also, Rojas won gold in singles at the 2014 Pan American Championships by defeating Andres Parrilla of Mexico in the final, 15–4, 15–11, in Santa Cruz, Bolivia, where he also earned a silver medal in doubles with David Horn after losing the final to Mexicans Daniel De La Rosa and Edson Martinez, 14–15, 15–12, 11–1.

Rojas was part of the American gold medal team at the 16th International Racquetball Federation (IRF) World Championships, winning the final for the US by defeating Kris Odegard, 15–14, 15–10, giving the USA a 2–0 win over Canada. Also at the 2012 Worlds, Rojas earned a bronze medal in men's singles by reaching the semi-finals, where he lost to Polo Gutierrez of Mexico, 10–15, 15–12, 11–6.

Rojas was a bronze medalist at the 2014 World Championships in Burlington, Ontario, where he lost to fellow American Rocky Carson, 15–8, 15–12, in the semi-finals.

Rojas's performance at Worlds in 2012 qualified him for the 2013 World Games, where he reached the semi-finals, losing to Gutierrez, 15–9, 8–15, 11–9, and dropping the 3rd place match to Carson, 15–12, 9–15, 11–5.

Rojas's first appearance on Team USA was at the 2008 Pan Am Championships in Costa Rica, where he played singles, losing in the quarter finals to Gutierrez, who was the silver medalist that year.

As a junior player, Rojas won the IRF Junior World Boys U18 title twice, in 2008 and 2009. He's one of only four players to do so, including Sudsy Monchik, Rocky Carson, Jack Huczek and Ben Croft.

== USA Competitions ==
Rojas won the USA Racquetball National Doubles title in 2015 with Allen and 2014 with Carson. In both years, Ben Croft and Tom Fuhrmann were runners up. In 2015, Rojas and Allen defeated Croft and Fuhrmann, 5–15, 15–8, 11–4, and in 2014 Carson and Rojas won the final, 12–15, 15–14, 11–3.

Rojas won the USA Racquetball Boys U18 Championship three times: 2007, 2008 and 2009. He also won the USA Racquetball U18 doubles title in 2008 with Jansen Allen and 2009 with José Serrano.

Rojas attended Delta College and won the USA Racquetball collegiate men's title in 2009 and 2010, and in 2010 also took the doubles title with David Horn.

Rojas is sponsored by Ektelon.

== See also ==
- List of racquetball players
- IRT Website
