= 2012 Racquetball World Championships =

- XVI Racquetball World Championships: Dominican Republic 2012 -
Host	Santo Domingo; Dominican Republic
Dates	August 3–11
- Men's singles
Gold	(United States) Rocky Carson
Silver	(Mexico) Polo Gutierrez
Bronze	(Mexico) Gilberto Mejia, (United States) Jose Rojas
- Women's singles
Gold	(Mexico) Paola Longoria
Silver	(Canada) Jennifer Saunders
Bronze	(United States) Rhonda Rajsich, (United States) Cheryl Gudinas
- Men's doubles
Gold	(Mexico) Álvaro Beltrán & Javier Moreno
Silver	(United States) Jansen Allen & Tony Carson
Bronze	(Bolivia) Ricardo Monroy & Roland Keller, (Guatemala) Pedro Manolo Sandoval & Edwin Galicia
- Women's doubles
Gold	(Mexico) Paola Longoria & Samantha Salas
Silver	(Chile) Angela Grisar & Carla Muñoz
Bronze	(Canada) Josée Grand'Maître & Frédérique Lambert, (United States) Rhonda Rajsich & Aimee Ruiz
- Men's teams
Gold	USA
Silver	Canada
Bronze	Mexico
4th place	Bolivia
- Women's teams
Gold	Mexico
Silver	USA
Bronze	Canada
4th place	Colombia

The 16th Racquetball World Championships were held in Santo Domingo (Dominican Republic) from August 3 to 11, 2012, with players from 22 different countries.

The championships had two parts. Individual competitions for men's and women's singles and doubles took place over the first four days. Following an off day, there was a team competition on the last three days, in which countries competed against each other in a best-of-three match format involving two singles matches and a doubles match.

This was the second time the Racquetball World Championships were held in Santo Domingo. The previous time was in 2006.

The 2012 World Racquetball Championships were also the qualifying event for the 2013 World Games in Cali, Colombia. The top 16 players in Santo Domingo would qualify to compete in Cali. This only applied to men's and women's singles, as the World Games did not have doubles competitions.

== Medal table ==
Rank	Nation	Gold	Silver	Bronze	Total
1	Mexico (MEX)	4	1	2	7
2	United States (USA)	2	2	4	8
3	Canada (CAN)	0	3	1	4
4	Chile (CHI)	0	1	0	1
5	Bolivia (BOL)	0	0	2	2
6	Colombia (COL)	0	0	1	1
6	Guatemala (GUA)	0	0	1	1
Totals (7 entries)		6	7	11	24

== Men's singles ==
First round
33	(India) Ashish Mehta	7, 4
32	(Guatemala) Pedro Manolo Sandoval	15, 15
41	(Panama) Ricardo Delgado	15, 15
24	(Republic of Ireland) Gary Lynch	3, 8
25	(Spain) Agustin Tristan	15, 15
40	(Honduras) David Matamores	8, 2
37	(Nicaragua) Ernesto Centeno	Forfeit
28	(Chile) Francisco Troncoso
21
44
45
20
29	(Argentina) Staniago Ugalde	11, 13
36	(Puerto Rico) Miguel Santiago	15, 15
35	(Nicaragua) Luciano Garcia	14, 13
30	(Guatemala) Christian Wer	15, 15
43
22
27	(Argentina) Shai Manzuri	15, 15
38	(Honduras) Rolando Bier	5, 6
39	(England) Timothy Baghurst	5, 7
26	(Chile) Santiago Canedo	15, 15
23	(Ecuador) Jose Daniel Ugalde	15, 15
42	(Panama) Cesar Dominguez	3, 5
31	(India) Venkat Vejju	15, 10, 10
34	(Puerto Rico) Abraham Mercado	14, 15, 11

Second round
1	(United States) Rocky Carson	15, 15
33	(Guatemala) Pedro Manolo Sandoval	1, 3
17	(South Korea) Daeyong Kwon	10, 8
16	(Colombia) Alejandro Herrera	15, 15
9	(Venezuela) Cesar Castillo	15, 7, 11
24	(Panama) Ricardo Delgado	14, 15, 8
25	(Spain) Agustin Tristan	15, 15
8	(Japan) Takaaki Hirose	5, 3
5	(Canada) Kris Odegard	15, 15
37	(Chile) Francisco Troncoso	6, 8
21	(Ecuador) Fernando Rios	15, 15
12	(Bolivia) Kadim Carrasco	4, 2
13	(Dominican Republic) Luis Pérez	13, 8
20	(Costa Rica) Felipe Camacho Martin	15, 15
29	(Argentina) Staniago Ugalde	4, 11
4	(Mexico) Gilberto Mejia	15, 15
3	(United States) Jose Rojas	15, 15
30	(Guatemala) Christian Wer	6, 12
19	(South Korea) Mingyu Kim	8, 6
14	(Colombia) Juan Sebastian Herrera	15, 15
11	(Venezuela) Luis Reveron	15, 15
22	(Republic of Ireland) Stephen O'Loan	0, 2
27	(Argentina) Shai Manzuri	15, 15
6	(Japan) Michimune Kono	8, 7
7	(Canada) Tim Landeryou	14, 15, 11
26	(Chile) Santiago Canedo	15, 1, 6
23	(Ecuador) Jose Daniel Ugalde	7, 15, 1
10	(Bolivia) Carlos Keller	15, 13, 11
15	(Dominican Republic) Junior Rodríguez	11, 6
18	(Costa Rica) Teobaldo Fumero Adams	15, 15
34	(Puerto Rico) Abraham Mercado	0, 0
2	(Mexico) Polo Gutiérrez	15, 15

Third round
1	(United States) Rocky Carson	15, 15
16	(Colombia) Alejandro Herrera	5, 8
9	(Venezuela) Cesar Castillo	9, 13
25	(Spain) Augustin Tristan	15, 15
5	(Canada) Kris Odegard	8, 15, 11
(Ecuador) Fernando Rios	15, 10, 4
20	(Costa Rica) Felipe Camacho Martin	9, 7
4	(Mexico) Gilberto Mejia	15, 15
3	(United States) José Rojas	15, 15
14	(Colombia) Juan Sebastian Herrera	5, 10
11	(Venezuela) Luis Reveron	6, 13
27	(Argentina) Shai Manzuri	15, 15
7	(Canada) Tim Landeryou	13, 4
10	(Bolivia) Carlos Keller	15, 15
18	(Costa Rica) Teobaldo Fumero Adams	1, 2
2	(Mexico) Polo Gutiérrez	15, 15

Quarterfinals
1	(United States) Rocky Carson	15, 15
25	(Spain) Agustin Tristan	5, 4
5	(Canada) Kris Odegard	4, 8
4	(Mexico) Gilberto Mejía	15, 15
3	(United States) José Rojas	15, 7, 11
27	(Argentina) Shai Manzuri	5, 15, 10
10	(Bolivia) Carlos Keller	8, 10
2	(Mexico) Polo Gutiérrez	15, 15

Semifinals
1	(United States) Rocky Carson	15, 15
4	(Mexico) Gilberto Mejía	8, 5
3	(United States) José Rojas	15, 12, 6
2	(Mexico) Polo Gutiérrez	10, 15, 11

Final
1	(United States) Rocky Carson	15, 15
2	(Mexico) Polo Gutiérrez	6, 11

Winner
Rocky Carson (United States)

== Women's singles ==
First round
1
64
33	(Spain) Rebeca Tristan	2, 3
32	(Panama) Diana Maura	15, 15
17
48
49
16
9
56
41
24
25
40
57
8
5
60
37
28
21
44
53
12
13
52
45
20
29
36
61
4
3
62
35
30
19
46
51
14
11
54
43
22
27
38
59
6
7
58
39
26
23
42
55
10
15
50
47
18
31	(Argentina) Natalia Corti	2, 8
34	(Panama) Giulia Barboni	15, 15
63
2

Second round
1	(United States) Rhonda Rajsich	15, 15
32	(Panama) Diana Maura	1, 0
17	(Venezuela) Marian Paredes	13, 8
16	(Ecuador) María Cristina Cordova	15, 15
9	(Chile) Angela Grisar	15, 15
24	(Guatemala) María Renee Rodríguez	4, 0
25	(Colombia) Cristina Amaya	14, 15, 5
8	(Japan) Toshiko Sakamoto	15, 8, 11
5	(Mexico) Paola Longoria	15, 15
28	(Puerto Rico) Lisa Lopezcepero	1, 0
21	(Dominican Republic) Claudine García	14, 6
12	(Bolivia) María José Vargas	15, 15
13	(South Korea) Jung Eun Ane	15, 15
20	(Costa Rica) Sofia Soley Saborio	5, 11
29	(Argentina) Véronique Guillemette	15, 11, 8
4	(Canada) Brandi Jacobson Prentice	11, 15, 11
3	(United States) Cheryl Gudinas	15, 15
30	(Honduras) Pamela Sierra	1, 2
19	(Venezuela) Mariana Tobon	2, 7
14	(Ecuador) Maria Paz Muñoz	15, 15
11	(Chile) Carla Muñoz	15, 15
22	(Guatemala) Maria Gomar	13, 2
27	(Colombia) Carolina Gómez	11, 10
6	(Japan) Naomi Wakimoto	15, 15
7	(Mexico) Jessica Parrilla	15, 15
26	(Puerto Rico) Anna Maldonado	2, 6
23	(Dominican Republic) Yira Portes	1, 3
10	(Bolivia) Carola Loma	15, 15
15	(South Korea) Malhee Kwon	13, 7
18	(Costa Rica) Melanie Sauma Masis	15, 15
31	(Panama) Giulia Barboni	3, 2
2	(Canada) Jennifer Saunders	15, 15

Third round
1	(United States) Rhonda Rajsich	15, 15
16	(Ecuador) Maria Cristina Cordova	1, 0
9	(Chile) Angela Grisar	15, 11, 11
8	(Japan) Toshiko Sakamoto	6, 15, 6
5	(Mexico) Paola Longoria	15, 15
12	(Bolivia) María José Vargas	9, 3
13	(South Korea) Jung Eun Ane	15, 13, 11
4	(Canada) Brandi Jacobson Prentice	5, 15, 6
3	(United States) Cheryl Gudinas	15, 15
14	(Ecuador) Maria Paz Muñoz	12, 12
11	(Chile) Carla Muñoz	14, 3
6	(Japan) Naomi Wakimoto	15, 15
7	(Mexico) Jessica Parrilla	15, 15
10	(Bolivia) Carola Loma	13, 14
18	(Costa Rica) Melania Sauma Masis	4, 2
2	(Canada) Jennifer Saunders	15, 15

Quarterfinals
1	(United States) Rhonda Rajsich	15, 15
9	(Chile) Angela Grisar	2, 1
5	(Mexico) Paola Longoria	15, 15
13	(South Korea) Jung Eun Ane	1, 4
3	(United States) Cheryl Gudinas	15, 15
6	(Japan) Naomi Wakimoto	4, 8
7	(Mexico) Jessica Parrilla	6, 9
2	(Canada) Jennifer Saunders	15, 15

Semifinals
1	(United States) Rhonda Rajsich	2, 12
5	(Mexico) Paola Longoria	15, 15
3	(United States) Cheryl Gudinas	15, 13, 5
(Canada) Jennifer Saunders	6, 15, 11

Final
1	(Mexico) Paola Longoria	15, 15
2	(Canada) Jennifer Saunders	11, 2

Winner
Paola Longoria (Mexico)

== Men's doubles ==
Round of 32
1	(United States) Jansen Allen & Tony Carson
17	(Puerto Rico) Migeul Santiago & Abraham Mercado	15, 11, 11
16	(India) Nirup Shetty & Sathwik Rai	9, 15, 1
9	(Chile) Santiago Canedo & Francisco Troncoso
8	(Argentina) Daniel Maggi & Fernando Kurzbard
5	(Japan) Michimune Kono & Hiroshi Shimizu
12	(Dominican Republic) Ramón de León & Junior Rodríguez
13	(Guatemala) Pedro Manolo Sandoval & Edwin Galicia
4	(Venezuela) Luis Reveron & Roberto Santander
3	(Canada) Mike Green & Vincent Gagnon
19	(Panama) Cesar Dominguez & Ricardo Delgado	3, 3
14	(Colombia) Alejandro Herrera & Sebastian Franco	15, 15
11	(South Korea) Sangsoo Lee & Eunbyung Kim
6	(Bolivia) Ricardo Monroy & Roland Keller
7	(Costa Rica) Ivan Villegas & Andres Acuña
10	(Ecuador) Jose Daniel Alvarez & Fernando Rios
15	(Republic of Ireland) Gary Lynch & Stephen O'Loan	6, 7
18	(Honduras) Rolando Bier & David Maramoros	15, 15
(Mexico) Álvaro Beltrán & Javier Moreno

Round of 16
1	(United States) USA	15, 15
17	Puerto Rico	1, 5
9	Chile	8, 14
8	Argentina	15, 15
5	(Japan)	15, 14, 10
12	Dominican Republic	4, 15, 11
13	Guatemala	8, 15, 11
4	Venezuela	15, 11, 9
3	Canada	15, 15
14	Colombia	11, 0
11	South Korea	10, 0
6	Bolivia	15, 15
7	Costa Rica	14, 14
10	Ecuador	15, 15
18	Honduras	7, 6
2	Mexico	15, 15

Quarter finals
1	(United States) USA	15, 15
8	Argentina	5, 6
12	Dominican Republic	9, 6
13	Guatemala	15,15
3	Canada	10, 11
6	Bolivia	15, 15
10	Ecuador	12, 15, 9
2	Mexico	15, 14, 11

Semi finals
1	(United States) USA	15, 15
13	Guatemala	8, 4
6	Bolivia	2, 7
2	Mexico	15, 15

Finals
1	USA	4, 4
2	Mexico	15, 15

Winners
(Mexico) Álvaro Beltrán & Javier Moreno

== Women's doubles ==
Round of 16
1	(United States) Rhonda Rajsich & Aimee Ruiz	15, 15
17	(Panama) Diana Maura & Giulia Barboni	2, 0
9	(Venezuela) Mariana Paredes & Mariana Tobon	4, 9
8	(Ecuador) María Paz Muñoz & María Cristina Cordova	15, 15
5	(Japan) Maiko Satoh & Etsuko Noda	15, 15
12	(Dominican Republic) María Céspedes & Merynanyelly Delgado	3, 1
13	(Puerto Rico) Anna Maldonado & Lisa Lopezcepero	1, 1
4	(Chile) Angela Grisar & Carla Muñoz	15, 15
3	(Canada) Josée Grand'Maître & Frédérique Lambert	15, 15
14	(Argentina) Véronique Guillemette & Natalia Corti	5, 0
11	(Costa Rica) Naomi Sasso Kessler & Deborah Kessler Payne	3, 1
6	(Bolivia) Carola Loma & Jenny Daza	15, 15
7	(South Korea) Malhee Kwon & Mi Ok An	10, 15, 11
10	(Guatemala) María Renee Rodriguez & Gabriela Martinez	15, 14, 7
15	(Colombia) Cristina Amaya & Carolina Gomez	3, 2
2	(Mexico) Paola Longoria & Samantha Salas	15, 15

Quarter finals
1	(United States) USA	15, 15
8	Ecuador	9, 7
5	Japan	9, 11
4	Chile	15, 15
3	Canada	15, 15
6	Bolivia	5, 9
7	South Korea	3, 8
2	Mexico	15, 15

Semi finals
1	USA	14, 15, 10
4	Chile	15, 2, 11
3	Canada	13, 7
2	Mexico	15, 15

Finals
1	Chile	5, 4
2	Mexico	15, 15

Winners
(Mexico) Paola Longoria & Samantha Salas

== Men's team competition ==
Round of 32
1	USA
17	Honduras	2
16	Puerto Rico	1
9	Japan
8	South Korea
5	Venezuela
12	Argentina
13	Guatemala
4	Bolivia
3	Mexico
14	India
11	Dominican Republic
6	Costa Rica
Ecuador
10	(Republic of Ireland) Ireland
15	Colombia	2
18	Panama	0
Canada

Round of 16
1	(United States) USA	2
17	Honduras	0
9	Japan	2
8	South Korea	0
5	Venezuela	1
12	Argentina	2
13	Guatemala	0
4	Bolivia	2
3	Mexico	2
14	India	0
11	Dominican Republic	2
6	Costa Rica	0
7	Ecuador	2
10	(Republic of Ireland) Ireland	0
18	Colombia	0
2	Canada	2

Quarter finals
1	(United States) USA	2
9	Japan	0
12	Argentina	0
4	Bolivia	2
3	Mexico	2
11	Dominican Republic	0
7	Ecuador	0
2	Canada	2

Semi finals
1	(United States) USA	2
4	Bolivia	0
3	Mexico	1
2	Canada	2

Finals
1	(United States) USA	2
2	Canada	0

Winner
United States

== Women's team competition ==
Round of 16
1	(United States) USA	2
16	Panama	0
9	Ecuador	2
8	Venezuela	0
5	Japan	2
12	Costa Rica	1
13	Colombia	2
4	Bolivia	1
3	Mexico	2
14	Argentina	0
11	Dominican Republic	1
6	Chile	2
7	South Korea	1
10	Guatemala	2
15	Puerto Rico	0
2	Canada	2

Quarter finals
1	(United States) USA	2
8	Ecuador	0
5	Japan	0
13	Colombia	2
3	Mexico	2
6	Chile	0
7	Guatemala	0
2	Canada	2

Semifinals
1	(United States) USA	2
13	Colombia	0
3	Mexico	2
2	Canada	1

Final
1	(United States) USA	0
3	Mexico	2

Winner
Mexico

== See also ==
- Racquetball World Championships
