= 1986 Racquetball World Championships =

- III Racquetball World Championships: USA 1986-
Host	Orlando, Florida; United States
Dates	August 4 - August 10
- Men's singles
Gold	(United States) Egan Inoue
Silver	(Canada) Roger Harripersad
Bronze	(Canada) Ross Harvey
4th	(Puerto Rico) Ruben Gonzalez
- Women's singles
Gold	(United States) Cindy Baxter
Silver	(United States) Toni Bevelock
Bronze	(Canada) Crystal Fried
4th	(Canada) Heather Stupp
- Men's doubles
Gold	(United States) Jack Nolan & Todd O'Neil
Silver	(Puerto Rico) Ruben Gonzalez & Willie Rodriguez
Bronze	(Canada) Glen Collard & Joe Kirkwood
4th	(Mexico) Raul Canales & Federico Alvarez
- Women's doubles
Gold	(Canada) Carol McFetridge & Marion Sicotte
Silver	(United States) Connie Peterson & Michelle Gilman
Bronze	(Japan) Yumiko Shimaura & Eriko Watanabe
4th	(Mexico) Diana Almeida & Marta Nance

The International Racquetball Federation's 3rd Racquetball World Championships was held in Orlando, Florida from August 4 to 10, 1986. This was the third time Worlds was held in the USA.

The competition began with the team competition with the US and Canada facing off in both the men's and women's finals. On the men's side, Canada defeated the Americans, In men's singles, Roger Harripersad of Canada beat American Ed Andrews, 15–9, 10–15, 15–11, Ross Harvey (Canada) beat Andy Roberts (USA), 15–10, 15–14, but Egan Inoue (USA) swept Lindsay Meyers (Canada), 15–4, 15–11. In doubles, Americans Jack Nolan and Todd O'Neil defeated the Canadians Glenn Collard and Joe Kirkwood, 13–15, 15–6, 15–6, but the total games were 5-5. The tie-breaker rule was the result of the #1 singles game, which was between Harripersad's defeat of Andrews, so Canada won the men's team title 7–5. It was the first men's team title for Canada.

The American women won the team title by defeating Canada in the final by a total of seven games to five. In the singles matches, Cindy Baxter (USA) defeated Crystal Fried (Canada), 15–11, 11–15, 15–13, Heather Stupp (Canada) beat Toni Bevelock (USA), 2–15, 15–8, 15–1, Malia Kamahoahoa (USA) defeated Lisa Devine (Canada), 11–15, 15–10, 15–8, and in doubles Americans Connie Peterson and Michelle Gilman beat the Canadian team of Carol McFetridge and Manon Sicotte, 13–15, 15–6, 15–2.

With the Canadians winning the men's competition 7-5 and the Americans winning the women's competition 7–5, the two countries tied for the overall title.

Americans won three of the four individual competitions, led by Egan Inoue, winning what would be his first of two World Championships in men's singles. Cindy Baxter won the second of her two career titles in women's singles, and Jack Nolan and Todd O'Neill won men's doubles. Canadians Carol McFetridge and Manon Sicotte prevented the American sweep by winning women's doubles.

== Men's events ==
=== Singles event ===
Quarter-finals
(Canada) Roger Harripersad
(Japan) Yakata Furata
(United States) Andy Roberts	10, 15, 14
(Canada) Ross Harvey	15, 13, 15
(United States) Ed Andrews	9, 9
(United States) Egan Inoue	15, 15
(Canada) Lindsay Meyers
(Puerto Rico) Ruben Gonzalez

Semi-finals
(Canada) Roger Harripersad	15, 15
(Canada) Ross Harvey	9, 2
(United States) Egan Inoue	15, 6, 15
(Puerto Rico) Ruben Gonzalez	15, 6, 15

Final
(Canada) Roger Harripersad	2, 15, 7
(United States) Egan Inoue	15, 7, 15

=== Doubles event ===
Semi-finals
(United States) Jack Nolan & Todd O'Neil
(Mexico) Raul Canales & Federico Alvarez
(Puerto Rico) Ruben Gonzalez & Willie Rodriguez
(Canada) Glen Collard & Joe Kirkwood

Final
(United States) Jack Nolan & Todd O'Neil	15, 15
(Puerto Rico) Ruben Gonzalez & Willie Rodriguez	14, 13

== Women's events ==
=== Singles event ===
Semi-finals
(United States) Toni Bevelock	15, 11, 15
(Canada) Crystal Fried	11, 15, 12
(United States) Cindy Baxter	15, 13, 15
(Canada) Heather Stupp	8, 15, 3

Final
(United States) Cindy Baxter	15, 11, 15
(United States) Toni Bevelock	11, 15, 8

=== Doubles event ===
Semi-finals
(United States) Connie Peterson & Michelle Gilman
(Mexico) Diana Almeida & Marta Nance
(Japan) Yumiko Shimaura & Eriko Watanabe
(Canada) Carol McFetridge & Manon Sicotte

Final
(United States) Connie Peterson & Michelle Gilman	13, 9
(Canada) Carol McFetridge & Manon Sicotte	15, 15

== Team results ==
Final team standings
	Men's team	Women's team	Overall/combined
1	Canada	(United States) USA	(United States) USA & Canada
2	(United States) USA	Canada	-
3	Puerto Rico	Japan	Japan
4	Mexico	Costa Rica	Mexico
5	Japan	(Republic of Ireland) Ireland	Costa Rica & (Republic of Ireland) Ireland
6	Netherlands	(Canada) Mexico	
7	(Republic of Ireland) Ireland	Netherlands	Netherlands
8	Costa Rica	France	Puerto Rico
9	Germany	Colombia	Colombia & France
10	Colombia	Belgium	
11	France	Puerto Rico	Germany
12	Ecuador	Germany	Belgium
13	Dominican Republic	(United Kingdom) Great Britain	(United Kingdom) Great Britain
14	Belgium	-	Ecuador
15	Switzerland	-	Dominican Republic
16	Greece	-	Switzerland
17	Venezuela	-	Greece
18	Panama	-	Venezuela
19	(United Kingdom) Great Britain	-	Panama
20	Bolivia	-	Bolivia
