= Rocky Carson =

American racquetball player

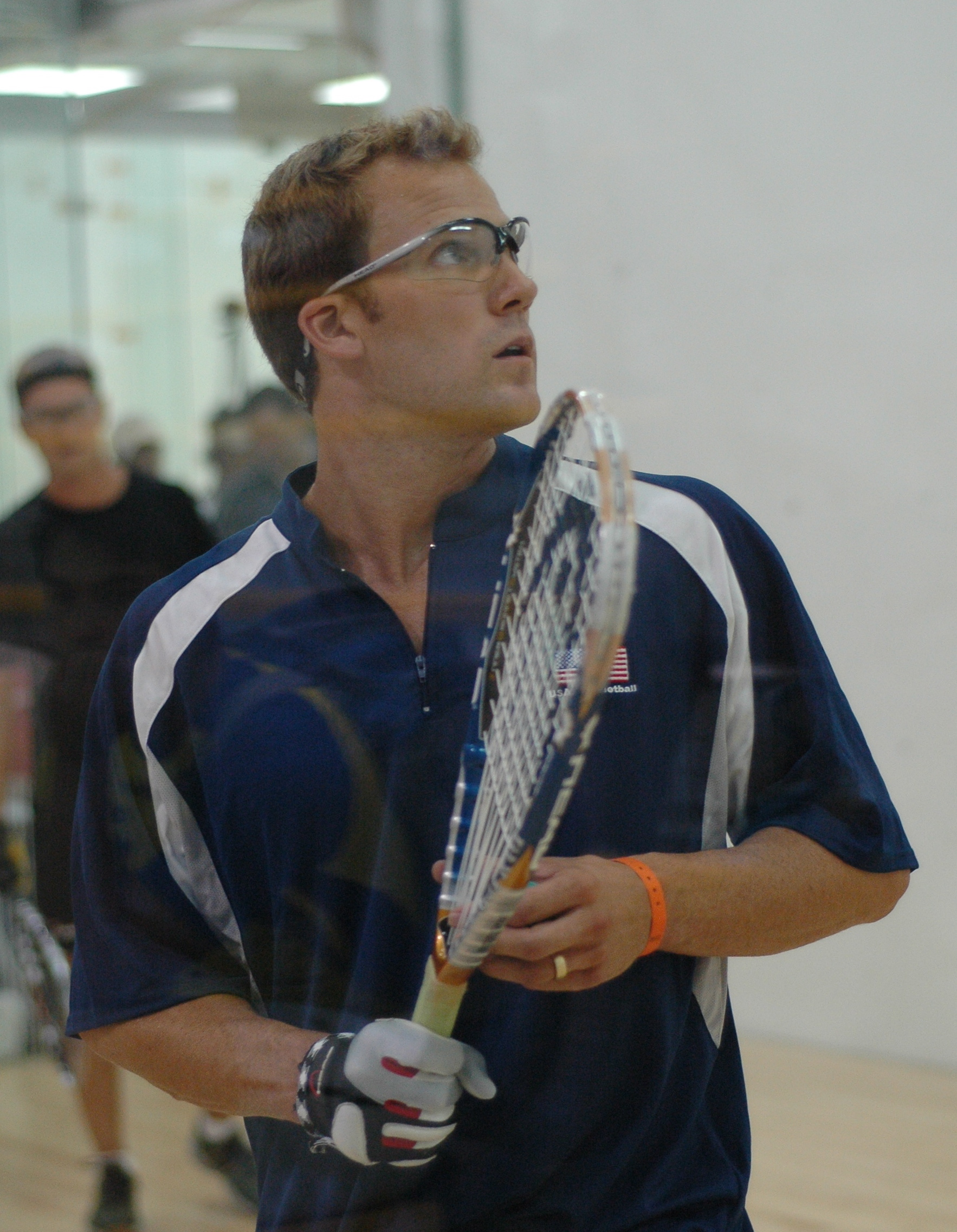
- Carson at 2006 World Championships

Personal information
- Nationality: American
- Born: May 21, 1979 (age 47) Newport Beach, California, U.S.
- Height: 6 ft (183 cm)
- Weight: 175 lb (79 kg)

Sport
- Sport: Racquetball
- College team: Saddleback College
- Turned pro: 1998
- Coached by: Fran Davis

Achievements and titles
- World finals: 1st Men's Singles: 2008, 2010, 2012, 2014, 2016
- National finals: 1st Men's Singles: 2000, 2003, 2006, 2008, 2010, 2016, 2017, 2021; 1st Men's Doubles: 2004, 2006, 2008, 2009, 2011, 2012, 2014, 2017–2019, 2021
- Highest world ranking: No. 1: 2007–08 & 2017–18
Medal record
Men's racquetball
Representing United States
Event	1st	2nd	3rd
Pan American Games	2	2	3
World Championships	7	4	3
World Games	0	1	1
Pan American Championships	1	0	1
Total	10	7	8
Pan American Games
Bronze medal – third place	2019 Lima	Doubles
Bronze medal – third place	2019 Lima	Team
Gold medal – first place	2015 Toronto	Singles
Silver medal – second place	2015 Toronto	Team
Gold medal – first place	2011 Guadalajara	Singles
Silver medal – second place	2011 Guadalajara	Team
Bronze medal – third place	2003 Santo Domingo	Singles
Racquetball World Championships
Silver medal – second place	2022 San Luis Potosí	Singles
Bronze medal – third place	2022 San Luis Potosí	Team
Silver medal – second place	2018 San José	Doubles
Gold medal – first place	2016 Cali	Singles
Gold medal – first place	2014 Burlington	Singles
Gold medal – first place	2012 Santo Domingo	Singles
Gold medal – first place	2012 Santo Domingo	Team
Gold medal – first place	2010 Seoul	Singles
Gold medal – first place	2008 Kingscourt	Singles
Silver medal – second place	2006 Santo Domingo	Doubles
Gold medal – first place	2006 Santo Domingo	Team
Bronze medal – third place	2004 Anyang	Singles
Silver medal – second place	2000 Mexico	Singles
Bronze medal – third place	1998 Bolivia	Singles
World Games
Silver medal – second place	2009 Kaohsiung	Singles
Bronze medal – third place	2013 Cali	Singles
Pan American Championships
Gold medal – first place	2001 San Pedro Sula	Singles
Bronze medal – third place	2002 Cochabamba	Singles

Rocky Carson (born May 21, 1979) is an American professional racquetball player. Carson has won a record 5 International Racquetball Federation (IRF) World Championships in Men's Singles, and 2 Pan American Games gold medals in singles. He was the #1 player on the International Racquetball Tour (IRT) in 2007-08 & 2017–18. Carson has also played outdoor racquetball, and in 2008, he became the first man to win Men's Singles at the World Outdoor Championship, as well as the indoor IRF World Championship, and US Open. Carson has won 27 International Racquetball Tour (IRT) titles and has been ranked in the top 10 for a record 23 seasons.

== Junior years ==
Carson played multiple sports as a boy, and was good at several: baseball, basketball and tennis. But he had a passion for racquetball. That passion led to Carson playing a lot of racquetball as a junior, and doing so successfully. He won Boys' Singles in several age categories at the USA Racquetball Junior Olympics. Carson's first title was in U10 in 1990. In 1992, he began a streak of five consecutive titles with a win in U12, followed by two U14 wins in 1993 and 1994, and two wins in U16 in 1995 and 1996. Carson's final US junior title was a win in U18 in 1998.

Carson won two US junior doubles titles in U18. He and Tyler Siggins won in 1997, and he won with Josh Tucker in 1998.

Carson also successfully competed several times at the International Racquetball Federation (IRF) World Junior Championships. He won Boy's U16 Singles and Doubles (with Ryan Staten) in 1995. Then Carson won Boy's U18 Singles three consecutive years: 1996–1998, becoming the second boy to do so after Sudsy Monchik.

Carson attended Saddleback College, and he competed for that school at the 1998 USA Racquetball Intercollegiate Championships, winning the Men's #1 title.

== 1998 to 2006 – Career begins ==
Carson played on Team USA for the first time at the 1998 Racquetball World Championships (Worlds) in Cochabamba, Bolivia, where he finished with a bronze medal in Men's Singles, and gold in the Men's Team event.

Carson was a quarterfinalist at the USAR 1998 National Doubles Championships in October 1998 in Baltimore. He and James Mulcock lost to Doug Ganim and Dan Obremski – a two time World Championship team, 15–7, 5–15, 11–7. Ganim was complementary to Carson saying "We pretty much kept it away from Rocky, but when he got his racquet on it, he put it away about every time."

Carson began to play the International Racquetball Tour tournaments in the 1998–99 season. He'd played a few events in previous seasons – including the first US Open Racquetball Championships in 1996, when he lost to Michael Bronfeld in the Round of 32 – but in 98-99 he played most of the tournaments, and finished 11th on tour. Carson reached a semi-final in that first season, when he lost to Sudsy Monchik in the semis in Rochester, New York.

The following season, 1999–2000, Carson made the quarterfinals at the US Open for the first time, losing to Cliff Swain, 11–3, 11–8, 11–9. Carson's second semi-final happened in his second season in Las Vegas, when he lost to John Ellis, 11–6, 11–5, 10–12, 11–5. He played in seven events in all, and finished in the top 10 at the end of the season for the first time in 7th position.

In 2000, Carson won the USA Racquetball National Singles Championship for the first time. He was seeded 6th, and defeated 8th seed Doug Eagle in the final. 15–7, 15–7. To reach the final, Carson beat Brian Fredenberg in the quarterfinals, 15–7, 15–13, and Jack Huczek in the semi-finals, 15–11, 15–6.

He also played in Worlds for the 2nd time in San Luis Potosí, Mexico, and came home with two silver medals. He finished 2nd in Men's Singles, as he lost the final to Mexican Álvaro Beltrán, 15–10, 12–15, 11–6, and the USA men were 2nd in the Men's Team event.

Carson and James Mulcock finished in the quarterfinals at the 2000 USAR National Doubles Championships in Baltimore, where they lost to Todd O'Neill and Derek Robinson, 15–11, 15–13.

In 2000–2001, Carson reached two IRT finals. First in February 2001 at the Michael Lanning Pro-Am in Minneapolis, he beat Jack Huczek in the quarterfinals, John Ellis in the semi-finals, before losing to Monchik in the final, 12–10, 11–7, 11–5. Then at the Howard McKahand Memorial Pro-Am in Coral Springs, Florida, Carson reached the final by defeating Derek Robinson in the quarters, Swain in the semis, and then lost to final to Ellis, 11–9, 11–8, 10–12, 11–9. He finished ranked 5th at the end of the IRT season.

Carson won the 2001 Pan American Racquetball Championships in San Pedro Sula, Honduras, where he defeated Canadian Kane Waselenchuk in the final, 15–9, 15–13.

Carson was the defending champion at the 2001 USAR National Singles Championships, and had a chance to defend the title, but lost to Jack Huczek, 15–11, 15–6, in the final. Carson beat Dan Fowler in the semi-finals, 15–8, 15–10, to reach the final.

Carson took a step back in 2001–2002, as he didn't reach an IRT final, and was only in one semi-final, which led to a season ending ranking of 7th. But in 2002–03, Carson won his first IRT event: the North Carolina Open in Greensboro in March 2003. Carson beat Swain in the quarterfinals, Mike Green in the semi-finals, and Jason Mannino in the final, 13–11, 11–9, 11–3. The win helped him finish 6th at the end of the season.

In 2003, Carson won his 2nd USA National Singles Championship. He had to come back from a game down, and fight off match point in the tie-breaker to defeat Jack Huczek in the final, 6–15, 15–12, 11–10. The win qualified Carson as part of Team USA for the 2003 Pan American Games.

Carson competed in Men's Singles at the 2003 Pan Am Games, and finished with a bronze medal. He lost to team-mate Huczek in the semi-finals, 11–15, 15–12, 11–6. The two Americans were on the same side of the draw, as Carson lost one of his preliminary round matches to Canadian Mike Green, 15–14, 10–15, 11–9.

Carson's second IRT win happened about a year after his first, as he won the Kentucky Pro-Am in Louisville in March 2004. Carson defeated Swain in the quarters, Monchik in the semis, and once again beat Mannino in the final, 11–9, 13–15, 11–5, 8–11, 11–7. He was in two other finals that season, 2003–04, and finished the season with a career high ranking of 4th.

Carson was part of Team USA for the World Championships for the third time in 2004, when they played in Anyang, South Korea. He earned a bronze medal in Men's Singles, and helped the Men's Team win gold. In singles, Carson lost in the semi-finals to Mexican Álvaro Beltrán, 15–10, 15–12. In the team event, the USA beat Mexico in the semi-finals and then Canada in the final.

In 2004, Carson won the USAR National Doubles Championships for the first time, when he partnered with Jack Huczek in October in Tempe, Arizona. They won the title by defeating Jason Thoerner and Mitch Williams, 15–9, 15–14, in the final. They reached the final by beating Chris Crowther and Josh Tucker in the semis, 15–3, 15–11.

However, on the IRT, Carson again took a step back, as he only made one final over the next two seasons: 2004–05 and 2005–06, finishing those seasons ranked 5th and 6th, respectively.

Carson was runner up to Huczek at the 2005 USAR National Singles Championships. He got to the final by defeating Andy Hawthorne in the semi-finals, 15–6, 15–2. In the final, Carson won the first game, but Huczek came back to win the next two, taking the match, 11–15, 15–9, 11–9.

== 2006 to 2017 – Career prime ==
The prime of Carson's career began in 2006, when Carson won US National Singles for the 3rd time, and again it was Jack Huczek that he met in the final. As in 2003, Carson needed a tie-breaker to defeat his long time rival, 15–10, 13–15, 11–3. Carson reached the final by defeating Jason Thoerner in the semi-finals, 15–4, 15–5.

For the first time in his career, Carson played doubles at an international event, as he partnered with Huczek for Men's Doubles at the 2006 World Championships in Santo Domingo, Dominican Republic. There they lost to Mexico's Álvaro Beltrán and Javier Moreno in the final, 15–8, 15–14, but the USA did win the Men's Team event, and Carson contributed as he and Huczek beat Canada's Mike Green and Brian Istace, 15–2, 15–4, in the Team final.

He and Huczek also played together in the 2006 USAR National Doubles Championship in October, and they won the title by defeating Andy Hawthorne and Jeff Stark in the final. They got to the final with a win over Jeff Bell and Doug Ganim in the semi-finals.

In February 2007, Carson won his 3rd IRT event, as he beat Huczek in the final of the Seattle Open, 11–3, 11–6, 4–11, 12–14, 11–3. That was the highlight of his 2006–07 IRT season, which saw Carson in six finals and seven semi-finals, and finish with a career best ranking of #3 at season's end.

As defending champion, Carson was seeded 1st for the 2007 USAR National Singles Championships, but he lost in the semi-finals of eventual winner Mitch Williams. It was an unusual year, because 2nd seed Jack Huczek lost in the other semi-final to Shane Vanderson. Carson's loss is the only time he has lost in a semi-final at National Singles.

Nonetheless, Carson went on to have his best IRT season in 2007–08, when he won seven tournaments, was runner up in four others and finished the season ranked #1. The highlight was winning the 2007 US Open. In that event, Carson defeated Andy Hawthorne in the quarterfinals, Jason Mannino in the semis, and Jack Huczek in the final, 11–3, 7–11, 11–8, 11–6.

Building on his IRT success, Carson defeated Huczek again in the final of the 2008 USAR National Singles Championships, winning the event for a fourth time. That win put Carson on Team USA for the 2008 World Championships in Kingscourt, Ireland, where Carson won Men's Singles for the first time. Once again, it was Huczek who he faced in the final, and again they went to a tie-breaker. Carson won it after facing match points in both the second game and the breaker, 12–15, 15–14, 11–10.

Carson won two events during the 2008–09 IRT season, and the decrease was primarily due to Kane Waselenchuk's return to the tour after two years away due to suspension. They met in the first final of season: the 2008 Motorola IRT World Championships in Denver, and Waselenchuk won in a tie-breaker, 11–6, 11–6, 8–11, 8–11, 11–1. They played eight more times during the season with Waselenchuk winning all of the matches. Nevertheless, Carson finished #2 on the IRT that season.

In 2009, Carson was in both the US National Doubles Championship final and the US National Singles Championship final, and both ended with 11–10 tie-breakers. He and Jack Huczek won doubles against Ben Croft and Mitch Williams, 15–9, 7–15, 11–10, but he lost to the singles final to Huczek, 7–15, 15–9, 11–10. Carson got to the final with a win over Chris Crowther in the semi-finals, 15–7, 15–10.

Carson's Men's Singles World Championship in 2008 qualified him for the 2009 World Games in Kaohsiung, Republic of China, where he captured the silver medal in Men's Singles. Carson beat Canadian Mike Green, 15–9, 15–9, in the quarterfinals, and Mexican Álvaro Beltrán in the semi-finals, 9–15, 15–7, 11–8, to set up another showdown with countryman Jack Huczek. As usual, the two Americans went to a tie-breaker with Huczek coming out on top, 2–15, 15–12, 11–8.

In 2009–2010, Carson didn't win an IRT event for the first time in three seasons. He was in two finals, losing both to Waselenchuk. Still, Carson was able to finish ranked 3rd that season.

Carson lost in the final of the 2010 US National Doubles Championships with partner Josh Tucker to Ben Croft and Mitch Williams, 15–13, 15–8. But Carson did win the 2010 US National Singles Championship. He played Jack Huczek in the final, but this time didn't need a tie-breaker to defeat his rival, winning 15–11, 15–5.

The US Singles Championship title qualified Carson for the US Team for the 2010 World Championships in Seoul, South Korea, where he was the defending champion in Men's Singles. Carson successfully defended his title by defeating Huczek in the final, 15–13, 15–14, to win his 2nd World Championship. He beat Bolivian Ricardo Monroy in the semi-finals, 15–13, 15–12.

Carson was back in the IRT winner's circle in the 2010–2011 season, as he defeated Álvaro Beltrán, 11–2, 11–6, 11–8, in the Chihuahua, Mexico to win the Corona Open. Carson was in 11 other finals that season, and 12 finals in one IRT season remains a career best for him. Ten of those finals were losses to Kane Waselenchuk (the other was versus Jack Huczek), so the tour was really a Waselenchuk-Carson show that season. Carson finished the season #2.

Carson and Huczek won USAR National Doubles in 2011, as they defeated Chris Crowther and Shane Vanderson in the final, 15–7, 5–15, 11–10. They beat Andy Hawthorne and Jose Rojas in the semi-finals, 15–13, 15–10. The 2011 USAR National Singles Championships had an IRT division, which Carson competed in rather than the US Team Qualifying Division. In the IRT division, Carson lost in the final to Waselenchuk.

Carson was on Team USA for the 2011 Pan American Games in Guadalajara, Mexico, where he won gold in Men's singles. Carson beat Mexican Gilberto Mejia, 15–1, 15–13, in the final, and Mexican Álvaro Beltrán in the semi-finals, 15–12, 15–12. In the Men's Team event, the USA finished 2nd to Mexico. In the final, Carson again defeated Mejia, but Beltran defeated Chris Crowther, and in doubles Beltran and Javier Moreno defeated Crowther and Shane Vanderson, so Mexico won gold by 2 matches to 1.

Carson won one IRT event in the 2011–2012 season. His win was over Kane Waselenchuk in the 2012 New York City Pro-Am, as Waselenchuk was injured during the final. Carson was in six other finals, including the 2011 US Open, which he lost to Waselenchuk, 7–11, 11–2, 11–4, 11–7. Carson again finished the season #2.

In 2012 for the second consecutive year and sixth overall, Carson won National Doubles, but this was the first time he won with someone other than Jack Huczek. He teamed up with Ben Croft, and they defeated Chris Crowther and Shane Vanderson in the final, 15–7, 15–4. They defeated Tony Carson (no relation) and Charlie Pratt in the semi-finals, 15–4, 10–15, 11–6. In the IRT division of USAR National Singles Championships, Carson lost in the semi-finals to Álvaro Beltrán, 3–11, 12–10, 11–13, 11–8, 11–5.

Carson went to the 2012 World Championships in Santo Domingo, Dominican Republic as the 2 time defending Men's Singles champion. He won the title for the 3rd time by defeating Mexican Polo Gutierrez, 15–6, 15–11, in the final, which was the first time Carson didn't face Jack Huczek in the final, as Huczek retired in 2011.

He was a multiple winner on the IRT in the 2012–13 season, when Carson won three times. He beat Álvaro Beltrán, 11–7, 11–3, 5–11, 9–11, 11–8, to win the 2012 New Jersey Open, defeated Jose Rojas, 11–7, 11–9, 11–4, to win the 2013 New York Pro-Am, and got a win over Kane Waselenchuk in the final of the Mile High Pro-Am in Denver, where Waselenchuk had to retire due to injury with Carson up 2–1 in games. Overall, Carson finished #2 to Waselenchuk in the season ending rankings.

Carson and Ben Croft were the defending champions going into the 2013 USAR National Doubles Championships, but they lost in the semi-finals to eventual winners Jansen Allen and Tony Carson, 15–7, 15–14. The 2013 USAR National Singles Championships had an IRT division, which Carson competed in rather than the US Team Qualifying Division. In the IRT division, Carson lost in the final to Waselenchuk, 11–1, 11–2, 11–3. He got to the final by defeating Croft in the semis, 11–7, 11–5, 12–10, and Daniel De La Rosa in the quarters, 11–4, 11–1, 11–7.

The 2012 World Championship Men's Singles title qualified Carson for the 2013 World Games in Cali, Colombia. However, in Cali, Carson lost to Mexican Gilberto Mejia, 15–10, 9–15, 11–9, in the semi-finals, which was a measure of revenge for Mejia, who Carson beat in the semi-finals at Worlds in 2012. Carson did win the bronze medal match against fellow American Jose Rojas, 15–12, 9–15, 11–5.

Carson won one tournament during the 2013–14 IRT season, which was the 23rd Annual Turkey Shoot in Garden City, Kanas, where he defeated Álvaro Beltrán in the final, 11–7, 10–12, 11–4, 1–11, 11–6. He was runner up in five other events, four times to Kane Waselenchuk and once to Jose Rojas. Carson was again the #2 ranked player on the IRT at season's end.

Carson and Rojas teamed up for the 2014 USAR National Doubles Championships, and won the title by defeating his former partner Ben Croft and Thomas Fuhrmann in the final, 12–15, 15–14, 11–3. Carson didn't play singles in the 2014 USAR National Singles Championships.

Carson's IRT ranking put him on Team USA for the 2014 World Championships in Burlington, Ontario, Canada. He came in as the 3 time World Champion in Men's Singles, and captured the title for a 4th time by defeating Bolivian Conrrado Moscoso, 15–3, 15–8, in the Men's Singles final. Four wins set a record, as Carson moved ahead of Jack Huczek, who won 3 Men's Singles titles. In the semi-finals, Carson beat team-mate Jose Rojas, 15–8, 15–12.

In the 2014–15 IRT season, Carson was in 11 finals – tied for second best in his career – and won three times, leading to a #2 ranking. Carson's final wins were against Álvaro Beltrán twice – in St. Louis and in Davison, Michigan – and once against Ben Croft in Garden City, Kansas.

Carson didn't play in either the 2015 USAR National Doubles Championships or the 2015 USAR National Singles Championships.

But Carson's IRT ranking put him on Team USA for the 2015 Pan American Games in Toronto. He was the defending Pan Am Games gold medalist in Men's singles having won four years earlier in Guadalajara, Mexico. Carson successfully defended his gold medal by defeating Mexican Daniel De La Rosa in the semi-finals, 15–14, 15–8, and Mexican Álvaro Beltrán in the final, 15–11, 15–10. However, as in Guadalajara, Mexico got the better of the US in the Men's Team final, so Carson was a silver medalist in that event.

Carson won three times during the 2015–16 IRT season, and finished the season #2 for the sixth consecutive season. He defeated Jose Rojas in Davison, Michigan, 11–2, 11–2, 11–8; he beat Álvaro Beltrán in Huber Heights, Ohio, 11–7, 9–11, 11–6, 8–11, 11–9; Carson came back from 0-2 down to win against Daniel De La Rosa in Sarasota, Florida, 5–11, 7–11, 11–8, 11–4, 11–1.

At the 2016 USAR National Doubles Championships, Carson played with Jansen Allen, and they reached the finals by defeating Anthony Herrera and David Horn in the semi-finals, 15–9, 15–3. But in the final Carson and Allen lost to Jake Bredenbeck and Jose Diaz, 15–14, 15–11. He won the 2016 USAR National Singles Championships in Highlands Ranch, Colorado, where Carson defeated Chris Crowther in the semi-finals, 13–15, 15–12, 11–7, and then beat Diaz in the final, 15–10, 15–2.

Those results put Carson on Team USA for the 2016 Racquetball World Championships in Cali, Colombia, where he was the 4-time defending champion in Men's Singles. Once again Carson successfully defended his title, winning Men's Singles for a record extending 5th time. In the semi-finals, Carson faced Conrrado Moscoso of Bolivia, who he had beaten in the final two years before in two straight games. This time he needed a tie-breaker to get past the Bolivian, 15–12, 12–15, 11–4. In the final, Carson also needed three games to defeat Mexican Daniel De La Rosa, 15–11, 5–15, 11–5, and win his 5th title.

Carson finished as the #2 player on the IRT for a 7th season in 2016–17. That season he was in six finals, and won once, when he defeated De La Rosa in Dayton, Ohio, 12–10, 11–9, 9–11, 11–8. Carson faced Kane Waselenchuk in the other finals, and Waselenchuk won all of them en route to finishing #1.

Carson switched partners for the 2017 USAR National Doubles Championships, partnering with Jose Diaz, who had been part of the team (with Jake Bredenbeck) that defeated Carson the year before, when he played with Jansen Allen. It was a successful change, as Carson and Diaz won the final, coming back from a game down to narrowly defeat the brother team of Jose Rojas and Marco Rojas, 4–15, 15–12, 11–10. In the semi-finals, Carson and Diaz beat Robert Collins and David Horn, 15–10, 15–10.

At the 2017 USAR National Singles Championships, Carson won the US Team Qualifying division by defeating Horn in the final, 15–8, 15–7. In the semi-finals, he faced doubles partner Diaz, and needed three games to win, 15–7, 11–15, 11–1.

== 2018–present – Surprises ==
The 2017–18 IRT season was a strange one for Carson. In the first part of the season, Carson was runner up to Kane Waselenchuk in the first four events of the season, including the 2017 US Open. But Carson wasn't in another final until the last event of the season in Sarasota, Florida, where he also lost to Waselenchuk, 15–5, 15–4.

Nonetheless, Carson finished as the #1 IRT player in 2017–18, as Waselenchuk was hurt for most of the second half of the season. In Waselenchuk's absence five other players won events – Daniel De La Rosa, Charlie Pratt, Sebastian Franco, Andree Parrilla, and Alejandro Landa, who won twice. Yet none of those players were consistent enough pass Carson in the rankings, who surprisingly finished #1 despite not winning an IRT event. The kicker was that Carson missed the San Antonio event in March 2018, which was the first time he hadn't played an IRT event since September 2000, a streak of 216 events over more than 17 years. Still, Carson was #1 for the first time since 2007–08.

For the 5th time in as many events, Carson had a new doubles partner for the 2018 USAR National Doubles Championships, when he partnered with Sudsy Monchik. They won the championship by defeating Adam Manilla and Nicholas Riffel in the semi-finals, 8–15, 15–13, 11–8, and David Horn and Mauro Rojas in the final, 15–14, 15–8. The win secured a spot on Team USA at the 2018 World Championships for Carson and Monchik, so Carson didn't play in the 2018 USAR National Singles Championships.

Thus, surprisingly rather than trying to win a 6th World Championship in Men's Singles, Carson played Men's Doubles with Monchik at the 2018 World Championships in San José, Costa Rica. They were runners up in Men's Doubles, losing to Mexicans Álvaro Beltrán and Daniel De La Rosa in the final, 10–15, 15–9, 11–2. Carson and Monchik got to the final by defeating Colombians Sebastian Franco and Mario Mercado in the quarterfinals, 15–11, 15–13, and Canadians Tim Landeryou and Samuel Murray, 15–12, 15–2, in the semi-finals.

Carson got a good start to the 2018–19 IRT season, as he won the opening event in Laurel, Maryland, where he defeated Samuel Murray in the final, 15–7, 15–12. Carson beat Sebastian Franco in the semi-finals, 15–8, 15–12.

For the third year running, Carson won the USAR National Doubles Championship, and did so with a third different partner and sixth different partner over six events. In 2019, he teamed up with Charlie Pratt to win the title. They won the final in three games over Jake Bredenbeck and Jose Diaz, 15–8, 5–15, 11–7. Winning doubles qualified Carson for Team USA for the 2019 Pan American Games, so Carson didn't compete at the 2019 USA Racquetball National Singles Championships.

Carson's USA Doubles streak stopped in 2020, when he and Pratt played at the 2020 USAR Doubles Championship in Tempe, Arizona, where they lost in the semi-finals to eventual champions Alejandro Landa and Sudsy Monchik, 8–15, 15–9, 11–9. However, they were able to regain the title in 2021, when they defeated brothers Jake Bredenbeck and Sam Bredenbeck, 12–15, 15–4, 11–8. In 2021, Carson also won USA Racquetball's Men's Singles Championship, defeating Landa in the final, 15–12, 15–13.

In 2022, USA Racquetball had their singles and doubles championships together. In singles, Carson won the title by defeating Adam Manilla in the semi-finals, 11-8, 11-8, 12-10, and Alejandro Landa in the final, 11-9, 9-11, 11-4, 11-7. In doubles, he and Charlie Pratt won the title by defeating Manilla and David Horn, 11-5, 11-8, 7-11, 11-5, in the semi-finals, and Jake Bredenbeck and Sam Bredenbeck, 9-11, 11-4, 11-6, 13-11, in the final.

Carson played at the 2022 World Championships in San Luis Potosi, Mexico, where he reached the Men's Singles final by defeating Bolivian Carlos Keller, 11-8, 11-5, 10-12, 11-4, in the quarterfinals, Costa Rican Andrés Acuña, 8-11, 7-11, 11-7, 12-10, 11-4, in the semi-finals, but lost to Bolivian Conrrado Moscoso, 8-11, 11-7, 11-4, 11-8. It was Carson's sixth Men's Singles final at Worlds (a record), and his first loss. In the Men's Team event, the USA lost to Mexico in the semi-finals with Carson losing the deciding singles match to Daniel De La Rosa, 3-0.

For the fifth year running, Carson and Pratt played doubles at the USA Racquetball Doubles Championships, and in 2023 they lost in the semi-finals to Wayne Antone and Adam Manilla, 13-11, 6-11, 9-11, 13-11, 11-8.

== Career summary ==
Carson has been in 105 IRT finals, winning 27 times over 274 tournaments (as of February 1, 2024). His wins include the 2007 US Open Championship. Twice Carson has been the #1 IRT player at season's end, only five other players have been #1 multiple times: Kane Waselenchuk (13), Cliff Swain (6), Sudsy Monchik (5), Mike Yellen (5) and Daniel De La Rosa.

He has won 9 USA Racquetball National Singles titles, and 12 USA Racquetball National Doubles titles, winning with Jack Huczek (5 wins), Charlie Pratt (3), Ben Croft, Jose Diaz, Sudsy Monchik, and Jose Rojas.

Playing for Team USA, Carson has won gold five times in Men's Singles at the World Championships, which is a record, and twice in Men's Singles at the Pan American Games, which is also a record, and once in Men's Singles at the Pan American Championships. He's played Men's Doubles on Team USA three times: twice at the World Championships (with Jack Huczek in 2006, and with Sudsy Monchik, 2018), which resulted in silver medals, and once with Charles Pratt at the 2019 Pan Am Games in Lima, where they earned bronze medals.

=== Career record ===
This table lists Carson's results across annual events.

Event	1996	1997	1998	1999	2000	2001	2002	2003	2004	2005	2006	2007	2008	2009	2010	2011	2012	2013	2014	2015	2016	2017	2018	2019	2020	2021	2022	2023
US Open	32		16	QF	QF	QF	QF	16	SF	SF	F	W	F	QF	16	F	F	F	SF	SF	F	F	SF	16	P	QF	QF	-
USAR National Singles	-	-	-	-	W	F	-	W	?	F	W	SF	W	F	W	*	*	*	-	-	W	W	-	-	P	W	W	-
USAR National Doubles			QF		QF	-	-	-	W	?	W	-	W	W	2	W	W	SF	W	-	F	W	W	W	SF	W	W	QF
IRT Ranking			30	11	7	5	7	6	4	5	6	3	1	2	3	2	2	2	2	2	2	2	1	2	3	8	9	20

Note: W = winner, F = finalist, SF = semi-finalist, QF = quarterfinalist, 16 = Round of 16. Also, the USA Racquetball National Singles Championships had an IRT division from 2012 to 2014, so Carson competed in that rather than the top USAR division. P = Pandemic.

== See also ==
- List of racquetball players

Sporting positions
Preceded by Jack Huczek; Kane Waselenchuk	Number 1 Men's Pro Racquetball Player; 2007–2008; 2017–2018	Succeeded by Kane Waselenchuk; Kane Waselenchuk
