= Racquetball World Championships =

International racquetball competition

The World Racquetball Championships is the top international racquetball competition organized by the International Racquetball Federation (IRF).

== History ==
The first event was held in 1981 as part of the 1981 World Games. The second World Championships were in 1984, and they have been a biannual event since, with the exception of the COVID-19 pandemic period, which delayed the 2020 event by one year.

Worlds have been held in 14 countries across four continents: North and South America as well as Asia and Europe. The United States has hosted Worlds most often – five times, followed by Mexico, three times; and twice each in Canada, the Dominican Republic, and South Korea.

The 2022 World Championships were held in San Luis Potosí, Mexico, which was the first time Worlds was in Mexico since 2000, when it was also held in San Luis Potosí. The 2022 Worlds introduced Mixed Doubles for the first time, and re-introduced the Team Competition (best of three matches: two singles & one doubles), which was held at Worlds until 2012, after which the team winners were determined by the points earned in the individual competitions.

Also, the 2022 World Championships used a best-of-five games match format with each game played to 11 points, win by 2, with rally scoring, as used in other sports like squash and volleyball. Rally scoring – the winner of every rally scores a point – was introduced at Worlds in 2021. Previously, racquetball games used side-out scoring, where players scored points only when they had won a rally which began with that player serving. Rallies won when not serving were simply side-outs: the rally losing player lost the serve and the rally winning player won the opportunity to serve, but did not win a point.

== Individual event champions ==
| No. | Year | Host | Men's singles | Women's singles | Men's doubles | Women's doubles | Mixed doubles |
|---|---|---|---|---|---|---|---|
| 1 | 1981 | United States | (United States) Ed Andrews | (United States) Cindy Baxter | (United States) Mark Malowitz & Jeff Kwartler | (United States) Mary Ann Cluess & Karen Borga | |
| 2 | 1984 | United States | (Canada) Ross Harvey | (United States) Mary Dee | (United States) Stan Wright & Steve Trent | (United States) Carol French & Malia Kamahoahoa | |
| 3 | 1986 | United States | (United States) Egan Inoue | (United States) Cindy Baxter | (United States) Jack Nolan & Todd O'Neil | (Canada) Carol McFetridge & Marion Sicotte | |
| 4 | 1988 | Germany | (United States) Andy Roberts | (Canada) Heather Stupp | (United States) Doug Ganim & Dan Obremski | (United States) Diane Green & Trina Rasmussen | |
| 5 | 1990 | Venezuela | (United States) Egan Inoue | (Canada) Heather Stupp | (United States) Doug Ganim & Dan Obremski | (United States) Malia Bailey & Jackie Paraiso | |
| 6 | 1992 | Canada | (United States) Chris Cole | (United States) Michelle Gould | (United States) Doug Ganim & Eric Muller | (United States) Malia Bailey & Robin Levine | |
| 7 | 1994 | Mexico | (Canada) Sherman Greenfeld | (United States) Michelle Gould | (United States) John Ellis & Eric Muller | (United States) Laura Fenton & Jackie Paraiso Gibson | |
| 8 | 1996 | United States | (United States) Todd O'Neil | (United States) Michelle Gould | (United States) Adam Karp & Bill Sell | (United States) Joy MacKenzie & Jackie Paraiso | |
| 9 | 1998 | Bolivia | (Canada) Sherman Greenfeld | (Canada) Christie Van Hees | (United States) Adam Karp & Bill Sell | (United States) Joy Mackenzie & Jackie Paraiso | |
| 10 | 2000 | Mexico | (Mexico) Álvaro Beltrán | (United States) Cheryl Gudinas | (Mexico) Luis Bustilos & Javier Moreno | (United States) Kersten Hallander & Kim Russell | |
| 11 | 2002 | Puerto Rico | (United States) Jack Huczek | (United States) Cheryl Gudinas | (Mexico) Polo Gutierrez & Gilberto Mejia | (United States) Jackie Paraiso Rice & Kim Russell | |
| 12 | 2004 | South Korea | (United States) Jack Huczek | (United States) Cheryl Gudinas | (United States) Shane Vanderson & Mike Dennison | (United States) Jackie Paraiso Rice & Kim Russell | |
| 13 | 2006 | Dominican Republic | (United States) Jack Huczek | (Canada) Christie Van Hees | (Mexico) Álvaro Beltrán & Javier Moreno | (United States) Aimee Ruiz & Laura Fenton | |
| 14 | 2008 | Ireland | (United States) Rocky Carson | (United States) Rhonda Rajsich | (United States) Jason Thoerner & Mitch Williams | (United States) Aimee Ruiz & Jackie Paraiso | |
| 15 | 2010 | South Korea | (United States) Rocky Carson | (United States) Rhonda Rajsich | (United States) Ben Croft & Mitch Williams | (Mexico) Paola Longoria & Samantha Salas | |
| 16 | 2012 | Dominican Republic | (United States) Rocky Carson | (Mexico) Paola Longoria | (Mexico) Álvaro Beltrán & Javier Moreno | (Mexico) Paola Longoria & Samantha Salas | |
| 17 | 2014 | Canada | (United States) Rocky Carson | (Mexico) Paola Longoria | (Colombia) Sebastian Franco & Alejandro Herrera | (Mexico) Paola Longoria & Samantha Salas | |
| 18 | 2016 | Colombia | (United States) Rocky Carson | (Mexico) Paola Longoria | (Mexico) Álvaro Beltrán & Javier Moreno | (United States) Aimee Ruiz & Janel Tisinger | |
| 19 | 2018 | Costa Rica | (Mexico) Rodrigo Montoya | (Guatemala) Gabriela Martinez | (Mexico) Álvaro Beltrán & Daniel De La Rosa | (Bolivia) Valeria Centellas & Yasmine Sabja | |
| 20 | 2021 | Guatemala | (United States) Alejandro Landa | (Mexico) Paola Longoria | (Mexico) Javier Mar & Rodrigo Montoya | (Mexico) Paola Longoria & Samantha Salas | |
| 21 | 2022 | Mexico | (Bolivia) Conrrado Moscoso | (Mexico) Paola Longoria | (Mexico) Álvaro Beltrán & Daniel De La Rosa | (Mexico) Paola Longoria & Samantha Salas | (Mexico) Rodrigo Montoya & Samantha Salas |
| 22 | 2024 | United States | (United States) Daniel De La Rosa | (Mexico) Paola Longoria | (Canada) Coby Iwaasa & Samuel Murray | (Mexico) Alexandra Herrera & Montserrat Mejia | (United States) Daniel De La Rosa & Hollie Scott |
| 23 | 2026 | Chile | (Bolivia) Conrrado Moscoso | (Argentina) Maria Jose Vargas | (Mexico) Andree Parrilla & Eduardo Portillo | (Mexico) Alexandra Herrera & Samantha Salas | (Mexico) Rodrigo Montoya & Samantha Salas |

== Multiple world champions ==
| Champion | Singles | Doubles | Mixed | Total |
|---|---|---|---|---|
| (Mexico) Paola Longoria | 6 | 5 | 0 | 11 |
| (Mexico) Samantha Salas | 0 | 6 | 2 | 8 |
| (United States) Jackie Paraiso | 0 | 7 | - | 7 |
| (Mexico) Álvaro Beltrán | 1 | 5 | 0 | 6 |
| (United States) Rocky Carson | 5 | 0 | 0 | 5 |
| (Mexico) Rodrigo Montoya | 1 | 1 | 2 | 4 |
| (Mexico) Javier Moreno | 0 | 4 | - | 4 |
| (United States) Michelle Gould | 3 | 0 | - | 3 |
| (United States) Cheryl Gudinas | 3 | 0 | - | 3 |
| (United States) Jack Huczek | 3 | 0 | - | 3 |
| (Mexico) / (United States) Daniel De La Rosa | 1 | 1 | 1 | 3 |
| (United States) Aimee Ruiz | 0 | 3 | - | 3 |
| (United States) Doug Ganim | 0 | 3 | - | 3 |
| (United States) Kim Russell | 0 | 3 | - | 3 |
| (United States) Joy MacKenzie | 0 | 3 | - | 3 |
| (United States) Malia Bailey | 0 | 3 | - | 3 |
| (Bolivia) Conrrado Moscoso | 2 | 0 | - | 2 |
| (Mexico) Alexandra Herrera | 0 | 2 | - | 2 |
| (Canada) Christie Van Hees | 2 | 0 | - | 2 |
| (Canada) Heather Stupp | 2 | 0 | - | 2 |
| (Canada) Sherman Greenfeld | 2 | 0 | - | 2 |
| (United States) Egan Inoue | 2 | 0 | - | 2 |
| (United States) Rhonda Rajsich | 2 | 0 | 0 | 2 |
| (United States) Cindy Baxter | 2 | 0 | - | 2 |
| (United States) Todd O'Neill | 1 | 1 | - | 2 |
| (United States) Mitch Williams | 0 | 2 | - | 2 |
| (United States) Dan Obremski | 0 | 2 | - | 2 |
| (United States) Eric Muller | 0 | 2 | - | 2 |
| (United States) Adam Karp | 0 | 2 | - | 2 |
| (United States) Bill Sell | 0 | 2 | - | 2 |
| (United States) Laura Fenton | 0 | 2 | - | 2 |

== World champions by country ==
| Country | Men's singles | Women's singles | Men's doubles | Women's doubles | Mixed doubles | Total |
|---|---|---|---|---|---|---|
| United States | 16 | 11 | 12 | 14 | 1 | 54 |
| Mexico | 2 | 6 | 9 | 7 | 2 | 26 |
| Canada | 3 | 4 | 1 | 1 | 0 | 9 |
| Bolivia | 2 | 0 | 0 | 1 | 0 | 3 |
| Argentina | 0 | 1 | 0 | 0 | 0 | 1 |
| Guatemala | 0 | 1 | 0 | 0 | 0 | 1 |
| Colombia | 0 | 0 | 1 | 0 | 0 | 1 |

== Team event champions ==
| # | Year | Host | Men's team | Women's team | Overall / combined |
|---|---|---|---|---|---|
| 1 | 1981 | United States | – | – | (United States) USA |
| 2 | 1984 | United States | USA | USA | (United States) USA |
| 3 | 1986 | United States | Canada | USA | (United States) USA & Canada |
| 4 | 1988 | Germany | Canada | USA | (United States) USA |
| 5 | 1990 | Venezuela | USA | USA | (United States) USA |
| 6 | 1992 | Canada | USA | USA | (United States) USA |
| 7 | 1994 | Mexico | USA | USA | (United States) USA |
| 8 | 1996 | United States | Canada | USA | (United States) USA |
| 9 | 1998 | Bolivia | USA | USA | (United States) USA |
| 10 | 2000 | Mexico | Canada | USA | Canada |
| 11 | 2002 | Puerto Rico | Canada | USA | (United States) USA |
| 12 | 2004 | South Korea | USA | USA | (United States) USA |
| 13 | 2006 | Dominican Republic | USA | USA | (United States) USA |
| 14 | 2008 | Ireland | USA | USA | (United States) USA |
| 15 | 2010 | South Korea | USA | USA | (United States) USA |
| 16 | 2012 | Dominican Republic | USA | Mexico | (United States) USA |
| 17 | 2014 | Canada | USA | Mexico | (United States) USA |
| 18 | 2016 | Colombia | USA | Mexico | Mexico |
| 19 | 2018 | Costa Rica | Mexico | Mexico | Mexico |
| 20 | 2021 | Guatemala | USA | Mexico | (United States) USA |
| 21 | 2022 | Mexico | Mexico | Mexico | Mexico |
| 22 | 2024 | United States | USA | Mexico | Mexico |
| 23 | 2026 | Chile | Canada | Argentina | Mexico |
