= Álvaro Beltrán =

Mexican racquetball player

Personal information
- Born: October 15, 1978 (age 47) Tijuana, Mexico
- Height: 187 cm (6 ft 2 in)
Medal record
Men's Racquetball
Representing Mexico
Event	1st	2nd	3rd
Pan American Games	4	2	3
World Championships	7	1	1
Central American and Caribbean Games	9	1	1
Pan American Championships	5	0	1
Total	25	4	6
Pan American Games
Silver medal – second place	2019 Lima	Singles
Bronze medal – third place	2019 Lima	Team
Silver medal – second place	2015 Toronto	Singles
Gold medal – first place	2015 Toronto	Team
Bronze medal – third place	2011 Guadalajara	Singles
Gold medal – first place	2011 Guadalajara	Doubles
Gold medal – first place	2011 Guadalajara	Team
Gold medal – first place	2003 Santo Domingo	Doubles
Bronze medal – third place	1999 Winnipeg	Doubles
World Championships
Gold medal – first place	2022 San Luis Potosi	Doubles
Gold medal – first place	2022 San Luis Potosi	Team
Gold medal – first place	2018 San José	Doubles
Gold medal – first place	2016 Cali	Doubles
Gold medal – first place	2012 Santo Domingo	Doubles
Bronze medal – third place	2012 Santo Domingo	Team
Gold medal – first place	2006 Santo Domingo	Doubles
Silver medal – second place	2002 Puerto Rico	Singles
Gold medal – first place	2000 St Luis Potosi	Singles
Pan Am Championships
Bronze medal – third place	2019 Barranquilla	Singles
Gold medal – first place	2018 Temuco	Doubles
Gold medal – first place	2015 Santo Domingo	Doubles
Gold medal – first place	2009 Cali	Singles
Gold medal – first place	2008 San Jose	Singles
Gold medal – first place	2007 Santiago	Singles
Central American and Caribbean Games
Gold medal – first place	2018 Barranquilla	Doubles
Gold medal – first place	2018 Barranquilla	Team
Gold medal – first place	2014 Veracruz	Singles
Gold medal – first place	2014 Veracruz	Doubles
Gold medal – first place	2014 Veracruz	Team
Gold medal – first place	2010 Mayagüez	Singles
Gold medal – first place	2010 Mayagüez	Team
Bronze medal – third place	2006 Cartagena	Singles
Gold medal – first place	2006 Cartagena	Team
Silver medal – second place	2002 San Salvador	Singles
Gold medal – first place	2002 San Salvador	Team

Álvaro Beltrán (born October 15, 1978), is a Mexican professional racquetball player. Beltrán is the current International Racquetball Federation (IRF) World Champion in Men's Doubles with Daniel De La Rosa, winning the title in 2022 in San Luis Potosi, Mexico. He was the second man to win both Men's Singles and Men's Doubles at the Racquetball World Championships. His six world titles (1 singles & 5 doubles) tie him for 3rd most in IRF history. Beltran has been a top 10 player on the International Racquetball Tour (IRT) for 18 seasons.

== Professional career ==
Beltrán was the first Mexican to be ranked in the top 10 IRT at season's end in 2000-01, and has been a top 10 IRT player in 18 seasons finishing at #3 (his career high) four times. He won his first IRT event in 2013 when he defeated fellow Mexican Daniel De La Rosa in the final of the Red Swain Shootout. Beltran's second win came in November 2015 at the Galaxy Custom Printing Pro-Am in Atlanta, where he defeated Rocky Carson, in the final, 11-8, 8-11, 11-5, 11-4. Overall, Beltrán has been in 42 IRT finals (8th most) in 230 appearances on tour (3rd most).

Beltrán has been in the finals of the US Open Racquetball Championships twice: once in 2010 and again in 2014. He was the first Mexican to do so. He lost both finals to Kane Waselenchuk, but did win the first game of 2010 final, which was Waselenchuk's first loss of a game in six US Open finals. 2010 final was the first US Open final with two non-American players.

Also of note, Beltrán is one of only two players to beat IRT #1 Waselenchuk in a completed match, since Waselenchk's return to the IRT tour in the fall of 2008. That win occurred at the 2009 California Open when Beltrán defeated Waslenchuk in four games in the semi-finals.

== International career ==
Beltrán was the first player to win World Championships in both Men's Singles and Men's Doubles. Beltrán won Men's Singles at the 2000 Racquetball World Championships hosted by the International Racquetball Federation in San Luis Potosi, Mexico, defeating American Rocky Carson in the final. He has won Men's Doubles thrice, all with Javier Moreno. Most recently, he and Moreno won the 2016 Worlds Championships in Cali, Colombia, where they defeated Americans Jake Bredenbeck and Jose Diaz in the final, 15-12, 15-9. Beltran and Moreno first won Men's Doubles in 2006, defeating Americans Carson and Jack Huczek in the final, and then six years later in 2012, defeating Americans Tony Carson and Jansen Allen. Both those wins were in Santo Domingo, Dominican Republic.

Beltrán and Moreno also won the gold medals in doubles at the 2003 Pan American Games, and 2011 Pan Am Games. In 2003, they beat Americans Ruben Gonzalez and Mike Guidry in the final, and in 2011 final, defeated Venezuelans Cesar Castillo and Jorge Hirsekorn. Beltrán also won gold in the team competition at the 2011 Pan Am Games.

In addition, Beltrán won three consecutive Pan American Championships in Men's Singles from 2007–2009, and the 2015 Pan Am Championship in Men's Doubles with Javier Moreno. He is a two time the gold medalist in Men's Singles at the Central American and Caribbean Games, as he defeated countrymen Gilberto Meija in 2010 final and Daniel De La Rosa in 2014 final, 15-7, 15-2.

In 2018, Beltrán and Rodrigo Montoya captured gold at the Pan American Championships in Temuco, Chile by defeating Bolivians Roland Keller and Conrrado Moscoso in the final, 13-15, 15-10, 11-6.

Beltrán and Daniel De La Rosa won Men's Doubles at the 2018 World Championships in San José, Costa Rica, where they defeated Rocky Carson and Sudsy Monchik in the final, 10-15, 15-9, 11-2, after beating Bolivians Roland Keller and Conrrado Moscoso, 15-14, 15-8, in the semi-finals.

Beltrán and Daniel De La Rosa won Men's Doubles at the 2022 World Championships in San Luis Potosi, Mexico, where they defeated Bolivians Roland Keller and Conrrado Moscoso, coming back from two games down to win 7-11, 12-14, 11-7, 11-5, 11-6, in the final. In the semi-finals, they beat Americans Sam Bredenbeck and Charlie Pratt, 12-10, 11-9, 11-7.

== Career summary ==
Playing for Mexico, Beltrán has won 25 gold medals, doing so in both singles and doubles. His highlights are two gold medals in Men's Doubles at the Pan American Games and six World Championships: one in singles and five in doubles. He's also won 3 times on the IRT, and 3 US Open IRT doubles titles.

=== Career record ===
This table lists Beltrán's results across annual events.

Event	2000	2001	2002	2003	2004	2005	2006	2007	2008	2009	2010	2011	2012	2013	2014	2015	2016	2017	2018	2019	2020	2021	2022	2023
US Open	SF	QF	QF	16	16	QF	QF	QF	QF	-	F	16	SF	SF	F	SF	QF	SF	16	QF	P	16	32	-
US Open Doubles															F	QF	QF	F	W	F	P	W	W	-
IRT Ranking	40	6	6	5	5	6	4	4	3	4	32	11	5	3	3	3	4	4	5	5	5	11	20	45

Note: W = winner, F = finalist, SF = semi-finalist, QF = quarterfinalist, 16 = Round of 16. P = pandemic. There was no US Open in 2023.
