= Honduras at the 2027 Pan American Games =

- IOC code: HON
- NOC: Honduran Olympic Committee

in Lima, Peru 2027 – 2027
- Competitors: 7 in 3 sports
- Medals: Gold 0 Silver 0 Bronze 0 Total 0

Pan American Games appearances (overview)
- 1975; 1979; 1983; 1987; 1991; 1995; 1999; 2003; 2007; 2011; 2015; 2019; 2023

Honduras is scheduled to compete at the 2027 Pan American Games in Lima, Peru from July 23 to August 8, 2027. This will be Honduras's 14th appearance at the Pan American Games, having competed at every edition of the Games since 1975.

== Competitors ==
The following is the list of number of competitors (per gender) participating at the games per sport/discipline.

Sport	Men	Women	Total
Equestrian			4
Gymnastics	0	1	1
Wrestling	2	0	2
Total	2	1	7

== Equestrian ==
Honduras qualified a team of 4 equestrians in Eventing after reaching the podium at the 2026 Central American and Caribbean Games.

=== Eventing ===
Athlete	Horse	Event	Dressage		Cross-country			Jumping			Total	
Athlete	Horse	Event	Result	Rank	Penalties	Total	Rank	Penalties	Total	Rank	Penalties	Rank
		Individual										
		Team			—N/a			—N/a			—N/a	

== Gymnastics ==
=== Artistic ===
Honduras qualified a female gymnast at the 2026 Pan American Artistic Gymnastics Championships.

Athlete	Event	Qualification				Total	Rank
Athlete	Event	V	UB	BB	F	Total	Rank
Lily Guevara	Women's individual all-around						

Qualification Legend: Q = Qualified to apparatus final

== Wrestling ==
Honduras qualified two male wrestlers through the 2026 Pan American Wrestling Championships.

Key:

- VT – Victory by fall.
- PP – Decision by points – the loser with technical points.
- PO – Decision by points – the loser without technical points.
- SP – Technical superiority – the loser with technical points and a margin of victory of at least 9 (Greco-Roman) or 10 (freestyle) points.
- ST – Great superiority – the loser without technical points and a margin of victory of at least 8 (Greco-Roman) or 10 (freestyle) points.
- VA – Decision by withdrawal

Men

Athlete	Event	Round of 16	Quarterfinal	Semifinal	Repechage	Final / BM	
Athlete	Event	Opposition Result	Opposition Result	Opposition Result	Opposition Result	Opposition Result	Rank
	Greco-Roman 77 kg	Bye					
	Greco-Roman 97 kg	Bye					
