= Wrestling at the 2015 Pan American Games =

- Wrestling pictogram for the games
- Venue: Mississauga Sports Centre
- Dates: July 15–18
- No. of events: 18 (12 men, 6 women)
- Competitors: 148 from 22 nations

Wrestling competitions at the 2015 Pan American Games in Toronto were held from July 15 to 18 at the Hershey Centre (Mississauga Sports Centre) in Mississauga. Due to naming rights the arena was known as the latter for the duration of the games. The competition was split into two disciplines, Freestyle and Greco-Roman which were further divided into different weight categories. Men competed in both disciplines whereas women only took part in the freestyle events, with 18 gold medals awarded. Wrestling has been contested at every Pan American Games.

== Competition schedule ==
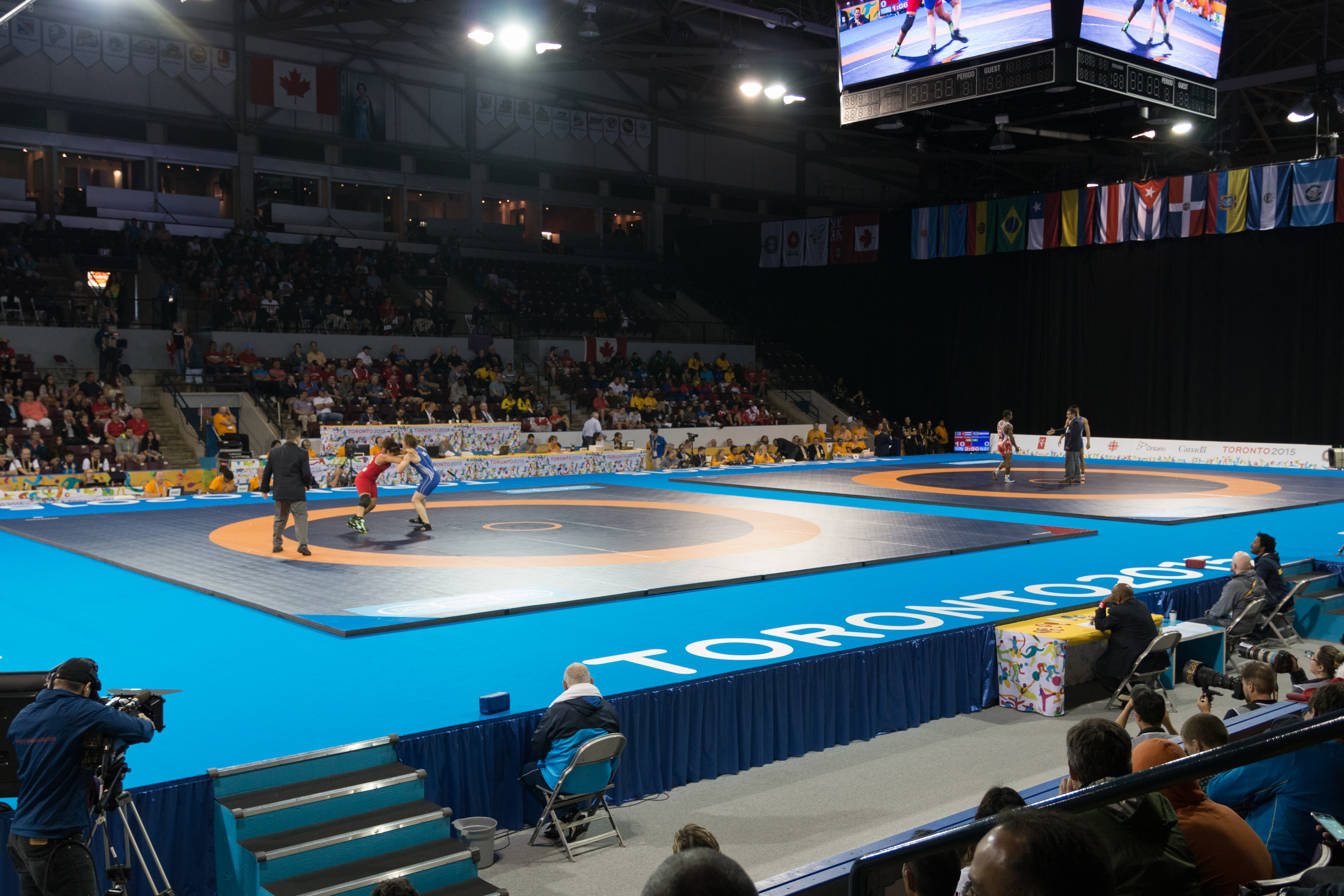
The Hershey Centre (Mississauga Sports Centre), in Mississauga, was the venue for the wrestling competitions (pictured here during the games)

The following is the competition schedule for the wrestling competitions:

Q	Qualifications	¼	Quarterfinals	½	Semifinals	F	Final

Event↓/Date →	Wed 15				Thu 16				Fri 17				Sat 18			
Men's Freestyle 57 kg									1/4		1/2	F				
Men's Freestyle 65 kg									Q	1/4	1/2	F				
Men's Freestyle 74 kg													Q	1/4	1/2	F
Men's Freestyle 86 kg													1/4		1/2	F
Men's Freestyle 97 kg													1/4		1/2	F
Men's Freestyle 125 kg													1/4		1/2	F
Men's Greco-Roman 59 kg	Q	1/4	1/2	F												
Men's Greco-Roman 66 kg	1/4		1/2	F												
Men's Greco-Roman 75 kg	Q	1/4	1/2	F												
Men's Greco-Roman 85 kg	1/4		1/2	F												
Men's Greco-Roman 98 kg					1/4		1/2	F								
Men's Greco-Roman 130 kg					1/4		1/2	F								
Women's Freestyle 48 kg					1/4		1/2	F								
Women's Freestyle 53 kg					Q	1/4	1/2	F								
Women's Freestyle 58 kg					1/4		1/2	F								
Women's Freestyle 63 kg									1/4		1/2	F				
Women's Freestyle 69 kg									1/4		1/2	F				
Women's Freestyle 75 kg									1/4		1/2	F				

== Medal table ==
* Host nation (Canada)

Rank	Nation	Gold	Silver	Bronze	Total
1	United States	8	3	4	15
2	Cuba	4	3	6	13
3	Canada*	3	3	2	8
4	Venezuela	1	2	5	8
5	Ecuador	1	1	1	3
6	Brazil	1	0	2	3
7	Mexico	0	2	3	5
8	Peru	0	1	2	3
9	Chile	0	1	1	2
10	Honduras	0	1	0	1
10	Panama	0	1	0	1
12	Colombia	0	0	5	5
13	Puerto Rico	0	0	3	3
14	Dominican Republic	0	0	1	1
Totals (14 entries)		18	18	35	71

== Medalists ==
=== Men's events ===
Freestyle

Event	Gold	Silver	Bronze
57 kg	Yowlys Bonne; Cuba	Angel Escobedo; United States	Emir Hernandez; Colombia
57 kg	Yowlys Bonne; Cuba	Angel Escobedo; United States	Pedro Mejías; Venezuela
65 kg	Brent Metcalf; United States	Franklin Marén; Cuba	Haislan Garcia; Canada
65 kg	Brent Metcalf; United States	Franklin Marén; Cuba	Franklin Gómez; Puerto Rico
74 kg	Jordan Burroughs; United States	Yoan Blanco; Ecuador	Christian Sarco; Venezuela
74 kg	Jordan Burroughs; United States	Yoan Blanco; Ecuador	Liván López; Cuba
86 kg	Reineris Salas; Cuba	Jake Herbert; United States	Tamerlan Tagziev; Canada
86 kg	Reineris Salas; Cuba	Jake Herbert; United States	Jaime Espinal; Puerto Rico
97 kg	Kyle Snyder; United States	Arjun Gill; Canada	José Daniel Díaz; Venezuela
97 kg	Kyle Snyder; United States	Arjun Gill; Canada	Jesse Ruíz; Mexico
125 kg	Zach Rey; United States	Korey Jarvis; Canada	Edgardo Lopez; Puerto Rico
125 kg	Zach Rey; United States	Korey Jarvis; Canada	Andres Ramos; Cuba

Greco-Roman

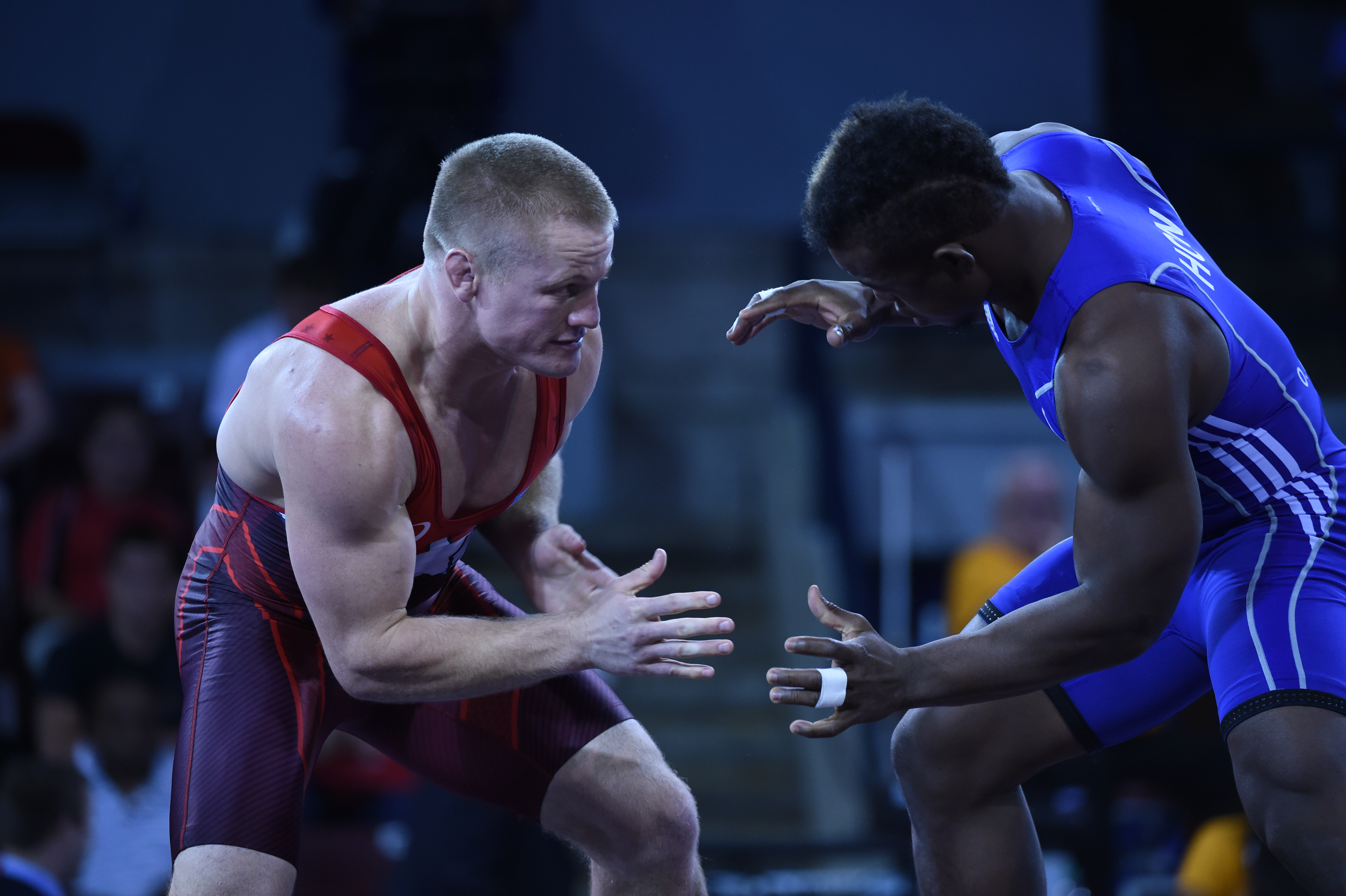
Jon Anderson the gold medalist in the 85 kg event in a preliminary round matchup against a wrestler from Honduras.

Event	Gold	Silver	Bronze
59 kg	Andrés Montaño; Ecuador	Ali Soto; Mexico	Cristóbal Torres; Chile
59 kg	Andrés Montaño; Ecuador	Ali Soto; Mexico	Spenser Mango; United States
66 kg	Wuileixis Rivas; Venezuela	Bryce Saddoris; United States	Miguel Martínez; Cuba
66 kg	Wuileixis Rivas; Venezuela	Bryce Saddoris; United States	Mario Molina; Peru
75 kg	Andy Bisek; United States	Alvis Almendra; Panama	Juan Escobar; Mexico
75 kg	Andy Bisek; United States	Alvis Almendra; Panama	Carlos Muñoz; Colombia
85 kg	Jon Anderson; United States	Querys Perez; Venezuela	Alan Vera; Cuba
85 kg	Jon Anderson; United States	Querys Perez; Venezuela	Cristhian Mosquera; Colombia
98 kg	Yasmany Lugo; Cuba	Kevin Mejía; Honduras	Luillys Pérez; Venezuela
98 kg	Yasmany Lugo; Cuba	Kevin Mejía; Honduras	Davi Albino; Brazil
130 kg	Mijaín López; Cuba	Andrés Ayub; Chile	Josue Encarnación; Dominican Republic
130 kg	Mijaín López; Cuba	Andrés Ayub; Chile	Robby Smith; United States

=== Women's events ===
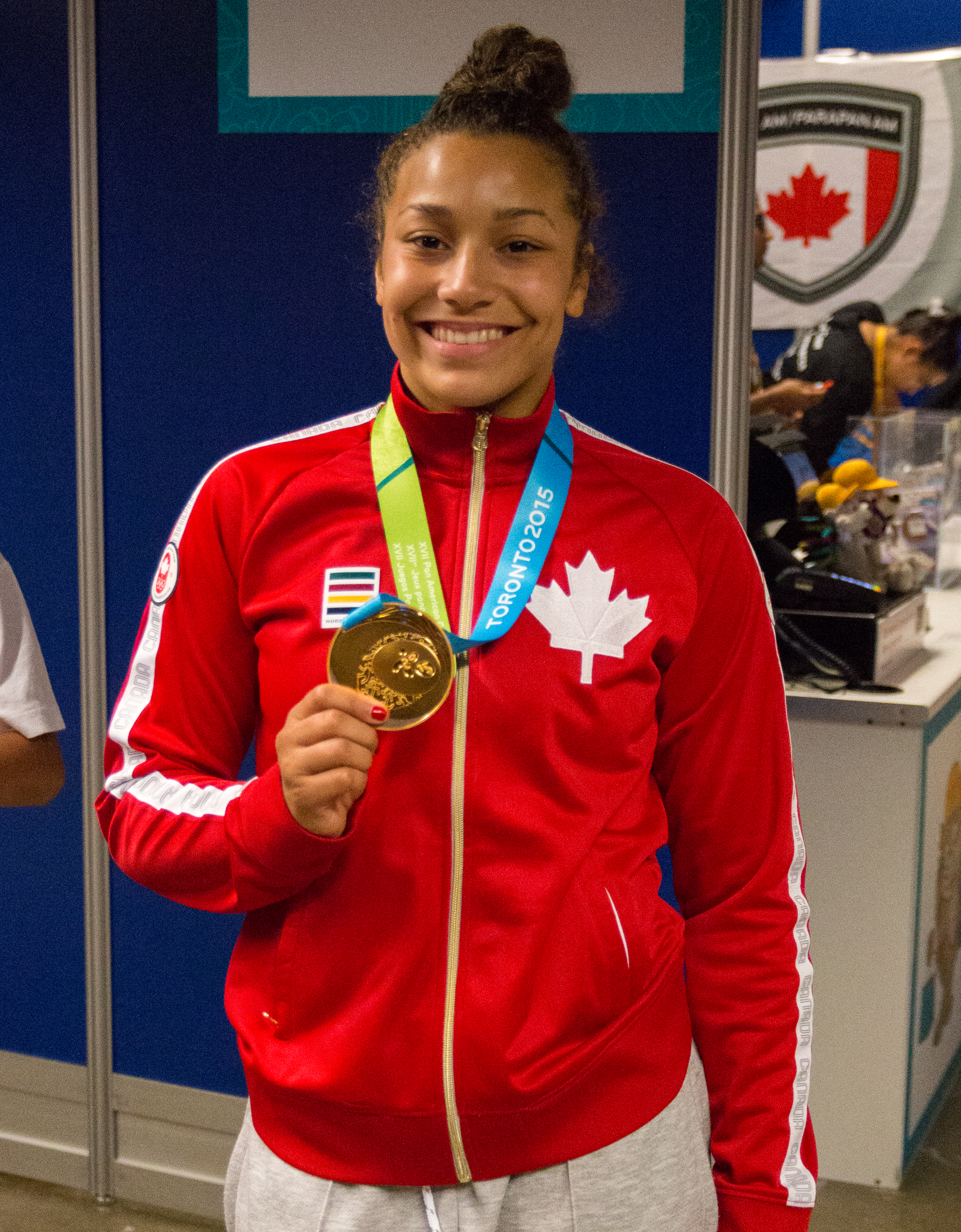
Braxton Stone won gold in the women's 63 kg freestyle event

Freestyle

Event	Gold	Silver	Bronze
48 kg	Geneviève Morrison; Canada	Thalia Mallqui; Peru	Alyssa Lampe; United States
48 kg	Geneviève Morrison; Canada	Thalia Mallqui; Peru	Carolina Castillo; Colombia
53 kg	Whitney Conder; United States	Alma Valencia; Mexico	Yamilka Del Valle; Cuba
53 kg	Whitney Conder; United States	Alma Valencia; Mexico	Betzabeth Argüello; Venezuela
58 kg	Joice Silva; Brazil	Yakelin Estornell; Cuba	Lissette Antes; Ecuador
58 kg	Joice Silva; Brazil	Yakelin Estornell; Cuba	Yanet Sovero; Peru
63 kg	Braxton Stone; Canada	Katerina Vidiaux; Cuba	Jackeline Rentería; Colombia
63 kg	Braxton Stone; Canada	Katerina Vidiaux; Cuba	Erin Clodgo; United States
69 kg	Dorothy Yeats; Canada	María Acosta; Venezuela	Diana Miranda; Mexico
69 kg	Dorothy Yeats; Canada	María Acosta; Venezuela	Vacant
75 kg	Adeline Gray; United States	Justina Di Stasio; Canada	Aline Ferreira; Brazil
75 kg	Adeline Gray; United States	Justina Di Stasio; Canada	Lisset Hechavarría; Cuba

== Participating nations ==
A total of 22 countries had qualified athletes. The number of athletes a nation entered is in parentheses beside the name of the country.

- Argentina (6)
- Bolivia (1)
- Brazil (8)
- Canada (16)
- Chile (3)
- Colombia (14)
- Costa Rica (1)
- Cuba (18)
- Dominican Republic (3)
- Ecuador (8)
- El Salvador (1)
- Guatemala (1)
- Haiti (1)
- Honduras (4)
- Mexico (10)
- Nicaragua (3)
- Panama (2)
- Paraguay (1)
- Peru (7)
- Puerto Rico (7)
- United States (16)
- Venezuela (17)

== Qualification ==
A total of 150 wrestlers could qualify to compete at the games. The winner of each weight category 2014 South American Games, 2014 Pan American Championships and 2014 Central American and Caribbean Games qualified, as well as the top five in the 2015 Pan American Championship. The host country (Canada) was guaranteed a spot in each event, but its athletes had to have competed in both the 2014 and 2015 Pan American Championship. A further six wildcards (four men and two women) were awarded to nations without qualified athletes but who took part in the qualification tournaments.

== See also ==
- Wrestling at the 2016 Summer Olympics
