= Honduras at the 2015 Pan American Games =

- IOC code: HON
- NOC: Comité Olímpico Hondureño
- Website: cohonduras.com

in Toronto, Canada 10–26 July 2015
- Competitors: 19 in 11 sports
- Flag bearer (opening): Kevin Mejía
- Flag bearer (closing): Rolando Palacios
- Medals: Gold 0 Silver 1 Bronze 0 Total 1

Pan American Games appearances (overview)
- 1975; 1979; 1983; 1987; 1991; 1995; 1999; 2003; 2007; 2011; 2015; 2019; 2023; 2027

Honduras competed in the 2015 Pan American Games in Toronto, Ontario, Canada from July 10 to 26, 2015.

On July 3, 2015, wrestler Kevin Mejía, was named as the country's flagbearer during the opening ceremony.

== Competitors ==
The following table lists Honduras' delegation per sport and gender.

Sport	Men	Women	Total
Athletics	1	0	1
Boxing	1	0	1
Equestrian	0	1	1
Gymnastics	0	1	1
Judo	1	0	1
Shooting	0	1	1
Swimming	1	2	3
Taekwondo	1	2	3
Tennis	2	0	2
Weightlifting	1	0	1
Wrestling	4	0	4
Total	12	7	19

== Medalists ==
The following competitors from Honduras won medals at the games. In the by discipline sections below, medalists' names are bolded.

Medal	Name	Sport	Event	Date
Silver	Kevin Mejia	Wrestling	Men's Greco-Roman 98 kg	July 16

**Medals by sport**
**Sport**	1st place, gold medalist(s)	2nd place, silver medalist(s)	3rd place, bronze medalist(s)	**Total**
Wrestling	0	1	0	1
**Total**	**0**	**1**	**0**	**1**

**Medals by day**
**Day**	1st place, gold medalist(s)	2nd place, silver medalist(s)	3rd place, bronze medalist(s)	**Total**
July 16	0	1	0	1
**Total**	**0**	**1**	**0**	**1**

== Athletics ==
Honduras qualified one athlete.

Key

- Note – Ranks given for track events are for the entire round
- DSQ = Disqualified

Men

Athlete	Event	Round 1		Semifinal		Final	
Athlete	Event	Result	Rank	Result	Rank	Result	Rank
Rolando Palacios	100 m	DSQ					
Rolando Palacios	200 m	21.19	25	Did not advance			

== Boxing ==
Honduras qualified one male boxer. The boxer later tested positive for positive for drugs and was withdrawn from the competition.

Men

Athlete	Event	Preliminaries	Quarterfinals	Semifinals	Final
Athlete	Event	Opposition Result	Opposition Result	Opposition Result	Opposition Result
Merin Zalazar	Lightweight (60kg)	Bye	Rosario (COL); **L** WO	Did not advance	

== Equestrian ==
Honduras qualified one athlete in dressage.

Athlete	Horse	Event	Round 1		Round 2		Final			
Athlete	Horse	Event	Score	Rank	Score	Rank	Score	Rank	Total score	Rank
Karen Atala	Weissenfals	Individual	63.316	30	62.000	35	Did not advance			

== Gymnastics ==
Honduras qualified one female gymnast. Kaisa Chirinos did not compete after injuring her thumb during training.

Artistic
Women

Athlete	Event	Qualification						Final					
Athlete	Event	Apparatus				Total	Rank	Apparatus				Total	Rank
Athlete	Event	F	V	UB	BB	Total	Rank	F	V	UB	BB	Total	Rank
Kaisa Chirinos	All-Around	Did not start											

Qualification Legend: Q = Qualified to apparatus final

== Judo ==
Honduras qualified one male judoka.

Men

Athlete	Event	First round	Quarterfinals	Semifinals	Repechage	Final / BM	
Athlete	Event	Opposition Result	Opposition Result	Opposition Result	Opposition Result	Opposition Result	Rank
Ramon Pileta	+100 kg	Martin Rygielski (CAN); **W** 1000–0001	Pedro Pineda (VEN); **L** 0004–1003	—N/a	Joshua Santos (PER); **W** 1001–0001	Alex Garcia (CUB); **L** 0004–1001	5

== Shooting ==
Honduras received one wildcard.

Women

Athlete	Event	Qualification		Final	
Athlete	Event	Points	Rank	Points	Rank
Claudia Fajardo Rodriguez	10 metre air pistol	350	24	Did not advance	

== Swimming ==
Honduras qualified three swimmers.

Key

- Note – Ranks given are for the entire round
- **FB** = Qualified for the B Final
- **DNS** = Did not start

Athlete	Event	Heat		Final	
Athlete	Event	Time	Rank	Time	Rank
Allan Gutierrez	Men's 50 metre freestyle	23.62	11 **FB**	23.61	15
Allan Gutierrez	Men's 100 metre freestyle	52.16	16 **FB**	52.59	=15
Allan Gutierrez	Men's 100 metre butterfly	55.52	16 **FB**	55.21	14
Karen Vilorio	Women's 100 m backstroke	1:04.29	14 **FB**	1:05.06	14
Karen Vilorio	Women's 200 m backstroke	2:18.45	12 **FB**	2:19.42	14
Karen Vilorio	Women's 200 metre individual medley	2:25.87	13 **FB**	2:24.72	14
Karen Vilorio	Women's 400 metre individual medley	5:03.69	11 **FB**	DNS	
Emma Quintanilla	Women's 10 km open water	—N/a		2:27:08.4	18

== Taekwondo ==
Honduras qualified a team of three athletes (one man and two women).

Athlete	Event	First round	Quarterfinals	Semifinals	Repechage	Bronze medal	Final	
Athlete	Event	Opposition Result	Opposition Result	Opposition Result	Opposition Result	Opposition Result	Opposition Result	Rank
Miguel Ferrera	Men's -80kg	Chris Iliesco (CAN); **L** 3–5	Did not advance					
Yosselyn Molina	Women's -67kg	Katherine Alvarado (CRC); **L** 1–5	Did not advance					
Keyla Ávila	Women's +67kg	Nathalie Iliesco (CAN); **L** 0–8	Did not advance					

== Tennis ==
Honduras received one wildcard spot in the men's singles event, the country later received a reallocated men's spot.

Men

Athlete	Event	1st Round	Round of 32	Round of 16	Quarterfinals	Semifinals	Final
Athlete	Event	Opposition Score	Opposition Score	Opposition Score	Opposition Score	Opposition Score	Opposition Score
Alejandro Obando	Singles	Luz (BRA); **L** 1–6, 1–6	Did not advance				
Kenny Turcios	Singles	Saborío (CRC); **L** 3–6, 5–7	Did not advance				
Alejandro Obando; Kenny Turcios	Doubles	—N/a		Banzer / Zeballos (BOL); **L** 1–6, 5–7	Did not advance		

== Weightlifting ==
Honduras qualified one male weightlifter.

Men

Athlete	Event	Snatch		Clean & jerk		Total	Rank
Athlete	Event	Result	Rank	Result	Rank	Total	Rank
Cristopher Pavon	−94 kg	145	10	180	9	325	9

== Wrestling ==
Honduras qualified four male wrestlers.

Men's

Athlete	Event	Quarterfinals	Semifinals / Repechage	Final / BM	Rank
Athlete	Event	Opposition Result	Opposition Result	Opposition Result	Rank
Kevin Bonilla	Freestyle 57 kg	Bonne (CUB); **L** 0–10	Did not advance	Mejias (VEN); **L** 0–7	5
Jefrin Mejia	Greco-Roman 66 kg	Guallpa (ECU); **W** 10–2	Saddoris (USA); **L** 0–8	Molina (PER); **L** 4–9	5
Oscar Martinez	Greco-Roman 85 kg	Anderson (USA); **L** 0–8	Did not advance	Vera (CUB); **L** 0–8	5
**Kevin Mejia**	Greco-Roman 98 kg	Rocha (MEX); **W** 6–0	Perez (VEN); **W** 8–2	Lugo (CUB); **L** 0–4	2nd place, silver medalist(s)

== See also ==
- Honduras at the 2016 Summer Olympics
