= Wrestling at the 2027 Pan American Games – Qualification =

The following is the qualification system for the Wrestling at the 2027 Pan American Games event, along with a list of qualified wrestlers per weight category.

== Qualification system ==
A total of 168 wrestlers will qualify to compete at the games. The winner of each weight category at the 2025 Junior Pan American Games in Asuncion, Paraguay qualified directly, along with the top four at the 2026 Pan American Wrestling Championships and 2027 Pan American Wrestling Championships. The host country (Peru) is guaranteed a spot in each event, but its athletes must compete in both the 2026 and 2027 Pan American Championship. If Peru does not qualify at any of the first two events, it will take the fourth spot available at the 2027 Pan American Championships. A further six wildcards (four men and two women) will be awarded to nations without any qualified athlete but took part in the qualification tournaments.

== Qualification timeline ==
Events	Date	Venue
2025 Junior Pan American Games	August 21–23	(Paraguay) Asuncion
2026 Pan American Wrestling Championships	May 7–10	(United States) Coralville
2027 Pan American Wrestling Championships	29 April – 2 May	(Peru) Lima

== Qualification summary ==
A total of 15 countries qualified wrestlers or received a wildcard spot.

NOC	Men's freestyle						Men's Greco-Roman						Women's freestyle						Total
NOC	57	65	74	86	97	125	60	67	77	87	97	130	50	53	57	62	68	76	Total
Bahamas		X																	1
Brazil						X	X		X			X	X	X	X	X			8
Canada		X	X			X							X	X		X			6
Chile									X								X		2
Colombia				X				X									X		3
Cuba	X		X		X		X	X		X	X	X	X		X			X	11
Dominican Republic				X	X		X			X	X								5
Ecuador							X	X					X	X	X			X	6
Guatemala	X																		1
Honduras									X		X								2
Mexico															X	X		X	3
Peru	X	X	X	X			X	X	X	X	X		X	X	X			X	13
Puerto Rico	X	X		X								X							4
United States	X	XX	XX	XX	XX	XX	X	X	XX	XX	X	XX	X	X	X	X	X	XX	27
Venezuela	X		X		X	X				X	X			X		X	XX		10
Total: 15 NOCs	9	9	9	9	9	9	9	9	9	9	9	9	9	9	9	9	9	9	167

== Men's freestyle events ==
=== 57 kg ===
Competition	Quota(s)	Qualified
2025 Junior Pan American Games	1	Vladimir Frometa (CUB)
2026 Pan American Championships	4	United States; Puerto Rico; Venezuela; Guatemala
2027 Pan American Championships	3	
Host nation	1	Peru
Wildcard	0	—N/a
Total	9	

=== 65 kg ===
Competition	Quota(s)	Qualified
2025 Junior Pan American Games	1	Bowen Bassett (USA)
2026 Pan American Championships	4	United States; Canada; Bahamas; Puerto Rico
2027 Pan American Championships	3	
Host nation	1	Peru
Wildcard	0	—N/a
Total	9	

=== 74 kg ===
Competition	Quota(s)	Qualified
2025 Junior Pan American Games	1	Mitchell Mesenbrink (USA)
2026 Pan American Championships	4	Cuba; United States; Canada; Venezuela
2027 Pan American Championships	3	
Host nation	1	Peru
Wildcard	0	—N/a
Total	9	

=== 86 kg ===
Competition	Quota(s)	Qualified
2025 Junior Pan American Games	1	Rocco Welsh (USA)
2026 Pan American Championships	4	United States; Dominican Republic; Colombia; Puerto Rico
2027 Pan American Championships	3	
Host nation	1	Peru
Wildcard	0	—N/a
Total	9	

=== 97 kg ===
Competition	Quota(s)	Qualified
2025 Junior Pan American Games	1	Thomas Dineen (USA)
2026 Pan American Championships	4	Cuba; United States; Dominican Republic; Venezuela
2027 Pan American Championships	4	
Host nation	0	—N/a
Wildcard	0	—N/a
Total	9	

- Peru did not compete in this category at the 2026 Pan American Championships, and therefore will not receive a host quota.

=== 125 kg ===
Competition	Quota(s)	Qualified
2025 Junior Pan American Games	1	Lucas Stoddard (USA)
2026 Pan American Championships	4	United States; Canada; Venezuela; Brazil
2027 Pan American Championships	4	
Host nation	0	—N/a
Wildcard	0	—N/a
Total	9	

- Peru did not compete in this category at the 2026 Pan American Championships, and therefore will not receive a host quota.

== Men's Greco-Roman events ==
=== 60 kg ===
Competition	Quota(s)	Qualified
2025 Junior Pan American Games	1	Maxwell Black (USA)
2026 Pan American Championships	4	Cuba; Ecuador; Dominican Republic; Brazil
2027 Pan American Championships	3	
Host nation	1	Peru
Wildcard	0	—N/a
Total	9	

=== 67 kg ===
Competition	Quota(s)	Qualified
2025 Junior Pan American Games	1	Jeremy González (ECU)
2026 Pan American Championships	4	Cuba; United States; Colombia; Peru
2027 Pan American Championships	4	
Host nation	—N/a	—N/a
Wildcard	0	—N/a
Total	9	

- Peru qualified at the 2022 Pan American Championships, therefore the host quota wasn't used.

=== 77 kg ===
Competition	Quota(s)	Qualified
2025 Junior Pan American Games	1	Aydin McElhinney (USA)
2026 Pan American Championships	4	United States; Honduras; Brazil; Chile
2027 Pan American Championships	3	
Host nation	1	Peru
Wildcard	0	—N/a
Total	9	

=== 87 kg ===
Competition	Quota(s)	Qualified
2025 Junior Pan American Games	1	Payton Jacobson (USA)
2026 Pan American Championships	4	United States; Cuba; Venezuela; Dominican Republic
2027 Pan American Championships	3	
Host nation	1	Peru
Wildcard	0	—N/a
Total	9	

=== 97 kg ===
Competition	Quota(s)	Qualified
2025 Junior Pan American Games	1	Juan Leonardo Blanco (VEN)
2026 Pan American Championships	4	Cuba; Honduras; United States; Dominican Republic
2027 Pan American Championships	3	
Host nation	1	Peru
Wildcard	0	—N/a
Total	9	

=== 130 kg ===
Competition	Quota(s)	Qualified
2025 Junior Pan American Games	1	Aden Attao (USA)
2026 Pan American Championships	4	United States; Cuba; Brazil; Puerto Rico
2027 Pan American Championships	4	
Host nation	0	—N/a
Wildcard	0	—N/a
Total	9	

- Peru did not compete in this category at the 2026 Pan American Championships, and therefore will not receive a host quota.

== Women's freestyle events ==
=== 50 kg ===
Competition	Quota(s)	Qualified
2025 Junior Pan American Games	1	Greili Carvajal (CUB)
2026 Pan American Championships	4	United States; Ecuador; Canada; Brazil
2027 Pan American Championships	3	
Host nation	1	Peru
Wildcard	0	—N/a
Total	9	

=== 53 kg ===
Competition	Quota(s)	Qualified
2025 Junior Pan American Games	1	Alexa Valenzuela (VEN)
2026 Pan American Championships	4	Ecuador; Canada; United States; Brazil
2027 Pan American Championships	3	
Host nation	1	Peru
Wildcard	0	—N/a
Total	9	

=== 57 kg ===
Competition	Quota(s)	Qualified
2025 Junior Pan American Games	1	Yaynelis Verdecía (CUB)
2026 Pan American Championships	4	United States; Ecuador; Mexico; Brazil
2027 Pan American Championships	3	
Host nation	1	Peru
Wildcard	0	—N/a
Total	9	

=== 62 kg ===
Competition	Quota(s)	Qualified
2025 Junior Pan American Games	1	Astrid Chirinos (VEN)
2026 Pan American Championships	4	United States; Mexico; Brazil; Canada
2027 Pan American Championships	4	
Host nation	0	—N/a
Wildcard	0	—N/a
Total	9	

- Peru did not compete in this category at the 2026 Pan American Championships, and therefore will not receive a host quota.

=== 68 kg ===
Competition	Quota(s)	Qualified
2025 Junior Pan American Games	1	Gilbery Franco (VEN)
2026 Pan American Championships	4	Venezuela; United States; Chile; Colombia
2027 Pan American Championships	4	
Host nation	0	—N/a
Wildcard	0	—N/a
Total	9	

- Peru did not compete in this category at the 2026 Pan American Championships, and therefore will not receive a host quota.

=== 76 kg ===
Competition	Quota(s)	Qualified
2025 Junior Pan American Games	1	Tristan Kelly (USA)
2026 Pan American Championships	4	United States; Ecuador; Mexico; Cuba
2027 Pan American Championships	3	
Host nation	1	Peru
Wildcard	0	—N/a
Total	9	
