= Racquetball at the 2011 Pan American Games – Men's doubles =

Racquetball – Men's doubles at the 2011 Pan American Games
- Venue: Racquetball Complex
- Dates: October 17 - October 22
- Competitors: 18 from 9 nations

Medalists
Gold medal	Álvaro Beltrán; Javier Moreno	Mexico
Silver medal	Cesar Castro; Jorge Hirsekorn	Venezuela
Bronze medal	Christopher Crowther; Shane Vanderson	United States
Bronze medal	Timothy Landeryou; Kristofer Odegard	Canada

The men's doubles competition of the racquetball events at the 2011 Pan American Games were held from October 17–22 at the Racquetball Complex in Guadalajara, Mexico. The defending Pan American Games champion is Alvaro Beltrán and Javier Moreno of Mexico, while the defending Pan American regional champion from 2011 is Javier Moreno and Polo Gutierrez also of Mexico.

== Schedule ==
All times are Central Standard Time (UTC-6).

Date	Time	Round
October 17, 2011	8:00	Groups
October 18, 2011	8:00	Groups
October 19, 2011	8:00	Groups
October 20, 2011	8:00	Quarterfinals
October 21, 2011	8:00	Semifinals
October 22, 2011	10:00	Final

== Round robin ==
The round robin will be used as a qualification round. Groups will be announced at the technical meeting the day before the competition begins.

=== Pool A ===
Player	Pld	W	L	GF	GA	PF	PA	Points
Jose Alvarez / Fernando Rios (ECU)	2	2	0	4	1	64	48	4
Álvaro Beltrán / Javier Moreno (MEX)	2	1	1	3	3	58	54	2
Cesar Castro / Jorge Hirsekorn (VEN)	2	0	2	1	4	38	58	0

=== Pool B ===
Player	Pld	W	L	GF	GA	PF	PA	Points
Felipe Camacho / Teobaldo Fumero (CRC)	3	3	0	6	2	100	89	6
Christopher Crowther / Shane Vanderson (USA)	3	2	1	5	2	94	68	4
Francisco Gomez / Juan Torres (COL)	3	1	2	2	5	67	85	2
Ricardo Monroy / Roland Keller (BOL)	3	0	3	2	6	78	97	0

=== Pool C ===
Player	Pld	W	L	GF	GA	PF	PA	Points
Timothy Landeryou / Kristofer Odegard (CAN)	3	3	0	6	0	90	33	6
Daniel Maggi / Shai Manzuri (ARG)	3	2	1	4	2	75	73	4
Ramón de León / Luis Pérez (DOM)	3	1	2	2	5	68	90	2
Raul Banegas / Selvin Cruz (HON)	3	0	3	1	6	60	97	0

== Playoffs ==
First Round
8	Francisco Gomez (Colombia) Juan Torres (COL)	10	15	11
9	Ramón de León (Dominican Republic) Luis Pérez (DOM)	15	2	6
11	Ricardo Monroy (Bolivia) Roland Keller (BOL)	15	15
6	Jose Alvarez (Ecuador) Fernando Rios (ECU)	14	8
7	Cesar Castro (Venezuela) Jorge Hirsekorn (VEN)	15	15
10	Raul Banegas (Honduras) Selvin Cruz (HON)	10	7

Quarterfinals
1	Álvaro Beltrán (Mexico) Javier Moreno (MEX)	15	15
8	Francisco Gomez (Colombia) Juan Torres (COL)	4	7
5	Christopher Crowther (United States) Shane Vanderson (USA)	15	15
4	Daniel Maggi (Argentina) Shai Manzuri (ARG)	9	6
3	Timothy Landeryou (Canada) Kristofer Odegard (CAN)	3	15	11
11	Ricardo Monroy (Bolivia) Roland Keller (BOL)	15	10	8
7	Cesar Castro (Venezuela) Jorge Hirsekorn (VEN)	9	15	11
2	Felipe Camacho (Costa Rica) Teobaldo Fumero (CRC)	15	11	6

Semifinals
1	Álvaro Beltrán (Mexico) Javier Moreno (MEX)	9	15	11
5	Christopher Crowther (United States) Shane Vanderson (USA)	15	1	4
3	Timothy Landeryou (Canada) Kristofer Odegard (CAN)	14	3	10
7	Cesar Castro (Venezuela) Jorge Hirsekorn (VEN)	15	3	11

Final
1	Álvaro Beltrán (Mexico) Javier Moreno (MEX)	15	15
7	Cesar Castro (Venezuela) Jorge Hirsekorn (VEN)	14	4
