= Wrestling at the 2015 Pan American Games – Qualification =

== Qualification system ==
A total of 150 wrestlers will qualify to compete at the games. The winner of each weight category 2014 South American Games, 2014 Pan American Championships and 2014 Central American and Caribbean Games will qualify for the Games. The top five in the 2015 Pan American Championship also qualify. The host country (Canada) is guaranteed a spot in each event, but its athletes must compete in both the 2014 and 2015 Pan American Championships. A further six invitational slots (four men and two women) will be awarded to nations without any qualified athlete but took part in the qualification tournaments. All countries qualifying an athlete in a tournament in 2014 will be required to compete in the 2015 Pan American Championship, failure to do so will mean the forfeiting of the quota. Any unused quota spots will be reallocated to the next best country not qualified at the 2015 Pan Am Championship.

== Qualification timeline ==
Event	Date	Venue
2014 South American Games	March 8–10	(Chile) Santiago
2014 Pan American Championship	July 15–17	Mexico City
2014 Central American and Caribbean Games	November 24–29	(Mexico) Veracruz
2015 Pan American Championship	April 24–26	(Chile) Santiago

== Qualification summary ==
NOC	Men's freestyle						Men's Greco-Roman						Women's freestyle						Total
NOC	57	65	74	86	97	125	59	66	75	85	98	130	48	53	58	63	69	75	Total
Argentina				X	X	X			X			X					X		6
Bolivia							X												1
Brazil			X			X					X		X	X	X		X	X	8
Canada	X	X	X	X	X	X	X			X	X	X	X	X	X	X	X	X	16
Chile			X				X					X							3
Colombia	X	X			X		X	X	X	X	X		X	X	X	X	X	X	14
Costa Rica			X																1
Cuba	X	X	X	X	X	X	X	X	X	X	X	X	X	X	X	X	X	X	18
Dominican Republic				X			X					X							5
Ecuador	X		X				X	X					X	X	X	X			8
El Salvador		X																	1
Guatemala		X																	1
Haiti									X										1
Honduras	X							X		X	X								4
Mexico					X		X	X	X	X	X			X	X		X	X	10
Nicaragua		X				X								X					3
Panama			X						X										2
Paraguay																X			1
Peru	X			X				X	X				X		X	X			7
Puerto Rico		X		X	X	X				X		X				X	X	X	9
United States	X	X	X	X	X	X	X	X	X	X	X	X	X	X		X		X	16
Venezuela	X	X	X	X	X	X		X	X	X	X	X	X	X	X	X	X	X	17
Total: 22 NOCs	8	9	9	8	8	8	9	8	9	8	8	8	8	9	8	9	8	8	150

== Men's freestyle events ==
=== 57 kg ===
Competition	Vacancies	Qualified
Host nation	1	Canada
2014 South American Games	1	Venezuela
2014 Pan American Championship	1	United States
2014 Central American and Caribbean Games	1	Honduras
2015 Pan American Championship	4	Cuba; Ecuador; Colombia; Peru
Total	8	

=== 65 kg ===
Competition	Vacancies	Qualified
Host nation	1	Canada
2014 South American Games	1	Colombia
2014 Pan American Championship	1	Cuba
2014 Central American and Caribbean Games	1	Puerto Rico
2015 Pan American Championship	4	United States; ~~Peru~~; Venezuela; Guatemala; Nicaragua
Invitational	1	El Salvador
Total	9	

=== 74 kg ===
Competition	Vacancies	Qualified
Host nation	1	Canada
2014 South American Games	1	Ecuador
2014 Pan American Championship	1	United States
2014 Central American and Caribbean Games	1	Cuba
2015 Pan American Championship	4	Chile; Brazil; Panama; Venezuela
Invitational	1	Costa Rica
Total	9	

=== 86 kg ===
Competition	Vacancies	Qualified
Host nation	1	Canada
2014 South American Games	1	Venezuela
2014 Pan American Championship	1	Cuba
2014 Central American and Caribbean Games	1	Puerto Rico
2015 Pan American Championship	4	United States; Peru; Dominican Republic; Argentina
Total	8	

=== 97 kg ===
Competition	Vacancies	Qualified
Host nation	1	Canada
2014 South American Games	1	Colombia
2014 Pan American Championship	1	Cuba
2014 Central American and Caribbean Games	1	Mexico
2015 Pan American Championship	4	United States; ~~Brazil~~; Argentina; ~~Trinidad and Tobago~~; Puerto Rico; Venezuela
Total	8	

=== 125 kg ===
Competition	Vacancies	Qualified
Host nation	1	Canada
2014 South American Games	1	Venezuela
2014 Pan American Championship	1	United States
2014 Central American and Caribbean Games	1	Cuba
2015 Pan American Championship	4	Puerto Rico; Brazil; Argentina; ~~Colombia~~; Nicaragua
Total	8	

== Men's Greco-Roman events ==
=== 59 kg ===
Competition	Vacancies	Qualified
Host nation	1	Canada
2014 South American Games	1	Ecuador
2014 Pan American Championship	1	Cuba
2014 Central American and Caribbean Games	1	Dominican Republic
2015 Pan American Championship	4	United States; Colombia; Chile; Mexico
Invitational	1	Bolivia
Total	9	

=== 66 kg ===
Competition	Vacancies	Qualified
Host nation	~~1~~0	~~Canada~~
2014 South American Games	1	Venezuela
2014 Pan American Championship	1	Cuba
2014 Central American and Caribbean Games	1	Colombia
2015 Pan American Championship	5	Peru; United States; Honduras; Ecuador; Mexico
Total	8	

- Canada did not compete in this weight category at the 2014 Pan American Championship and thus lost its host nation spot.

=== 75 kg ===
Competition	Vacancies	Qualified
Host nation	~~1~~0	~~Canada~~
2014 South American Games	1	Venezuela
2014 Pan American Championship	1	United States
2014 Central American and Caribbean Games	1	Mexico
2015 Pan American Championship	5	Cuba; Colombia; Panama; Argentina; ~~Dominican Republic~~; Peru
Invitational	1	Haiti
Total	9	

- Canada did not compete in this weight category at the 2014 Pan American Championship and thus lost its host nation spot.

=== 85 kg ===
Competition	Vacancies	Qualified
Host nation	1	Canada
2014 South American Games	1	Venezuela
2014 Pan American Championship	1	Cuba
2014 Central American and Caribbean Games	1	Puerto Rico
2015 Pan American Championship	4	United States; Mexico; Colombia; Honduras
Total	8	

=== 98 kg ===
Competition	Vacancies	Qualified
Host nation	1	Canada
2014 South American Games	1	Venezuela
2014 Pan American Championship	1	Cuba
2014 Central American and Caribbean Games	1	Honduras
2015 Pan American Championship	4	Brazil; Mexico; United States; Colombia
Total	8	

=== 130 kg ===
Competition	Vacancies	Qualified
Host nation	~~1~~0	~~Canada~~
2014 South American Games	1	Venezuela
2014 Pan American Championship	1	Cuba
2014 Central American and Caribbean Games	1	Dominican Republic
2015 Pan American Championship	5	United States; Argentina; Canada; Chile; Puerto Rico
Total	8	

- Canada did not compete in this weight category at the 2014 Pan American Championship and thus lost its host nation spot. However, its athlete qualified later at the 2015 Pan American Championship.

== Women's freestyle events ==
=== 48 kg ===
Competition	Vacancies	Qualified
Host nation	1	Canada
2014 South American Games	1	Colombia
2014 Pan American Championship	1	United States
2014 Central American and Caribbean Games	1	Cuba
2015 Pan American Championship	4	Ecuador; Venezuela; Peru; Brazil
Total	8	

=== 53 kg ===
Competition	Vacancies	Qualified
Host nation	1	Canada
2014 South American Games	1	Ecuador
2014 Pan American Championship	1	United States
2014 Central American and Caribbean Games	1	Mexico
2015 Pan American Championship	4	Colombia; Venezuela; Brazil; Cuba
Invitational	1	Nicaragua
Total	9	

=== 58 kg ===
Competition	Vacancies	Qualified
Host nation	1	Canada
2014 South American Games	~~1~~0	—
2014 Pan American Championship	1	Ecuador
2014 Central American and Caribbean Games	1	Mexico
2015 Pan American Championship	5	Brazil; Peru; Cuba; Colombia; Venezuela
Total	8	

- This event was not held at the 2014 South American Games

=== 63 kg ===
Competition	Vacancies	Qualified
Host nation	1	Canada
2014 South American Games	1	Colombia
2014 Pan American Championship	1	Venezuela
2014 Central American and Caribbean Games	1	Cuba
2015 Pan American Championship	4	United States; Ecuador; Peru; Puerto Rico
Invitational	1	Paraguay
Total	9	

=== 69 kg ===
Competition	Vacancies	Qualified
Host nation	1	Canada
2014 South American Games	1	Brazil
2014 Pan American Championship	1	Colombia
2014 Central American and Caribbean Games	1	Mexico
2015 Pan American Championship	4	Cuba; Argentina; Puerto Rico; Venezuela
Total	8	

=== 75 kg ===
Competition	Vacancies	Qualified
Host nation	1	Canada
2014 South American Games	1	Brazil
2014 Pan American Championship	1	Cuba
2014 Central American and Caribbean Games	1	Puerto Rico
2015 Pan American Championship	4	Colombia; Venezuela; United States; Mexico
Total	8	
