= Racquetball at the 2011 Pan American Games – Men's team =

Racquetball – Men's team at the 2011 Pan American Games
- Venue: Racquetball Complex
- Dates: October 23–25

Medalists
Gold medal	Mexico
Silver medal	United States
Bronze medal	Colombia
Bronze medal	Ecuador

The men's team competition of the racquetball events at the 2011 Pan American Games will be held from October 23 to 25 at the Racquetball Complex in Guadalajara, Mexico.

== Draw ==
Round of 16
Costa Rica	0	2	0
Argentina	2	1	2
Honduras	0	0
Bolivia	2	2
Ecuador	2	1	2
Dominican Republic	0	2	1

Quarterfinals
Mexico	2	2
Argentina	0	0
Venezuela	0	0	2
Colombia	2	1	0
United States	2	2
Bolivia	0	0
Ecuador	2	0	2
Canada	0	2	1

Semifinals
Mexico	2	2
Colombia (bronze)	0	0
United States	2	2
Ecuador (bronze)	0	0

Final
Mexico (gold)	0	2	2
United States (silver)	2	0	1

== Results ==
=== Round of 16 ===
23 October; 9:00	Report	Costa Rica	1–2	Argentina	Squash Complex; Referee(s): Cesar Farell (URU)
Score by game:
Teobaldo Fumero	0–2	Daniel Maggi
Felipe Camacho	2–1	Shai Manzuri
Teobaldo Fumero/Felipe Camacho	0–2	Daniel Maggi/Shai Manzuri

23 October; 10:15	Report	Honduras	0–2	Bolivia	Squash Complex; Referee(s): Luis Gonzalez (MEX), Fransisco Trujillo (MEX)
Score by game:
Selvin Cruz	0–2	Ricardo Monroy
Raul Banegas	0–2	Carlos Keller

23 October; 9:00	Report	Ecuador	2–0	Dominican Republic	Squash Complex; Referee(s): Fabian Parrilla (MEX), Jorge Rodriguez (CRC)
Score by game:
Fernando Rios	2–0	Luis Pérez
Jose Ugalde	2–0	Ramón de León

=== Quarterfinals ===
23 October; 14:00	Report	Mexico	2–0	Argentina	Squash Complex; Referee(s): Carlos Ruiz (VEN), Ramona Rodríguez (MEX)
Score by game:
Álvaro Beltrán	2–0	Shai Manzuri
Álvaro Beltrán/Javier Moreno	2–0	Daniel Maggi/Shai Manzuri

23 October; 11:30	Report	Venezuela	1–2	Colombia	Squash Complex; Referee(s): Ernesto Palomino (MEX), Miguel Perea (MEX), Jorge Rodriguez (CRC)
Score by game:
Cesar Castillo	0–2	Alejandro Herrera
Jorge Hirsekorn (retired)	0–1	Juan Herrera
Cesar Castillo/Jorge Hirsekorn	2–0	Francisco Gomez/Juan Torres

23 October; 15:15	Report	United States	2–0	Bolivia	Squash Complex; Referee(s): Enrique Esperanza (MEX), Ricky Mattson (CAN)
Score by game:
Christopher Crowther	2–0	Carlos Keller
Christopher Crowther/Shane Vanderson	2–0	Ricardo Monroy/Roland Keller

23 October; 14:00	Report	Ecuador	2–1	Canada	Squash Complex; Referee(s): Cesar Farell (URU), Miguel Perea (MEX), Enrique Esparza (MEX)
Score by game:
Fernando Rios	2–0	Timothy Landeryou
Jose Ugalde	0–2	Vincent Gagnon
Jose Alvarez/Fernando Rios	2–1	Michael Green/Kristofer Odegard

=== Semifinals ===
24 October; 14:30	Report	Mexico	2–0	Colombia (bronze)	Squash Complex; Referee(s): Ricky Mattson (CAN), Carlos Ruiz (VEN)
Score by game:
Gilberto Mejia	2–0	Alejandro Herrera
Álvaro Beltrán/Javier Moreno	2–0	Francisco Gomez/Juan Torres

24 October; 14:30	Report	United States	2–0	Ecuador (bronze)	Squash Complex; Referee(s): Ricky Mattson (CAN)
Score by game:
Rocky Carson	2–0	Fernando Rios
Christopher Crowther/Shane Vanderson	2–0	Fernando Rios/Jose Alvarez

=== Final ===
25 October; 14:30	Report	(gold) Mexico	2–1	United States (silver)	Squash Complex; Referee(s): Carlos Ruiz (VEN), Adolfo Orellana (CRC), Ricky Mattson (CAN)
Score by game:
Gilberto Mejia	0–2	Rocky Carson
Álvaro Beltrán	2–0	Christopher Crowther
Álvaro Beltrán/Javier Moreno	2–1	Christopher Crowther/Shane Vanderson
