= Racquetball at the 2011 Pan American Games =

- Venue: Racquetball Complex
- Dates: October 17 – October 25
- Competitors: 60 from 12 nations

Racquetball competitions at the 2011 Pan American Games in Guadalajara was held from October 17 to October 25 at the Racquetball Complex. Racquetball returned to the games after being dropped from the 2007 Pan American Games.

== Medal summary ==
=== Medal table ===
Rank	Nation	Gold	Silver	Bronze	Total
1	Mexico	5	1	1	7
2	United States	1	4	2	7
3	Venezuela	0	1	0	1
4	Ecuador	0	0	3	3
5	Bolivia	0	0	2	2
5	Canada	0	0	2	2
7	Chile	0	0	1	1
7	Colombia	0	0	1	1
Totals (8 entries)		6	6	12	24

=== Men's events ===
Event	Gold	Silver	Bronze
Men's singles	Rocky Carson; United States	Gilberto Mejia; Mexico	Vincent Gagnon; Canada
Men's singles	Rocky Carson; United States	Gilberto Mejia; Mexico	Álvaro Beltrán; Mexico
Men's doubles	Mexico; Álvaro Beltrán; Javier Moreno	Venezuela; Cesar Castro; Jorge Hirsekorn	Canada; Timothy Landeryou; Kristofer Odegard
Men's doubles	Mexico; Álvaro Beltrán; Javier Moreno	Venezuela; Cesar Castro; Jorge Hirsekorn	United States; Shane Vanderson; Christopher Crowther
Men's team	Mexico; Álvaro Beltrán; Gilberto Mejia; Javier Moreno	United States; Rocky Carson; Shane Vanderson; Christopher Crowther	Colombia; Cesar Castillo; Jorge Hirsekorn
Men's team	Mexico; Álvaro Beltrán; Gilberto Mejia; Javier Moreno	United States; Rocky Carson; Shane Vanderson; Christopher Crowther	Ecuador; Fernando Rios; Jose Alvarez

=== Women's events ===
Event	Gold	Silver	Bronze
Women's singles	Paola Longoria; Mexico	Rhonda Rajsich; United States	Cheryl Gudinas; United States
Women's singles	Paola Longoria; Mexico	Rhonda Rajsich; United States	María Vargas; Bolivia
Women's doubles	Mexico; Paola Longoria; Samantha Salas	United States; Rhonda Rajsich; Aimee Ruiz	Ecuador; María Córdova; María Muñoz
Women's doubles	Mexico; Paola Longoria; Samantha Salas	United States; Rhonda Rajsich; Aimee Ruiz	Chile; Angela Grisar; Carla Muñoz
Women's team	Mexico; Paola Longoria; Samantha Salas	United States; Cheryl Gudinas; Rhonda Rajsich; Aimee Ruiz	Ecuador; María Muñoz; María Córdova
Women's team	Mexico; Paola Longoria; Samantha Salas	United States; Cheryl Gudinas; Rhonda Rajsich; Aimee Ruiz	Bolivia; Cintia Loma; Jenny Daza

== Schedule ==
All times are Central Daylight Time (UTC-5).

Day	Date	Start	Finish	Event	Phase
Day 4	Monday October 17, 2011	8:00	18:00	Men's singles/doubles, Women's singles/doubles	Qualification
Day 5	Tuesday October 18, 2011	8:00	18:00	Men's singles/doubles, Women's singles/doubles	Qualification
Day 6	Wednesday October 19, 2011	8:00	15:00	Men's singles/doubles, Women's singles/doubles	Round of 16
Day 7	Thursday October 20, 2011	8:00	14:00	Men's singles/doubles, Women's singles/doubles	Quarterfinals
Day 8	Friday October 21, 2011	8:00	13:00	Men's singles/doubles, Women's singles/doubles	Semifinals
Day 9	Saturday October 22, 2011	10:00	14:55	Men's singles/doubles, Women's singles/doubles	Finals
Day 10	Sunday October 23, 2011	9:00	15:00	Men's teams Women's teams	Quarterfinals
Day 11	Monday October 24, 2011	9:00	14:00	Men's teams Women's teams	Semifinals
Day 12	Tuesday October 25, 2011	11:00	13:45	Men's teams Women's teams	Finals

== Qualification ==
There will be a maximum of 60 athletes competing in racquetball (33 males and 27 females). All countries must compete in the 2011 Pan American Racquetball championship to qualify athletes to the games, including Mexico the host nation. After the tournament is completed each nation will be given scores for each event, and the top countries will qualify athletes. Each nation can enter the pairs and teams competition, provided they have qualified at least two athletes.

NOC (Note: NOCs with 2 entered athletes may also enter the team and pairs competition.)	Men	Women	Total athletes
Argentina	2	2	4
Bolivia	3	4	7
Canada	4	4	8
Colombia	4	1	5
Chile		2	2
Costa Rica	2		2
Guatemala		1	1
Dominican Republic	2	2	4
Ecuador	3	2	5
Honduras	2		2
Mexico	4	4	8
United States	4	4	8
Venezuela	3	2	5
Total athletes	33	28	61
Total NOCs	11	11	12
