= Wrestling at the 2023 Pan American Games – Qualification =

The following is the qualification system for the Wrestling at the 2023 Pan American Games event, along with a list of qualified wrestlers per weight category.

== Qualification system ==
A total of 168 wrestlers will qualify to compete at the games. The winner of each weight category at the 2021 Junior Pan American Games in Cali, Colombia qualified directly, along with the top four at the 2022 Pan American Wrestling Championships and 2023 Pan American Wrestling Championships. The host country (Chile) is guaranteed a spot in each event, but its athletes must compete in both the 2022 and 2023 Pan American Championship. If Chile does not qualify at any of the first two events, it will take the fourth spot available at the 2023 Pan American Championships. A further six wildcards (four men and two women) will be awarded to nations without any qualified athlete but took part in the qualification tournaments.

== Qualification timeline ==
Events	Date	Venue
2021 Junior Pan American Games	December 1–4	(Colombia) Cali
2022 Pan American Wrestling Championships	May 5–8	(Mexico) Acapulco
2023 Pan American Wrestling Championships	May 3–6	(Argentina) Buenos Aires

== Qualification summary ==
A total of 24 countries qualified wrestlers or received a wildcard spot.

NOC	Men's freestyle						Men's Greco-Roman						Women's freestyle						Total
NOC	57	65	74	86	97	125	60	67	77	87	97	130	50	53	57	62	68	76	Total
Argentina	X	X			X	X		X			X		X					X	8
Bahamas				X															1
Barbados									X										1
Bolivia		X																	1
Brazil			X	X				X	X	X	X	X	X		X	X			10
Canada	X	X	X	X	X	X							X		X	X	X	X	11
Chile	X	X	X	X	X	X	X	X	X	X		X		X	X	X	X		15
Colombia	X	X		X	X		X	X	X	X						X	X	X	11
Costa Rica					X														1
Cuba	X	X	X	X	X	X	X	X	X	X	X	X	X	X	X	X	X	X	18
Dominican Republic		X			X	X	X	X		X	X	X		X			X	X	11
Ecuador							X	X					X	X	X	X		X	7
El Salvador															X				1
Guatemala	X								X										2
Honduras			X							X	X	X							4
Jamaica						X													1
Mexico			X	X			X	X	X	X		X		X	X	X	X	X	12
Panama											X		X	X					3
Paraguay								X											1
Peru		X					X	X						X			X		5
Puerto Rico	X	X	X	X		X			X		X	X			X				9
United States	X	X	X	X	X	X	X		X	X	X	X	X	X	X	X	X	X	17
Uruguay																		X	1
Venezuela	X		X	X	X	X	X		X	X	X	X	X	X	X	X	X	X	16
Total: 24 NOCs	9	10	9	10	9	9	9	10	10	9	9	9	8	9	10	9	9	10	167

== Men's freestyle events ==
=== 57 kg ===
Competition	Quota(s)	Qualified
2021 Junior Pan American Games	1	Cuba
2022 Pan American Championship	~~4~~ 3	United States; Puerto Rico; Colombia; ~~Canada~~
2023 Pan American Championships	3	Venezuela; Argentina; Guatemala
Host nation	1	Chile
Wildcard	0	—N/a
Total	8	

=== 65 kg ===
Competition	Quota(s)	Qualified
2021 Junior Pan American Games	1	United States
2022 Pan American Championship	~~4~~ 3	Puerto Rico; Argentina; Dominican Republic; ~~Canada~~
2023 Pan American Championships	3	Cuba; Peru; Colombia
Host nation	1	Chile
Wildcard	1	Bolivia
Total	9	

=== 74 kg ===
Competition	Quota(s)	Qualified
2021 Junior Pan American Games	1	United States
2022 Pan American Championship	4	Puerto Rico; Cuba; Brazil; Mexico
2023 Pan American Championships	3	Canada; Venezuela; Honduras
Host nation	1	Chile
Wildcard	0	—N/a
Total	9	

=== 86 kg ===
Competition	Quota(s)	Qualified
2021 Junior Pan American Games	1	United States
2022 Pan American Championship	4	Cuba; Puerto Rico; Colombia; Mexico
2023 Pan American Championships	3	Canada; Venezuela; Brazil
Host nation	1	Chile
Wildcard	1	Bahamas
Total	10	

=== 97 kg ===
Competition	Quota(s)	Qualified
2021 Junior Pan American Games	1	Cuba
2022 Pan American Championship	4	United States; Dominican Republic; Costa Rica; Canada
2023 Pan American Championships	3	Argentina; Colombia; Venezuela
Host nation	1	Chile
Wildcard	0	—N/a
Total	9	

=== 125 kg ===
Competition	Quota(s)	Qualified
2021 Junior Pan American Games	1	United States
2022 Pan American Championship	~~4~~ 3	~~Canada~~; Venezuela; Argentina; Puerto Rico
2023 Pan American Championships	3	Jamaica; Cuba; Dominican Republic
Host nation	1	Chile
Wildcard	0	—N/a
Total	8	

== Men's Greco-Roman events ==
=== 60 kg ===
Competition	Quota(s)	Qualified
2021 Junior Pan American Games	1	Colombia
2022 Pan American Championship	4	United States; Mexico; Peru; Dominican Republic
2023 Pan American Championships	3	Ecuador; Cuba; Venezuela
Host nation	1	Chile
Wildcard	0	—N/a
Total	9	

=== 67 kg ===
Competition	Quota(s)	Qualified
2021 Junior Pan American Games	1	Cuba
2022 Pan American Championship	4	Colombia; Brazil; Dominican Republic; Peru
2023 Pan American Championships	4	Chile; Ecuador; Mexico; Argentina
Host nation	—N/a	—N/a
Wildcard	1	Paraguay
Total	10	

- Chile qualified at the 2023 Pan American Championships, therefore the host quota wasn't used.

=== 77 kg ===
Competition	Quota(s)	Qualified
2021 Junior Pan American Games	1	Cuba
2022 Pan American Championship	4	Guatemala; Brazil; United States; Mexico
2023 Pan American Championships	3	Colombia; Venezuela; Puerto Rico
Host nation	1	Chile
Wildcard	1	Barbados
Total	10	

=== 87 kg ===
Competition	Quota(s)	Qualified
2021 Junior Pan American Games	1	Cuba
2022 Pan American Championship	4	Dominican Republic; Mexico; Colombia; Honduras
2023 Pan American Championships	3	Venezuela; United States; Brazil
Host nation	1	Chile
Wildcard	0	—N/a
Total	9	

=== 97 kg ===
Competition	Quota(s)	Qualified
2021 Junior Pan American Games	1	Brazil
2022 Pan American Championship	4	Honduras; Cuba; Dominican Republic; United States
2023 Pan American Championships	4	Venezuela; Argentina; Panama; Puerto Rico
Host nation	0	—N/a
Wildcard	0	—N/a
Total	9	

- Chile did not compete in this category at the 2023 Pan American Championships, and therefore will not receive a host quota.

=== 130 kg ===
Competition	Quota(s)	Qualified
2021 Junior Pan American Games	1	Cuba
2022 Pan American Championship	4	Brazil; Chile; Dominican Republic; Puerto Rico
2023 Pan American Championships	4	Honduras; Venezuela; United States; Mexico
Host nation	—N/a	—N/a
Wildcard	0	—N/a
Total	9	

- Chile qualified at the 2022 Pan American Championships, therefore all four spots were available at the 2023 Pan American Championships.

== Women's freestyle events ==
=== 50 kg ===
Competition	Quota(s)	Qualified
2021 Junior Pan American Games	1	Ecuador
2022 Pan American Championship	4	United States; Canada; Argentina; Cuba
2023 Pan American Championships	~~4~~ 3	Brazil; Panama; Venezuela
Host nation	0	—N/a
Wildcard	0	—N/a
Total	8	

- Chile did not compete in this category at the 2023 Pan American Championships, and therefore will not receive a host quota.

=== 53 kg ===
Competition	Quota(s)	Qualified
2021 Junior Pan American Games	1	Cuba
2022 Pan American Championship	4	United States; Ecuador; Venezuela; Mexico
2023 Pan American Championships	3	Peru; Panama; Dominican Republic
Host nation	1	Chile
Wildcard	0	—N/a
Total	9	

=== 57 kg ===
Competition	Quota(s)	Qualified
2021 Junior Pan American Games	1	Cuba
2022 Pan American Championship	4	Mexico; Brazil; Canada; United States
2023 Pan American Championships	3	Ecuador; Venezuela; Puerto Rico
Host nation	1	Chile
Wildcard	1	El Salvador
Total	10	

=== 62 kg ===
Competition	Quota(s)	Qualified
2021 Junior Pan American Games	1	Venezuela
2022 Pan American Championship	4	Canada; United States; Brazil; Mexico
2023 Pan American Championships	4	Chile; Colombia; Cuba; Ecuador
Host nation	0	—N/a
Wildcard	0	—N/a
Total	9	

- Chile qualified at the 2023 Pan American Championships, therefore the host quota wasn't used.

=== 68 kg ===
Competition	Quota(s)	Qualified
2021 Junior Pan American Games	1	Colombia
2022 Pan American Championship	4	Venezuela; Cuba; Dominican Republic; Canada
2023 Pan American Championships	3	United States; Mexico; Peru
Host nation	1	Chile
Wildcard	0	—N/a
Total	9	

=== 76 kg ===
Competition	Quota(s)	Qualified
2021 Junior Pan American Games	1	Cuba
2022 Pan American Championship	4	United States; Ecuador; Venezuela; Canada
2023 Pan American Championships	4	Colombia; Dominican Republic; Argentina; Mexico
Host nation	0	—N/a
Wildcard	1	Uruguay
Total	10	

- Chile did not compete in this category at the 2023 Pan American Championships, and therefore will not receive a host quota.
