= Honduras at the 2019 Pan American Games =

- IOC code: HON
- NOC: Honduran Olympic Committee
- Website: cohonduras.com

in Lima, Peru 26 July–11 August, 2019
- Competitors: 44 in 13 sports
- Flag bearer: Pedro Espinosa (opening)
- Medals Ranked 27th: Gold 0 Silver 1 Bronze 1 Total 2

Pan American Games appearances (overview)
- 1975; 1979; 1983; 1987; 1991; 1995; 1999; 2003; 2007; 2011; 2015; 2019; 2023; 2027

Honduras competed in the 2019 Pan American Games in Lima, Peru from July 26 to August 11, 2019.

In July 2019, the Honduran Olympic Committee released a full list of 44 athletes (32 men and 12 women) competing in 14 sports.

During the opening ceremony of the games, equestrian athlete Pedro Espinosa carried the Honduras flag as part of the Parade of Nations.

== Competitors ==
The following is the list of the number and gender of the competitors participating in the games and their sport/discipline.

Sport	Men	Women	Total
Athletics (track and field)	1	0	1
Bodybuilding	1	1	2
Cycling	1	0	1
Equestrian	1	1	2
Football	18	0	18
Judo	0	1	1
Rowing	1	0	1
Shooting	0	2	2
Swimming	3	4	7
Table tennis	1	0	1
Tennis	2	0	2
Taekwondo	1	2	3
Weightlifting	1	0	1
Wrestling	1	1	2
Total	32	12	44

== Medalists ==
The following competitors from Honduras won medals at the games. In the by discipline sections below, medalists' names are bolded.

Medal	Name	Sport	Event	Date
Silver	Honduras national under-23 football team: Alex Güity; Enrique Facussé; Cristopher Meléndez; Elvin Oliva; José Antonio García; Ricky Zapata; Elison Rivas; Denil Maldonado; Carlos Pineda; Kervin Arriaga; Rembrandt Flores; José Pinto; Jorge Álvarez; José Reyes; Kilmar Peña; Aldo Fajardo; Darixon Vuelto; Douglas Martínez	Football	Men's tournament	August 10
Bronze	Kevin Mejía	Wrestling	Men's Greco-Roman 97 kg	August 7

**Medals by sport**
**Sport**	1st place, gold medalist(s)	2nd place, silver medalist(s)	3rd place, bronze medalist(s)	**Total**
Football	0	1	0	1
Wrestling	0	0	1	1
**Total**	**0**	**1**	**1**	**2**

== Athletics (track and field) ==
Honduras entered one male athlete.

Key

- Note–Ranks given for track events are for the entire round

Men
Field event

Athlete	Event	Final	
Athlete	Event	Distance	Position
Zachary Short	Shot put	18.62	10

== Bodybuilding ==
Honduras qualified a full team of two bodybuilders (one male and one female).

Athlete	Event	Prejudging		Final	
Athlete	Event	Points	Rank	Points	Rank
Jose Garcia Rodriguez	Men's classic bodybuilding	—N/a		did not advance	
Sandra Alvarado	Women's bikini fitness	—N/a		39	4

- No results were provided for the prejudging round, with only the top six advancing.

== Cycling ==
Honduras qualified one male cyclist.

=== Road ===
Men

Athlete	Event	Final	
Athlete	Event	Time	Rank
Luis Enrique Lopez	Road race	4:09:03	21
Luis Enrique Lopez	Time trial	49:42.18	15

=== Mountain biking ===
Men

Athlete	Event	Final	
Athlete	Event	Time	Rank
Luis Enrique Lopez	Cross-country	1:33:08	11

== Equestrian ==
Honduras qualified two equestrians.

=== Dressage ===
Athlete	Horse	Event	Qualification						Grand Prix Freestyle / Intermediate I Freestyle	
Athlete	Horse	Event	Grand Prix / Prix St. Georges		Grand Prix Special / Intermediate I		Total		Grand Prix Freestyle / Intermediate I Freestyle	
Athlete	Horse	Event	Score	Rank	Score	Rank	Score	Rank	Score	Rank
Karen Atala	D'Esprit Joli	Individual	59.324	35	59.000	33	118.324	33	did not advance	

=== Eventing ===
Athlete	Horse	Event	Dressage		Cross-country		Jumping		Total	
Athlete	Horse	Event	Points	Rank	Points	Rank	Points	Rank	Points	Rank
Pedro Espinosa	Hipolita	Individual	33.00	14	34.80	17	4.00	11	71.80	15

== Football ==
=== Men's tournament ===
Honduras qualified a men's team of 18 athletes.

Roster

The 18-man squad was announced on 22 July 2019.

No.	Pos.	Player	Date of birth (age)	Caps	Goals	Club
	GK	Alex Güity	20 July 1997 (aged 22)	0	0	(National Autonomous Federation of Football of Honduras) Olimpia
	GK	Enrique Facussé	30 December 1998 (aged 20)	0	0	(United States Soccer Federation) Kentucky Wildcats
	DF	Cristopher Meléndez	25 November 1997 (aged 21)	0	0	(National Autonomous Federation of Football of Honduras) Motagua
	DF	Elvin Oliva	24 October 1997 (aged 21)	0	0	(National Autonomous Federation of Football of Honduras) Olimpia
	DF	José Antonio García	21 September 1998 (aged 20)	0	0	(National Autonomous Federation of Football of Honduras) Olimpia
	DF	Ricky Zapata	23 November 1997 (aged 21)	0	0	(National Autonomous Federation of Football of Honduras) Real Sociedad
	DF	Elison Rivas	20 November 1999 (aged 19)	0	0	(National Autonomous Federation of Football of Honduras) Real España
	DF	Denil Maldonado	26 May 1998 (aged 21)	0	0	(National Autonomous Federation of Football of Honduras) Motagua
	MF	Carlos Pineda	23 September 1997 (aged 21)	0	0	(National Autonomous Federation of Football of Honduras) Olimpia
	MF	Kervin Arriaga	5 January 1998 (aged 21)	0	0	(National Autonomous Federation of Football of Honduras) Platense
	MF	Rembrandt Flores	12 May 1997 (aged 22)	0	0	(National Autonomous Federation of Football of Honduras) Olimpia
	MF	José Pinto	27 September 1997 (aged 21)	0	0	(National Autonomous Federation of Football of Honduras) Olimpia
	MF	Jorge Álvarez	28 January 1998 (aged 21)	0	0	(National Autonomous Federation of Football of Honduras) Olimpia
	MF	José Reyes	5 November 1997 (aged 21)	0	0	(National Autonomous Federation of Football of Honduras) Olimpia
	FW	Kilmar Peña	9 March 1997 (aged 22)	0	0	(National Autonomous Federation of Football of Honduras) Lobos UPNFM
	FW	Aldo Fajardo	13 November 1997 (aged 21)	0	0	(National Autonomous Federation of Football of Honduras) Platense
	FW	Darixon Vuelto	15 January 1998 (aged 21)	0	0	(National Autonomous Federation of Football of Honduras) Real España
	FW	Douglas Martínez	5 June 1997 (aged 22)	0	0	(United States Soccer Federation) Real Monarchs

Group B

Pos	Team	Pld	W	D	L	GF	GA	GD	Pts	Qualification
1	Uruguay	3	3	0	0	7	0	+7	**9**	Knockout stage
2	Honduras	3	1	1	1	5	6	−1	**4**	Knockout stage
3	Jamaica	3	1	0	2	3	5	−2	**3**	Fifth place match
4	Peru (H)	3	0	1	2	2	6	−4	**1**	Seventh place match

Source: Lima 2019
Rules for classification: Tie-breakers
(H) Hosts
29 July 2019
17:30

Jamaica	1–3	Honduras
Beckford 46'	Report	Vuelto 71', 80'; Martínez 78'

Estadio Universidad San Marcos
Referee: Fernando Echenique (Argentina)

1 August 2019
20:30

Honduras	2–2	Peru
Vuelto 90+2'; Maldonado 90+7'	Report	Quevedo 15'; Guivin 62'

Estadio Universidad San Marcos
Referee: Felipe González (Chile)

4 August 2019
17:30

Uruguay	3–0	Honduras
Arriaga 34' (o.g.); Ramírez 75' (pen.); Fernández 84'	Report

Estadio Universidad San Marcos
Referee: Gustavo Murillo (Colombia)

Semifinals

7 August 2019
17:30

Mexico	1–1 (a.e.t.)	Honduras
Venegas 40'	Report	Reyes 79'
Penalties
Govea (penalty missed); Vásquez (penalty scored); López (penalty missed); Macías (penalty scored)	2–4	(penalty scored) Martínez; (penalty scored) Vuelto; (penalty scored) Reyes; (penalty scored) Maldonado

Estadio Universidad San Marcos
Referee: Ulises Mereles (Paraguay)

Gold medal match

10 August 2019
20:30

(silver) Honduras	1–4	Argentina (gold)
Martínez 42'	Report	Urzi 7'; Valenzuela 58'; Necul 61'; Vera 65'

Estadio Universidad San Marcos
Referee: Gustavo Murillo (Colombia)

== Judo ==
Honduras qualified one female judoka.

Women

Athlete	Event	Preliminaries	Quarterfinals	Semifinals	Repechage	Final / BM	
Athlete	Event	Opposition Result	Opposition Result	Opposition Result	Opposition Result	Opposition Result	Rank
Cergia David	63 kg	De Lucía (ARG); **L** 00S3–100	did not advance				

== Rowing ==
Honduras qualified one male rower.

Men

Athlete	Event	Heats		Repechage		Semifinals		Final	
Athlete	Event	Time	Rank	Time	Rank	Time	Rank	Time	Rank
Franklin Acosta	Single sculls	7:58.25	5 **R**	8:03.59	4 **FC**	did not qualify		Not held	13

Qualification Legend: FC=Final C R=Repechage
- Results given are within the heat.
- Final C was not held, and Acosta finished 13th overall.

== Shooting ==
Honduras qualified two female sport shooters.

Women

Athlete	Event	Qualification		Final	
Athlete	Event	Points	Rank	Points	Rank
Sthephany Gallo	10 m air pistol	528	27	did not advance	
Sthephany Gallo	25 m pistol	522	24	did not advance	
Pamela Ramirez	10 m air pistol	520	29	did not advance	
Pamela Ramirez	25 m pistol	431	27	did not advance	

== Swimming ==
Honduras qualified seven swimmers (three men and four women).

Key

- Note – Ranks given are for the entire round
- **NR** – National record
- **QB** – Qualified for Final B

Men

Athlete	Event	Heat		Final	
Athlete	Event	Time	Rank	Time	Rank
Marco Flores	50 m freestyle	23.55	21	did not advance	
Marco Flores	100 m freestyle	52.21	22	did not advance	
Julio Horrego	100 m breaststroke	1:02.94 **NR**	15 **QB**	1:02.37 **NR**	12
Julio Horrego	200 m breaststroke	2:18.21	13 **QB**	2:17.90	12
Julio Horrego	200 m individual medley	2:07.78	18	did not advance	
Carlos Vasquez Moreno	100 m butterfly	56.01	17	did not advance	
Carlos Vasquez Moreno	200 m butterfly	2:03.37	16 **QB**	2:02.74	14

Women

Athlete	Event	Heat		Final	
Athlete	Event	Time	Rank	Time	Rank
Julimar Avila	50 m freestyle	26.69 **NR**	13 **QB**	26.91	15
Julimar Avila	100 m freestyle	58.15	14 **QB**	57.74 **NR**	12
Julimar Avila	100 m butterfly	1:03.35	17	did not advance	
Julimar Avila	200 m individual medley	2:25.12	14 **QB**	2:22.43 **NR**	12
Sara Pastrana	200 m freestyle	2:06.65	13 **QB**	2:06.40	12
Sara Pastrana	400 m freestyle	4:28.68	14 **QB**	4:27.11	13
Jennifer Ramirez Posada	800 m freestyle	—N/a		9:39.09	13
Jennifer Ramirez Posada	200 m butterfly	2:24.83	14 **QB**	2:24.50	14
Ana Pastrana Lizano	400 m individual medley	5:16.93	11 **QB**	Disqualified	

== Table tennis ==
Honduras qualified one male table tennis athlete. José You qualified at the individual qualification tournament by winning his side of the bracket of the first draw. You lived in trained in Taiwan for the last 20 years.

Men

Athlete	Event	Round of 32	Round of 16	Quarterfinals	Semifinals	Final	Rank
Athlete	Event	Opposition Result	Opposition Result	Opposition Result	Opposition Result	Opposition Result	Rank
José You	Singles	Jha (USA); **L** 0–4	did not advance				

== Taekwondo ==
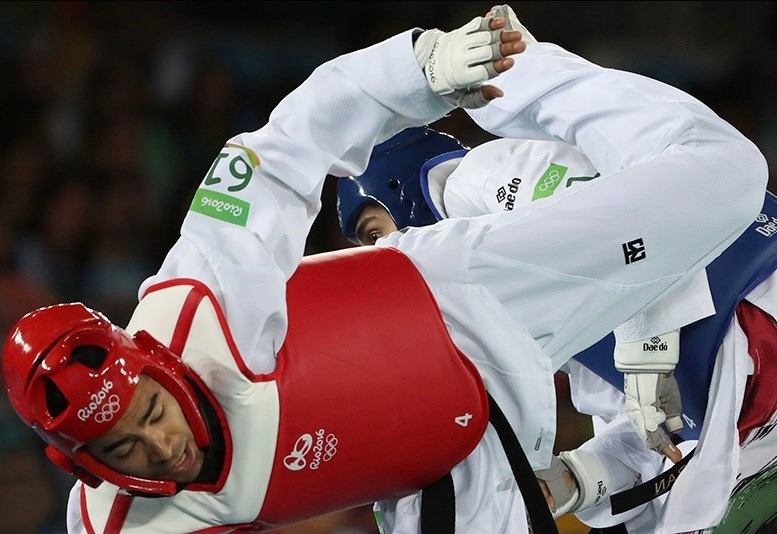
Miguel Ferrera, picture here at the 2016 Summer Olympics, competed in the 80 kg taekwondo event

Honduras qualified three taekwondo practitioners (one man and two women).

Kyorugi

Athlete	Event	Round of 16	Quarterfinals	Semifinals	Repechage	Final / BM	Rank
Athlete	Event	Opposition Result	Opposition Result	Opposition Result	Opposition Result	Opposition Result	Rank
Miguel Ferrera	Men's 80 kg	Iliesco (CAN); **W** 8–8	Hernández (DOM); **L** 7–15	did not advance			
Yosselyn Molina	Women's 67 kg	Kraayeveld (CAN); **L** 4–16	did not advance				
Keyla Ávila	Women's +67 kg	Fernandez (VEN); **L** 0–1	did not advance				

== Tennis ==
Honduras qualified two male tennis players.

Men

Athlete	Event	First round	Round of 32	Round of 16	Quarterfinals	Semifinals	Final / BM
Athlete	Event	Opposition Score	Opposition Score	Opposition Score	Opposition Score	Opposition Score	Rank
Alejandro Obando	Singles	Granja (CUB); **L** 4–6, 1–6	did not advance				
Keny Turcios	Singles	Zeballos (BOL); **L** 3–6, 6–4, 1–6	did not advance				
Alejandro Obando; Keny Turcios	Doubles	—N/a	Bye	González / Mejía (COL); **L** 4–6, 2–6	did not advance		

== Weightlifting ==
Honduras received a wild card for a male weightlifter.

Men

Athlete	Event	Snatch		Clean & Jerk		Total	Rank
Athlete	Event	Result	Rank	Result	Rank	Total	Rank
Jorge Hernández	73 kg	125	7	165	7	290	7

== Wrestling ==
Honduras qualified two wrestlers (one man and one woman).

Athlete	Event	Quarterfinals	Semifinals	Repechage	Final / BM	Rank
Athlete	Event	Opposition Result	Opposition Result	Opposition Result	Opposition Result	Rank
**Kevin Mejía**	Men's Greco-Roman 97 kg	Loango (COL); **W** 7–0	Hancock (USA); **L** 0–10	—N/a	Barreiro (CAN); **W** 8–0	3rd place, bronze medalist(s)
Saidy Chávez	Women's freestyle 68 kg	Garnica (MEX); **L** 0–2^{F}	did not advance			
