= Honduras at the 1999 Pan American Games =

- IOC code: HON
- NOC: Comité Olímpico Hondureño
- Website: cohonduras.com

in Winnipeg 23 July – 8 August 1999
- Medals Ranked 23rd: Gold 0 Silver 1 Bronze 0 Total 1

Pan American Games appearances (overview)
- 1975; 1979; 1983; 1987; 1991; 1995; 1999; 2003; 2007; 2011; 2015; 2019; 2023; 2027

The 13th Pan American Games were held in Winnipeg, Manitoba, Canada from July 23 to August 8, 1999.

== Medals ==
=== Silver ===
===== Football =====
- Men's Team Competition: Honduras national football team

== See also ==
- Honduras at the 2000 Summer Olympics
