= Honduras at the 1995 Pan American Games =

- IOC code: HON
- NOC: Comité Olímpico Hondureño
- Website: cohonduras.com

in Mar del Plata 11–26 March 1995
- Medals Ranked 27th: Gold 0 Silver 0 Bronze 2 Total 2

Pan American Games appearances (overview)
- 1975; 1979; 1983; 1987; 1991; 1995; 1999; 2003; 2007; 2011; 2015; 2019; 2023; 2027

The 12th Pan American Games were held in Mar del Plata, Argentina from March 11 to March 25, 1995.

== Medals ==
=== Bronze ===
===== Boxing =====
- Men's Light Flyweight (– 48 kg): Geovany Baca

===== Judo =====
- Women's Flyweight (– 45 kg): Dora Maldonado

== See also ==
- Honduras at the 1996 Summer Olympics
