= Swimming at the 2015 Pan American Games – Women's 400 metre individual medley =

Women's 400 metre individual medley at the 2015 Pan American Games
- Venue: CIBC Pan Am/Parapan Am Aquatics Centre and Field House
- Dates: July 16 (preliminaries and finals)
- Competitors: 13 from 8 nations
- Winning time: 4:35.46

Medalists
Gold medal	Caitlin Leverenz	United States
Silver medal	Sydney Pickrem	Canada
Bronze medal	Joanna Maranhão	Brazil

The women's 400 metre individual medley competition of the swimming events at the 2015 Pan American Games took place on July 16 at the CIBC Pan Am/Parapan Am Aquatics Centre and Field House in Toronto, Canada. The defending Pan American Games champion was Julia Smit of the United States.

This race consisted of eight lengths of the pool. The first two lengths were swum using the butterfly stroke, the second pair with the backstroke, the third pair of lengths in breaststroke, and the final two were freestyle. The top eight swimmers from the heats would qualify for the A final (where the medals would be awarded), while the next best eight swimmers would qualify for the B final.

== Records ==
Prior to this competition, the existing world and Pan American Games records were as follows:

World record	Ye Shiwen (CHN)	4:28.43	London, United Kingdom	July 28, 2012
Pan American Games record	Joanne Malar (CAN)	4:38.46	Winnipeg, Canada	August 2, 1999

The following new records were set during this competition.

Date	Event	Name	Nationality	Time	Record
16 July	Heat 1	Caitlin Leverenz	United States	4:37.74	GR
16 July	A Final	Caitlin Leverenz	United States	4:35.46	GR

== Qualification ==
Each National Olympic Committee (NOC) was able to enter up to two entrants providing they had met the A standard (4:59.99) in the qualifying period (January 1, 2014 to May 1, 2015). NOCs were also permitted to enter one athlete providing they had met the B standard (5:17.99) in the same qualifying period. All other competing athletes were entered as universality spots.

== Schedule ==
All times are Eastern Time Zone (UTC-4).

Date	Time	Round
July 16, 2015	10:05	Heats
July 16, 2015	19:12	Final B
July 16, 2015	19:22	Final A

== Results ==
KEY:	q	Fastest non-qualifiers	Q	Qualified	GR	Games record	NR	National record	PB	Personal best	SB	Seasonal best

=== Heats ===
The first round was held on July 16.

Rank	Heat	Lane	Name	Nationality	Time	Notes
1	1	4	Caitlin Leverenz	United States	4:37.74	QA, GR
2	2	4	Emily Overholt	Canada	4:39.84	QA
3	2	5	Sydney Pickrem	Canada	4:40.77	QA
4	2	3	Katherine Mills	United States	4:41.05	QA
5	1	5	Joanna Maranhão	Brazil	4:45.28	QA
6	1	3	Virginia Bardach	Argentina	4:48.96	QA
7	1	6	Natalia Jaspeado	Mexico	4:51.69	QA
8	1	2	Moniika Hermosillo-González	Mexico	4:52.24	QA
9	2	6	Florencia Perotti	Argentina	4:52.60	QB
10	2	2	Gabrielle Roncatto	Brazil	4:55.65	QB
11	1	7	Karen Vilorio	Honduras	5:03.69	QB
12	2	7	Andrea Cedrón	Peru	5:07.00	QB
13	2	1	Maria Far	Panama	5:10.85	QB

=== B Final ===
The B final was also held on July 16.

Rank	Lane	Name	Nationality	Time	Notes
9	4	Florencia Perotti	Argentina	4:50.52	
10	5	Gabrielle Roncatto	Brazil	4:53.49	
11	6	Andrea Cedrón	Peru	5:05.81	
12	2	Maria Far	Panama	5:06.36	
	3	Karen Vilorio	Honduras	DNS	

=== A Final ===
The A final was also held on July 16.

Rank	Lane	Name	Nationality	Time	Notes
1st place, gold medalist(s)	4	Caitlin Leverenz	United States	4:35.46	GR
2nd place, silver medalist(s)	3	Sydney Pickrem	Canada	4:38.03	
3rd place, bronze medalist(s)	2	Joanna Maranhão	Brazil	4:38.07	NR
4	6	Katherine Mills	United States	4:41.19	
5	7	Virginia Bardach	Argentina	4:44.85	
6	1	Natalia Jaspeado	Mexico	4:49.89	
7	8	Moniika Hermosillo-González	Mexico	4:53.83	
	5	Emily Overholt	Canada	DSQ	
