= 2004 Racquetball World Championships =

- XII Racquetball World Championships: South Korea 2004 -
Host	Anyang; South Korea
Dates	July 30 – August 7
- Men teams
Champions	United States
Runners-up	Canada
Third place	Mexico
Fourth place	Venezuela
- Women teams
Champions	United States
Runners-up	Canada
Third place	Chile
Fourth place	Mexico
- Men's singles
Gold	(United States) Jack Huczek
Silver	(Mexico) Álvaro Beltrán
Bronze	(United States) Rocky Carson (Canada) Brian Istace
- Women's singles
Gold	(United States) Cheryl Gudinas
Silver	(Chile) Angela Grisar
Bronze	(Canada) Amanda Dunn (Mexico) Nancy Enriquez
- Men's doubles
Gold	(United States) Mike Dennison & Shane Vanderson
Silver	(Mexico) Polo Gutierrez & Javier Moreno
Bronze	(Argentina) Daniel Maggi & Shai Manzuri (Canada) Mike Green & Tom O'Brien
- Women's doubles
Gold	(United States) Jackie Paraiso & Kim Russell
Silver	(Mexico) Susana Acosta & Rosy Torres
Bronze	(Bolivia) P. Nunez & C. Santos (Canada) Josée Grand'Maître & Lori-Jane Powell

The 12th Racquetball World Championships were held in Anyang (South Korea) from July 30 to August 7, 2004, with players from 17 different countries. The USA swept the gold medals, winning both singles and doubles in the men's and women's competitions, as well as both men's and women's team competitions.

Jack Huczek of the USA won men's singles for the second time, successfully defending the title he had won in 2002. Cheryl Gudinas of the USA won her third straight women's singles title.

In doubles, the USA's Jackie Paraiso and Kim Russell successfully defended their women's doubles title. The win was the third consecutive for Russell, who had won with Kersten Hallander in 2000. Paraiso's win was her sixth women's doubles World Championship. Their teammates, Mike Dennison and Shane Vanderson, both won for the first time in men's doubles.

== Medal table ==
Rank	Nation	Gold	Silver	Bronze	Total
1	United States (USA)	6	0	1	7
2	Mexico (MEX)	0	3	2	5
3	Canada (CAN)	0	2	4	6
4	Chile (CHL)	0	1	1	2
5	Argentina (ARG)	0	0	1	1
5	Bolivia (BOL)	0	0	1	1
Totals (6 entries)		6	6	10	22

== Men's team competition ==
Round of 32
(Tonga) TONGA
(Dominican Republic) DOMINICAN REPUBLIC

Round of 16
(Canada) CANADA
(Dominican Republic) DOMINICAN REPUBLIC
(Chile) CHILE
(Guatemala) GUATEMALA
(Venezuela) VENEZUELA
(South Korea) SOUTH KOREA
(India) INDIA
(Japan) JAPAN
(Mexico) MEXICO
(Netherlands) NETHERLANDS
(Puerto Rico) PUERTO RICO
(Bolivia) BOLIVIA
(Argentina) ARGENTINA
(Germany) GERMANY
(Ecuador) ECUADOR
(United States) USA

Quarterfinals
(Canada) CANADA
(Chile) CHILE
(Venezuela) VENEZUELA
(India) INDIA
(Mexico) MEXICO
(Bolivia) BOLIVIA
(Argentina) ARGENTINA
USA

Semifinals
(Canada) CANADA
(Venezuela) VENEZUELA
(Mexico) MEXICO
USA

Final
(Canada) CANADA
USA

Winners
United States

== Women's team competition ==
Round of 16
(Venezuela) VENEZUELA
(South Korea) SOUTH KOREA
(Japan) JAPAN
(India) INDIA
(Dominican Republic) DOMINICAN REPUBLIC
(Chile) CHILE
(Mexico) MEXICO
(Ecuador) ECUADOR
(Guatemala) GUATEMALA
(Bolivia) BOLIVIA
(Puerto Rico) PUERTO RICO
(Vietnam) VIET NAM

Quarterfinals
(United States) USA
(South Korea) SOUTH KOREA
(Japan) JAPAN
(Chile) CHILE
(Mexico) MEXICO
(Bolivia) BOLIVIA
(Puerto Rico) PUERTO RICO
(Canada) CANADA

Semifinals
(United States) USA
(Chile) CHILE
(Mexico) MEXICO
(Canada) CANADA

Final
(United States) USA
(Canada) CANADA

Winners
United States

== Men's singles ==
Round of 64
33	(Panama) Jeff Leon	15, 15
32	(India) Sid Harshavat	13, 2
37	(Tonga) Ram Vamamrav	0, 0
28	(Ecuador) Jose Luis Cueva	15, 15
29	(Philippines) Benjamin Doniego	10, 7
36	(Peru) Robert Bagley	15, 15
35	(Tonga) Joel Tuaileva	2, 5
30	(India) Sanjay Laforest	15, 15
27	(Guatemala) Juan José Salvatierra	15, 15
38	(Switzerland) Enrico Dubach	4, 4
39	(Brazil) Daniel Cabral	5, 3
26	(Ecuador) Santiago Ugalde	15, 15
31	Orlando
34	(Belgium) Niklaas Neboutte	WO

Round of 32
(United States) Jack Huczek	15, 15
(Panama) Jeff Leon	0, 0
(Germany) Oliver Bertels	15, 15
(Ukraine) Gary Mazaroff	13, 10
(Japan) Hiroshi Shimizu	15, 15
(Dominican Republic) Leonel Simó	4, 0
(Guatemala) Juan Luis Galvez	3, 4
(Venezuela) Marcelo Leprea	15, 15
(Canada) Brian Istace	15, 15
(Ecuador) José Luis Cueva	7, 5
(Bolivia) Ricardo Monroy	15, 15
(Puerto Rico) D. Marrero	3, 9
(South Korea) Sang-Soo Lee	15, 15
(Netherlands) Michel Veeken	5, 3
(Peru) Robert Bagley	8, 6
(Mexico) Gilberto Mejia	15, 15
(United States) Rocky Carson	15, 15
(India) Sanjay Laforest	12, 10
(Germany) Trevor Meyer	10, 14
(Belize) Matthew Anderson	15, 15
(Japan) Masaru Yoshimura	15, 15
(Dominican Republic) Yamil Isaias	6, 3
(Guatemala) Juan Lose Salvatierra	12, 8
(Venezuela) César Castro	15, 15
(Canada) Vincent Gagnon	15, 15
(Ecuador) Santiago Ugalde	4, 4
(Venezuela) Jorge Zambrana	15, 11, 11
(Puerto Rico) Ward Meyers	8, 15, 3
(South Korea) He-Yun Lee	15, 15
(Netherlands) Pascal Matla	10, 6
(Belgium) Niklaas Deboutte	8, 2
(Mexico) Álvaro Beltrán	15, 15

Round of 16
(United States) Jack Huczek	15, 15
(Germany) Oliver Bertels	0, 0
(Japan) Hiroshi Shimizu	15, 15
(Venezuela) Marcelo Laprea	11, 12
(Canada) Brian Istace	15, 15
(Bolivia) Ricardo Monroy	9, 2
(South Korea) Sang-Soo Lee	10, 5
(Mexico) Gilberto Mejia	15, 15
(United States) Rocky Carson	15, 15
(Belize) Matthew Anderson	3, 4
(Japan) Masaru Yoshimura	12, 15, 4
(Venezuela) César Castro	15, 3, 11
(Canada) Vincent Gagnon	15, 15
(Venezuela) Jorge Zambrana	11, 6
(South Korea) He-Yun Lee	5, 5
(Mexico) Álvaro Beltrán	15, 15

Quarterfinals
(United States) Jack Huczek	15, 15
(Japan) Hiroshi Shimizu	1, 4
(Canada) Brian Istace	15, 15
(Mexico) Gilberto Meija	11, 7
(United States) Rocky Carson	15, 15
(Venezuela) César Castro	3, 13
(Canada) Vincent Gagnon	12, 12
(Mexico) Álvaro Beltrán	15, 15

Semifinals
(United States) Jack Huczek	15, 15
(Canada) Brian Istace	3, 8
(United States) Rocky Carson	10, 12
(Mexico) Álvaro Beltrán	15, 15

Final
(United States) Jack Huczek	15, 15
(Mexico) Álvaro Beltrán	3, 2

Winner
Jack Huczek (United States)

== Women's singles ==
Round of 32
(United States) Cheryl Gudinas	15, 15
(China) Pat Kong	3, 2
(Dominican Republic) Claudine García	15, 15
(Venezuela) Guiomar Matheus	4, 3
(Japan) Toshiko Sakamoto	15, 15
(Guatemala) Jennifer Bendfeldt	4, 4
(Ecuador) Martha Jarrin	0, 0
(Chile) Fabiola Márquez	15, 15
(Mexico) Lupita Torres	15, 15
(India) Ayeesha Khetani	3, 1
(Puerto Rico) Anna Mondonado	9, 15, 1
(Bolivia) Marioly Caballero	15, 3, 11
(South Korea) Jung-Eun Ahn	15, 15
(Netherlands) Mirjam van Rijh	3, 1
(Vietnam) Lan Huynh	3, 0
(Canada) Amanda Dunn	15, 15
(United States) Rhonda Rajsich	15, 15
(France) Carole Enriquez	0, 0
(Dominican Republic) Maylen Gaspar	4, 6
(Venezuela) Lily Geyer	15, 15
(Japan) Etsuko Noda	15, 15
(Guatemala) Lucy Zachrisson	4, 7
(Ecuador) Ivone Carpio	8, 2
(Chile) Angela Grisar	15, 15
(Mexico) Nancy Enriquez	15, 15
(India) Joy Dholakia	1, 0
(Puerto Rico) Vivian Rodríguez	5, 1
(Bolivia) Yaque Parada	15, 15
(South Korea) Mai-He Kwon	5, 15, 8
(Montserrat) Lorraine Galloway	15, 14, 11
(Vietnam) Thao Le	1, 1
(Canada) Lori-Jane Powell	15, 15

Round of 16
(United States) Cheryl Gudinas	15, 15
(Dominican Republic) Claudine García	12, 4
(Japan) Toshiko Sakamoto	15, 15
(Chile) Fabiola Márquez	13, 12
(Mexico) Lupita Torres	15, 15
(Bolivia) Marioly Caballero	3, 2
(South Korea) Jung-Eun Ahn	4, 4
(Canada) Amanda Dunn	15, 15
(United States) Rhonda Rajsich	15, 15
(Venezuela) Lily Geyer	2, 4
(Japan) Etsuko Noda	11, 14
(Chile) Angela Grisar	15, 15
(Mexico) Nancy Enriquez	15, 13, 11
(Bolivia) Yaque Parada	13, 13, 8
(Montserrat) Lorraine Galloway	6, 4
(Canada) Lori-Jane Powell	15, 15

Quarterfinals
(United States) Cheryl Gudinas	15, 15
(Japan) Toshiko Sakamoto	5, 9
(Mexico) Lupita Torres	1, 14
(Canada) Amanda Dunn	15, 15
(United States) Rhonda Rajsich	14, 10
(Chile) Angela Grisar	15, 15
(Mexico) Nancy Enriquez	15, 15
(Canada) Lori-Jane Powell	4, 7

Semifinals
(United States) Cheryl Gudinas	15, 15
(Canada) Amanda Dunn	2, 5
(Chile) Angela Grisar	15, 15
(Mexico) Nancy Enriquez	12, 8

Final
(United States) Cheryl Gudinas	15, 15
(Chile) Angela Grisar	3, 7

Winner
Cheryl Gudinas (United States)

== Men's doubles ==
Round of 32
17	(India) B. Maru & R. Sohoni	15, 15
16	(Tonga) J. Tuailiva & M. Valvala	8, 1

Round of 16
1	(Mexico) Polo Gutierrez & Javier Moreno	15, 15
17	India	5, 8
9	(Bolivia) S. Canedo & F. Mercado	15, 15
8	(Puerto Rico) D. Marrero & W. Myers	2, 12
5	(Argentina) Daniel Maggi & Shai Manzuri	15, 15
12	(South Korea) D. Jang & N. Jang	13, 11
13	(Netherlands) M. V. Holst & R. V. Doezum	10, 15, 0
4	(Venezuela) Jorge Hirsekorn & H. Hernandez	15, 11, 11
3	(United States) Mike Dennison & Shane Vanderson	15, 15
14	(Dominican Republic) Y. Isaias & L. Simó	2, 3
12	(Guatemala) M. Benefeldt & G. Morales	12, 15, 11
6	(Japan) S. Funatani & M. Ono	15, 7, 2
7	(Chile) Pablo Jajre & S. Roessler	15, 15
10	(Germany) Joachim Loof & T. Kniegen	7, 10
15	(Ecuador) J. Cueva & G. Molina	0, 4
2	(Canada) Mike Green & Tom O’Brien	15, 15

Quarterfinals
1	Mexico	15, 15
9	Bolivia	6, 8
5	Argentina	5, 14
4	Venezuela	15, 15
USA	15, 15
Guatemala	13, 7
Chile	8, 6
Canada	15, 15

Semifinals
1	Mexico	15, 15
4	Argentina	11, 12
3	USA	15, 15
2	Canada	14, 11

Final
1	Mexico	8, 15, 6
3	USA	15, 11, 11

Winners
(United States) Mike Dennison & Shane Vanderson

== Women's doubles ==
Round of 16
9	(Dominican Republic) Claudine García & M. Gaspar	7	15	11
8	(South Korea) M. Jang & Y. Lee	15	11	7
5	(Chile) Angela Grisar & F. Marquez	15	15
12	(Guatemala) J. Benfeldt & L. Zachrisson	0	0
13	(India) A. Khetani & J.	1	3
4	(Bolivia) P. Núñez & C. Santos	15	15
3	(Mexico) Susana Acosta & R. Torres	15	15
14	(Ecuador) I. Carpio & M. Jarrin	5	0
11	(Vietnam) L. Huynh & T. Le	0	2
6	(Japan) H. Miyamoto & I. Hashimoto	15	15
7	(Puerto Rico) A. Maldonado & V. Rodriguez	13	15	11
6	(Venezuela) L. Geyer & G. Mathews	15	11	1

Quarterfinals
1	(United States) Jackie Paraiso & Kim Russell	15	15
10	Dominican Republic	3	2
5	Chile	15	6	7
4	Bolivia	10	15	11
3	Mexico	15	15
6	(Japan)	8	11
7	Puerto Rico	7	11
2	(Canada) Josée Grand'Maître & Jennifer Saunders	15	15

Semifinals
1	USA	15	15
4	Bolivia	1	5
3	Mexico	8	15	11
2	Canada	15	5	4

Final
1	USA	15	10	11
2	Mexico	10	15	9

Winners
(United States) Jackie Paraiso & Kim Russell

== See also ==
- Racquetball World Championships
