= Honduras at the Pan American Games =

- IOC code: HON
- NOC: Comité Olímpico Hondureño
- Website: cohonduras.com
- Medals Ranked 35th: Gold 0 Silver 3 Bronze 6 Total 9

Pan American Games appearances (overview)
- 1975; 1979; 1983; 1987; 1991; 1995; 1999; 2003; 2007; 2011; 2015; 2019; 2023

Honduras at the Pan American Games.

== Pan American Games ==
=== Medals by games ===
Year	Host city	1st place, gold medalist(s)	2nd place, silver medalist(s)	3rd place, bronze medalist(s)	Total
1951	Buenos Aires	did not participate			
1955	Mexico City	did not participate			
1959	Chicago	did not participate			
1963	São Paulo	did not participate			
1967	Winnipeg	did not participate			
1971	Cali	did not participate			
1975	Mexico City	0	0	0	0
1979	San Juan	0	0	0	0
1983	Caracas	0	0	0	0
1987	Indianapolis	0	0	0	0
1991	Havana	0	0	0	0
1995	Mar del Plata	0	0	2	2
1999	Winnipeg	0	1	0	1
2003	Santo Domingo	0	0	1	1
2007	Rio de Janeiro	0	0	1	1
2011	Guadalajara	0	0	0	0
2015	Toronto	0	1	0	1
2019	Lima	0	1	1	2
2023	Santiago	0	0	1	1
Total		0	3	6	9

== Junior Pan American Games ==
=== Medals by games ===
Games	Gold	Silver	Bronze	Total	Rank
(Colombia) 2021 Cali-Valle	0	0	1	1	28th
(Paraguay) 2025 Asunción	0	0	0	0	-
Total	0	0	1	1	36th

=== Medals by sport ===
Sport	Gold	Silver	Bronze	Total
Taekwondo	0	0	1	1
Totals (1 entries)	0	0	1	1

=== Medalists ===
Medal	Name	Games	Sport	Event
Bronze	Daniel Martínez Pavón	2021 Cali-Valle	Taekwondo	Men's +80 kg
