= Alan Vera =

Cuban-American wrestler (1990–2024)

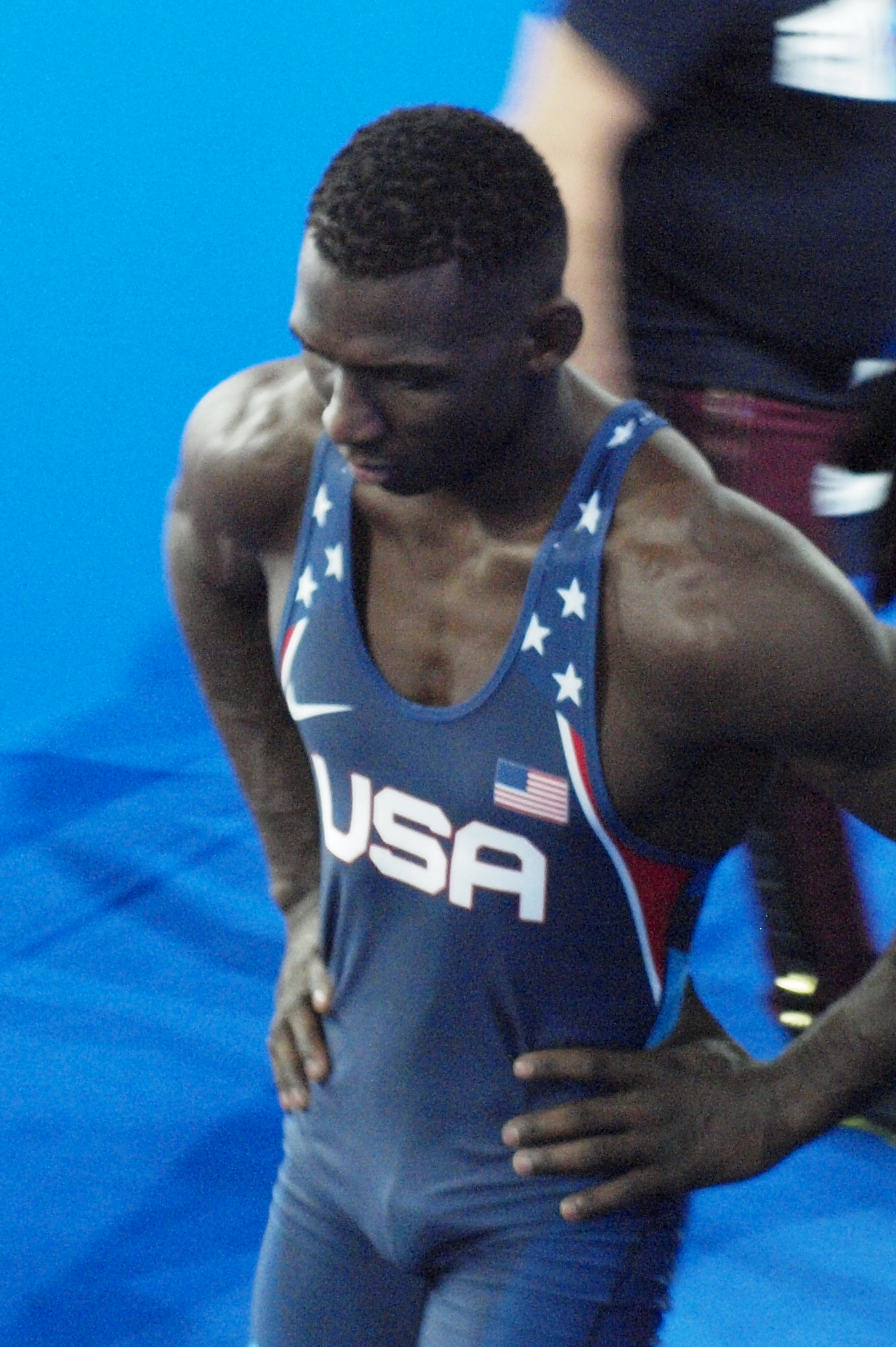
- Vera in 2021

Personal information
- National team: Cuba (2010–2019), United States (2020–2024)
- Born: October 26, 1990 Santiago de Cuba, Cuba
- Died: September 23, 2024 (aged 33) Jersey City, New Jersey, US
- Height: 1.83 m (6 ft 0 in)
- Weight: 97 kg (214 lb; 15 st 4 lb)
- Spouse: Elena Pirozhkova

Sport
- Sport: Greco-Roman wrestling
- Club: New York Athletic Club

Achievements and titles
- Personal best(s): U.S. Olympic Team Trials runner-up Two-time Pan American Championships medalist Two-time Senior World Team member 2021 Senior World Team Trials champion Two-Time Senior Nationals champion 2019 Dave Schultz Memorial International champion 2019 Bill Farrell Memorial Invitational champion
Medal record
Pan American Games
Bronze medal – third place	2015 Toronto	85 kg
Pan American Championships
Bronze medal – third place	2023 Buenos Aires	97 kg

Alan Ernesto Vera García (October 26, 1990 – September 23, 2024) was a Cuban-American Greco-Roman wrestler.

== International career ==
=== Cuba ===
In 2015, he won a bronze medal at the 2015 Pan American Games. In 2016, he won a gold medal at the Pan American Wrestling Championships while competing for Cuba. He would be the Cuban national champion four times.

=== United States ===
Later, he emigrated to the United States, moving to Jersey City, New Jersey in 2017. In 2019 he would begin competing for his adopted country.

In 2023, Vera won a bronze medal at the Pan American Championships for the United States, and in 2024, he won a silver medal at the event for Team USA.

In 2024, Vera qualified the United States for the 2024 Summer Olympics in the 97 kg division at the 2024 Pan-American Olympic Qualification Tournament in Acapulco, Mexico. Vera narrowly missed out representing the U.S. at the Olympics when he came in second place in the U.S. Olympic Wrestling Trials.

== Personal life ==
In 2016, Vera married to Elena Pirozhkova, a former world champion American sport wrestler and two-time Olympian.

In June 2024, the pair welcomed their first child, a daughter.

=== Death ===
On 29 July 2024, Vera suffered cardiac arrest while playing soccer with friends. He was hospitalized and died on September 23, 2024 at the age of 33.
