= Wrestling at the 2015 Pan American Games – Men's Greco-Roman 85 kg =

Men's Greco-Roman 85 kg at the 2015 Pan American Games
- Venue: Mississauga Sports Centre
- Dates: July 15
- Competitors: 7 from 7 nations

Medalists
Gold medal	Jon Anderson	United States
Silver medal	Querys Perez	Venezuela
Bronze medal	Alan Vera	Cuba
Bronze medal	Cristhian Mosquera	Colombia

The Men's Greco-Roman 85 kg competition of the Wrestling events at the 2015 Pan American Games in Toronto were held on July 15 at the Mississauga Sports Centre.

== Schedule ==
All times are Eastern Daylight Time (UTC−4).

Date	Time	Round
July 15, 2015	14:44	Quarterfinals
July 15, 2015	16:14	Semifinals
July 15, 2015	21:26	Bronze medal matches
July 15, 2015	21:44	Final

== Results ==
=== Final ===
Quarterfinals		Semifinals		Finals
		Cristhian Mosquera (COL)	5
Querys Perez (VEN)	6	Querys Perez (VEN)	6
Alfonso Leyva (MEX)	4			Querys Perez (VEN)	0
Jon Anderson (USA)	8			Jon Anderson (USA)	9
Oscar Martinez (HON)	0	Jon Anderson (USA)	8
Luis Betancourt (PUR)	0	Alan Vera (CUB)	0
Alan Vera (CUB)	8

=== Repechage ===
Bronze medal match
Alfonso Leyva (MEX)	0
Cristhian Mosquera (COL)	8
Oscar Martinez (HON)	0
Alan Vera (CUB)	9
