= Honduras at the 2007 Pan American Games =

- IOC code: HON
- NOC: Comité Olímpico Hondureño
- Website: cohonduras.com

in Rio de Janeiro 13–29 July 2007
- Flag bearer: Luis Alonso Morán
- Medals Ranked 25th: Gold 0 Silver 0 Bronze 1 Total 1

Pan American Games appearances (overview)
- 1975; 1979; 1983; 1987; 1991; 1995; 1999; 2003; 2007; 2011; 2015; 2019; 2023

Honduras competed at the 2007 Pan American Games in Rio de Janeiro, Brazil, from 13 July to 29 July.

== Medals ==
=== Bronze ===
===== Weightlifting =====
- Men's – 62 kg: David Mendoza
