= Wrestling at the 2015 Pan American Games – Men's Greco-Roman 98 kg =

Men's Greco-Roman 98 kg at the 2015 Pan American Games
- Venue: Mississauga Sports Centre
- Dates: July 16
- Competitors: 8 from 8 nations

Medalists
Gold medal	Yasmany Lugo	Cuba
Silver medal	Kevin Mejía	Honduras
Bronze medal	Luillys Pérez	Venezuela
Bronze medal	Davi Albino	Brazil

The Men's Greco-Roman 98 kg competition of the Wrestling events at the 2015 Pan American Games in Toronto were held on July 16 at the Mississauga Sports Centre.

== Schedule ==
All times are Eastern Daylight Time (UTC-4).

Date	Time	Round
July 16, 2015	14:44	Quarterfinals
July 16, 2015	15:20	Semifinals
July 16, 2015	20:05	Bronze medal matches
July 16, 2015	20:23	Final

== Results ==
Legend

- F — Won by fall

=== Final ===
Quarterfinals		Semifinals		Finals
José Rocha (MEX)	0
Kevin Mejia (HON)	6	Kevin Mejia (HON)	8
Luillys Perez (VEN)	11	Luillys Perez (VEN)	2
Caylor Williams (USA)	4			Kevin Mejia (HON)	0
Yasmany Lugo (CUB)	9			Yasmany Lugo (CUB)	4^{F}
Oscar Loango (COL)	0	Yasmany Lugo (CUB)	8
Davi Albino (BRA)	10	Davi Albino (BRA)	0
Jeremy Latour (CAN)	1

=== Repechage ===
Bronze medal match
José Rocha (MEX)	0
Luillys Perez (VEN)	4
Oscar Loango (COL)	1
Davi Albino (BRA)	5
