= Shane Vanderson =

American racquetball player

Personal information
- Nickname: Vandy
- Nationality: American
- Born: Shane William Vanderson; May 26, 1981 (age 45) Columbus, Ohio, U.S.
- Height: 6 ft 0 in (183 cm)
- Weight: 190 lb (86 kg)
- Website: shanevanderson.com

Sport
- Country: USA
- Sport: Racquetball
- College team: Baldwin Wallace
- Turned pro: 2003
- Retired: 2012

Achievements and titles
- Highest world ranking: No. 5
Medal record
Men's racquetball
Representing United States
World Championships
Gold medal – first place	2004 Anyang	Doubles
Gold medal – first place	2004 Anyang	Men's Team
Silver medal – second place	2006 Santo Domingo	Singles
Pan American Games
Bronze medal – third place	2011 Guadalajara	Doubles
Silver medal – second place	2011 Guadalajara	Team
Pan Am Championships
Bronze medal – third place	2004 Cuenca	Singles
Silver medal – second place	2004 Cuenca	Doubles

Shane Vanderson (born May 26, 1981) is a retired professional racquetball player. Vanderson was the International Racquetball Tour's (IRT's) #5 player at the end of three seasons: 2006-07, 2007–08, 2009-10. Vanderson finished in the IRT's top 10 for ten consecutive seasons. A native of Ohio, Vanderson was known for having one of the best backhands in racquetball.

== Professional career ==
Vanderson began playing the IRT full-time in 2003-04. That year he made it to the semi-finals of the US Open, defeating Cliff Swain in the Round of 16 and Chris Crowther in the quarter finals before losing to Derek Robinson in four games. He was ranked 10th at the end of that season, and was in the top 10 in each of the ten seasons he was on tour. Those ten seasons in the top 10 put him 7th all time.

The next season, 2004–05, Vanderson made two finals. In February 2005, he was in the San Diego Open final, losing to Swain in four games, and then in April 2005 Vanderson made the Red Swain Memorial final in Boston, where he lost to Jack Huczek in four games.

Vanderson made it to the semi-finals 19 times, including three consecutive US Open semi-finals in 2006, 2007 and 2008, but not to another final.

== International and domestic career ==
Vanderson was on Team USA five times, highlighted by winning the World Championship in Men's Doubles with Mike Dennison in 2004, when they defeated Javier Moreno and Polo Gutierrez of Mexico in the final in Anyang, South Korea. Vanderson was also part of the American men's team that won gold that year at Worlds.

Vanderson was a silver medalist in singles at the 2006 World Championships in Santo Domingo, Dominican Republic, losing to fellow American Jack Huczek in the final.

Vanderson and Dennison both played singles and doubles at the 2004 Pan American Championships. Vanderson was a bronze medalist in singles and silver medalist in doubles.

Vanderson also played singles for USA in the 2005 Pan Am Championships in Caracas, Venezuela, where he lost in the quarter finals to Mexican Gilberto Meija.

Vanderson's last appearance on Team USA was at the 2011 Pan Am Games in Guadalajara, Mexico, and he was a double medalist: bronze with Chris Crowther in men's doubles, and silver in the men's team competition.

While attending Baldwin Wallace College, Vanderson was the USA Racquetball Intercollegiate Singles Champion in 2001, and Doubles Champion in 2002 and 2003 with Andy Hawthorne.

Also, Vanderson was World Junior Champion in Boys U18 in 2000, as well as being US Junior Champion in Boys U18 Doubles in 2000 with Stephen Lewis, and World Junior Champion in U18 Doubles with Lewis in 1999.

== Personal life ==
Vanderson graduated from Baldwin Wallace College in 2003 with a degree in business, and currently resides in Tampa, Florida.

Vanderson is currently a License Partner and real estate agent with Engel & Völkers in Tampa, FL. He is also a member of their Professional Athlete Advisory.

== See also ==
- List of racquetball players
