= Honduras at the 2003 Pan American Games =

- IOC code: HON
- NOC: Comité Olímpico Hondureño
- Website: cohonduras.com

in Santo Domingo 1–17 August 2003
- Flag bearer: Nelson Crisanto
- Medals Ranked 28th: Gold 0 Silver 0 Bronze 1 Total 1

Pan American Games appearances (overview)
- 1975; 1979; 1983; 1987; 1991; 1995; 1999; 2003; 2007; 2011; 2015; 2019; 2023

The 14th Pan American Games were held in Santo Domingo, Dominican Republic from August 1 to August 17, 2003.

== Medals ==
=== Bronze ===
===== Weightlifting =====
- Men's – 56 kg: David Mendoza

== Results by event ==
=== Athletics ===
Track

Athlete	Event	Heat		Final	
Athlete	Event	Time	Rank	Time	Rank
Jonnie Lowe	Men's 400 m hurdles	54.40	15	—	15

=== Swimming ===
==== Men's Competition ====
Athlete	Event	Heat		Final	
Athlete	Event	Time	Rank	Time	Rank
Gustavo Martínez	50 m freestyle	24.71	26	did not advance	
Gustavo Martínez	100 m freestyle	54.74	34	did not advance	

== See also ==
- Honduras at the 2004 Summer Olympics
