= Luillys Pérez =

Venezuelan Greco-Roman wrestler (born 1990)

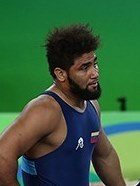
- Pérez at 2016 Summer Olympics

Personal information
- Full name: Luillys José Pérez Mora
- Born: 23 December 1990 (age 35) Coro, Falcón, Venezuela
- Height: 190 cm (6 ft 3 in) (2019)

Sport
- Sport: Greco-Roman wrestling
- Weight class: -97 kg
Medal record
Men's Greco-Roman wrestling
Representing Venezuela
Pan American Games
Silver medal – second place	2023 Santiago	-97 kg
Bronze medal – third place	2015 Toronto	-98 kg
Bronze medal – third place	2019 Lima	-97 kg
Central American and Caribbean Games
Gold medal – first place	2018 Barranquilla	-97 kg
South American Games
Gold medal – first place	2018 Cochabamba	-97 kg
Gold medal – first place	2022 Asunción	-97 kg
Bolivarian Games
Gold medal – first place	2022 Valledupar	-97 kg
Pan American Championships
Gold medal – first place	2018 Lima	-97 kg
Silver medal – second place	2016 Frisco	-98 kg
Silver medal – second place	2017 Lauro de Freitas	-98 kg
Bronze medal – third place	2012 Colorado Springs	-74 kg
Bronze medal – third place	2014 Ciudad de México	-98 kg
Bronze medal – third place	2015 Santiago	98 kg
Bronze medal – third place	2019 Buenos Aires	-97 kg
Bronze medal – third place	2020 Ottawa	-97 kg
Bronze medal – third place	2024 Acapulco	-97 kg

Luillys José Pérez Mora (Note: In this Spanish name, the first or paternal surname is Pérez and the second or maternal family name is Mora.) (born 23 December 1990) is a Venezuelan Greco-Roman wrestler. He competed in the men's Greco-Roman 98 kg event at the 2016 Summer Olympics, in which he was eliminated in the round of 16 by Ghasem Rezaei.

In 2019, he competed in the men's Greco-Roman 97 kg event at the World Wrestling Championships held in Nur-Sultan, Kazakhstan.

He won the gold medal in his event at the 2022 South American Games held in Asunción, Paraguay.

Pérez won a bronze medal in his event at the 2024 Pan American Wrestling Championships held in Acapulco, Mexico. A few days later, he competed at the 2024 Pan American Wrestling Olympic Qualification Tournament held in Acapulco, Mexico hoping to qualify for the 2024 Summer Olympics in Paris, France. He was eliminated in his second match.
