= Chris Crowther =

American racquetball player

Personal information
- Nationality: American
- Born: November 6, 1978 (age 47) Yorba Linda, California
- Height: 6 ft 6 in (198 cm)
- Weight: 225 lb (102 kg)

Sport
- Sport: Racquetball
- College team: California, Riverside
- Turned pro: 2001

Achievements and titles
- Highest world ranking: No. 5
Medal record
Bronze medal – third place	2011 Pan Am Games	Doubles
Silver medal – second place	2011 Pan Am Games	Team
Silver medal – second place	2011 Pan American Championships	Singles
Bronze medal – third place	2007 Pan American Championships	Singles

Chris Crowther (born November 6, 1978) is a professional racquetball player. Crowther was the #5 player on the International Racquetball Tour at the end of the 2010–11 season, which was a career high and the sixth season he'd finished in the IRT's top 10 players. A California native, Crowther is the tallest player on the IRT and known for his strong drive serve and hard hitting playing style.

== Professional career ==
Crowther played his first IRT match in May 1997, losing to Cliff Swain in three games, he wasn't full-time until the 2001–02 season, when he played the US Open for the first time, making it to the Round of 16, when he again lost to Swain.

Crowther made the finals of an IRT event for the first time in September 2010 at the Cali Colombia Grand Slam event, losing to Kane Waselenchuk in four games. Crowther made his second final in October 2011 at the Red Swaine Shootout in Davison, Michigan, again losing to Waselenchuk.

== International career ==
Crowther has represented the USA four times, three times in singles and once in doubles. In singles, he was silver medalist at the 2011 Pan American Championships, losing the final to Mexican Daniel De La Rosa. In his first appearance on Team USA in 2007, Crowther was bronze medalist at the Pan American Championships, and he also played at that event in 2009.

In doubles, Crowther was a bronze medalist with Shane Vanderson at the 2011 Pan Am Games. He played singles and doubles in the team competition of those games, helping the US to a silver medal.

== Personal life ==
Crowther graduated from the University of California at Riverside. He currently resides in San Diego.

== See also ==
- List of racquetball players
