= Yasmany Lugo =

Cuban Greco-Roman wrestler (born 1990)

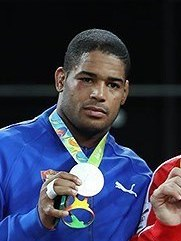

Personal information
- Full name: Yasmany Daniel Lugo Cabrera
- Born: 24 January 1990 (age 36) Pinar del Río, Cuba
- Height: 1.90 m (6 ft 3 in)
- Weight: 98 kg (216 lb)

Sport
- Sport: Wrestling
- Event: Greco-Roman
- Club: Cerro Pelado Habana
- Coached by: Juan Carlos Linares; Pedro Val; Carlos Ulacia
Medal record
Men's Greco-Roman wrestling
Representing Cuba
Olympic Games
Silver medal – second place	2016 Rio de Janeiro	98 kg
Pan American Games
Gold medal – first place	2015 Toronto	98 kg

Yasmany Lugo (born 24 January 1990) is a Cuban Greco-Roman wrestler. He won the silver medal at the 2016 Summer Olympics in the men's Greco-Roman 98 kg category.
