= Jon Anderson (wrestler) =

American Greco-Roman wrestler

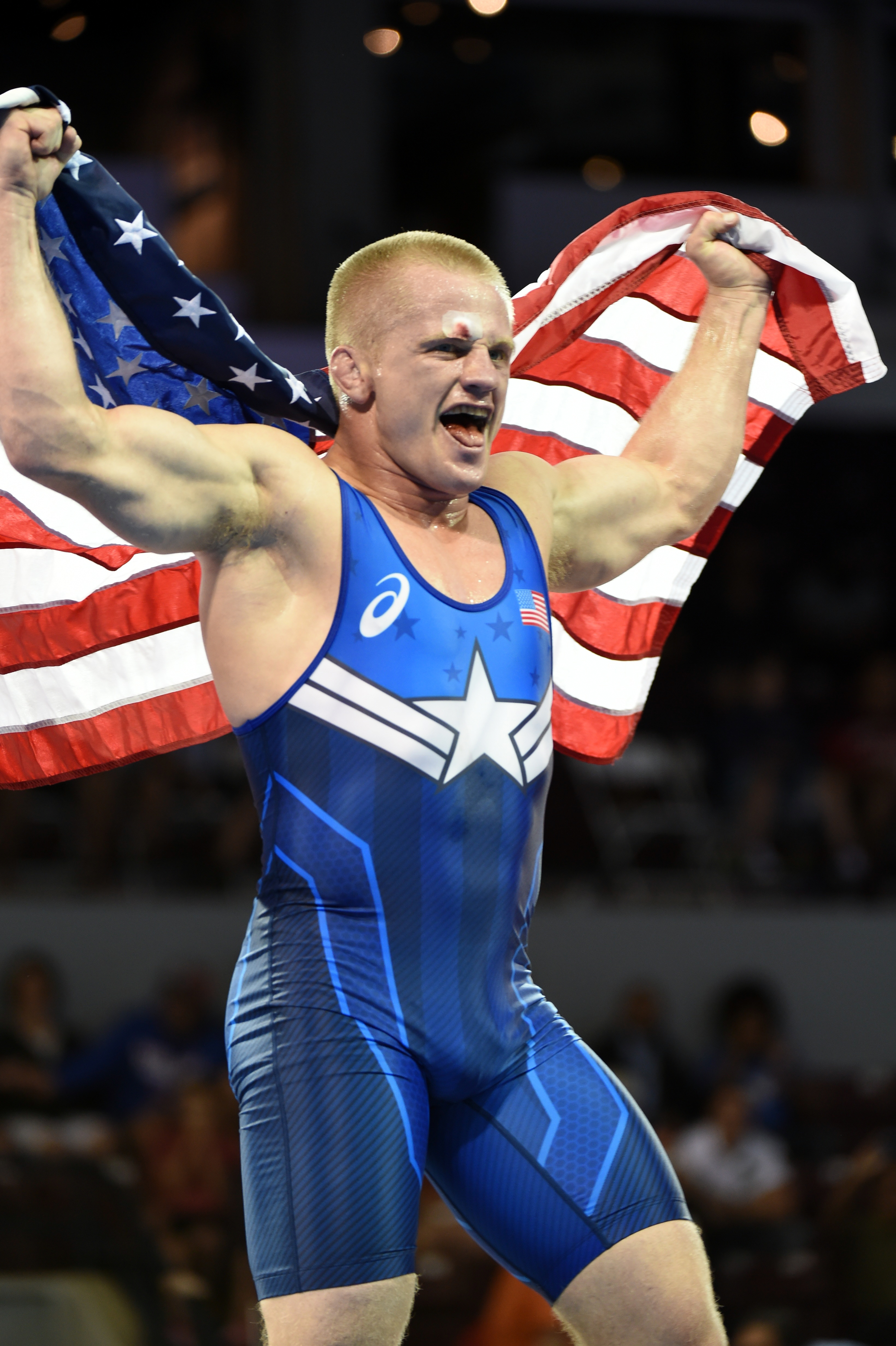
- Anderson at the 2015 Pan American Games

Personal information
- Born: September 5, 1984 (age 41)
- Height: 5 ft 9 in (175 cm)

Sport
- Sport: Greco-Roman wrestling
- Club: U.S. Army
Medal record
Men's Greco-Roman wrestling
Representing the United States
Pan American Games
Gold medal – first place	2015 Toronto	85 kg

Jon Anderson (born September 5, 1984) is an American Greco-Roman wrestler, who won a gold medal in the 85 kg division at the 2015 Pan American Games.

Anderson was born to Greg and Rhonda Anderson. He has two sisters, Jennifer and Madison. He is married to Molly and has two sons, MacArthur and Theodore. He also holds a blue belt in Brazilian jiu-jitsu, and is a member of the U.S. wrestling team since 2012.
