= Honduras at the 2023 Pan American Games =

- IOC code: HON
- NOC: Honduran Olympic Committee

in Santiago, Chile 20 October 2023 – 5 November 2023
- Competitors: 42 in 9 sports
- Flag bearers (opening): Julio Horrego & Natalie Espinal
- Flag bearer (closing): TBD
- Medals Ranked =31st: Gold 0 Silver 0 Bronze 1 Total 1

Pan American Games appearances (overview)
- 1975; 1979; 1983; 1987; 1991; 1995; 1999; 2003; 2007; 2011; 2015; 2019; 2023

Honduras is scheduled to compete at the 2023 Pan American Games in Santiago, Chile from October 20 to November 5, 2023. This was Honduras's 13th appearance at the Pan American Games, having competed at every Games since 1975.

On October 12, 2023, a team of 42 athletes (31 men and 11 women) competing in nine sports was named by the Honduran Olympic Committee. Swimmer Marcos Moneta and tennis player Natalie Espinal were the country's flagbearers during the opening ceremony.

== Medalists ==
The following Honduran competitors won medals at the games. In the by discipline sections below, medalists' names are bolded.

Medal	Name	Sport	Event	Date
Bronze	Kevin Mejía	Wrestling	Men's Greco-Roman 97 kg	November 4

== Competitors ==
The following is the list of number of competitors (per gender) participating at the games per sport/discipline.

Sport	Men	Women	Total
Athletics	1	0	1
Cycling	1	0	1
Football	18	0	18
Rowing	1	0	1
Shooting	0	2	2
Swimming	4	3	7
Taekwondo	1	1	2
Tennis	1	2	3
Weightlifting	1	2	3
Wrestling	4	1	5
Total	32	11	43

== Athletics (track and field) ==
Honduras qualified one male field athlete.

Key

- Note–Ranks given for track events are within the athlete's heat only
- **Q** = Qualified for the next round
- **q** = Qualified for the next round as a fastest loser
- Bye = Athlete not required to compete in round

Field events

Athlete	Event	Final	
Athlete	Event	Distance	Position
Zachary Short	Men's shot put	17.81	10

== Cycling ==
=== Mountain biking ===
Honduras qualified one male mountain biker at the 2023 Pan American Championships.

Athlete	Event	Time	Rank
Luis López	Men's cross-country	1:26:59	14

=== Road ===
Honduras qualified one male road cyclist.

Athlete	Event	Time	Rank
Luis López	Men's road race	3:48.31	29

== Football ==
Summary

Key:

- A.E.T – After extra time.
- P – Match decided by penalty-shootout.

Team	Event	Group Stage				Semifinal	Final / BM	
Team	Event	Opposition Score	Opposition Score	Opposition Score	Rank	Opposition Score	Opposition Score	Rank
Honduras men's	Men's tournament	Colombia; **L** 0–2	United States; **L** 1–2	Brazil; **L** 0–3	4	Did not advance	Seventh place match Dominican Republic; **W** 3–1	7

=== Men's tournament ===
Honduras qualified a men's team of 18 athletes after finishing as the top ranked Central American team at the 2022 CONCACAF U-20 Championship in the Dominican Republic.

Group stage

Pos	Team	Pld	W	D	L	GF	GA	GD	Pts	Qualification
1	Brazil	3	3	0	0	6	0	+6	**9**	Semi-finals
2	United States	3	2	0	1	4	2	+2	**6**	Semi-finals
3	Colombia	3	1	0	2	2	4	−2	**3**	Fifth place match
4	Honduras	3	0	0	3	1	7	−6	**0**	Seventh place match

Source: Santiago2023
23 October 2023
13:00

Colombia	2–0	Honduras
Ruiz 16'; Cortés 41'	Report

Estadio Elías Figueroa Brander, Valparaíso
Referee: Fernando Véjar Diaz (Chile)

26 October 2023
15:00

United States	2–1	Honduras
Leyva 72'; Ku-DiPietro 90'	Report	García 19'

Estadio Sausalito, Viña del Mar
Referee: Manuel Vergara (Chile)

29 October 2023
13:00

Brazil	3–0	Honduras
Ronald 50'; Martins 54'; Lara 79'	Report

Estadio Sausalito, Viña del Mar
Referee: José Matos Uzcategui (Venezuela)

Seventh place match

1 November 2023
14:00

Dominican Republic	1–3	Honduras
Ciriaco 40'	Report	Miranda 11'; Carter 45'; Ochoa 88'

Estadio Sausalito, Viña del Mar
Referee: Juan Andrade (Ecuador)

== Rowing ==
Honduras qualified one male rower.

Men

Athlete	Event	Heat		Repechage		Semifinal		Final A/B	
Athlete	Event	Time	Rank	Time	Rank	Time	Rank	Time	Rank
Elian Ávila	Single sculls	7:55.90	3 **R**	7:33.72	4 **FC**	—N/a		7:39.33	14

== Shooting ==
Honduras qualified two female shooters.

Women

Athlete	Event	Qualification		Final	
Athlete	Event	Points	Rank	Points	Rank
Ashley Gallo	10 m air pistol	547	21	Did not advance	
Sthephany Gallo	10 m air pistol	554	17	Did not advance	

== Swimming ==
Honduras qualified seven swimmers (four men and three women).

Men

Athlete	Event	Heat		Final	
Athlete	Event	Time	Rank	Time	Rank
Gabriel Martínez	50 m freestyle	23.59	22	Did not advance	
Gabriel Martínez	100 m freestyle	52.00	20	Did not advance	
Gabriel Martínez	200 m freestyle	1:55.69	17 **q**	1:56.36	16
Diego Dulieu	400 m freestyle	4:02.45	15 **q**	4:02.86	13
Diego Dulieu	800 m freestyle	—N/a		8:16.48	12
Diego Dulieu	1500 m freestyle	—N/a		15:42.82	9
Julio Horrego	200 m breaststroke	Did not start		Did not advance	
Carlos Vásquez	100 m butterfly	55.14	18	Did not advance	
Carlos Vásquez	200 m butterfly	2:06.86	16 **q**	2:05.28	13
Diego Dulieu	10 km open water	—N/a		1:53:30.8	14

Women

Athlete	Event	Heat		Final	
Athlete	Event	Time	Rank	Time	Rank
Julimar Ávila	100 m freestyle	58.56	25	Did not advance	
Julimar Ávila	200 m freestyle	2:07.59	18 **q**	2:05.74	14
Julimar Ávila	100 m butterfly	1:03.36	21	Did not advance	
Michell Ramírez	400 m freestyle	4:33.45	15 **q**	4:32.70	15
Michell Ramírez	800 m freestyle	—N/a		9:36.50	14
Michell Ramírez	200 m butterfly	2:22.68	15 **q**	2:22.42	14
Paola Cwu	100 m breaststroke	1:20.43	23	Did not advance	
Paola Cwu	200 m breaststroke	2:51.90	21	Did not advance	
Paola Cwu	200 m individual medley	2:33.54	24	Did not advance	
Michell Ramírez	10 km open water	—N/a		2:16:48.1	17

== Taekwondo ==
Honduras qualified two athletes during the Pan American Games Qualification Tournament.

Kyorugi

Men

Athlete	Event	Round of 16	Quarterfinals	Semifinals	Repechage	Final/ BM	
Athlete	Event	Opposition Result	Opposition Result	Opposition Result	Opposition Result	Opposition Result	Rank
Miguel Ferrera	+80 kg	Álvarez (VEN); **L** 0–2	Did not advance				

Women

Athlete	Event	Round of 16	Quarterfinals	Semifinals	Repechage	Final/ BM	
Athlete	Event	Opposition Result	Opposition Result	Opposition Result	Opposition Result	Opposition Result	Rank
Yosselyn Molina	–67 kg	Lee (HAI); **L** 0–2	Did not advance		Gallardo (CHI); **L** 0–2	Did not advance	

== Tennis ==
Honduras qualified a total of three tennis players (one man and two women).

Men

Athlete	Event	Round of 64	Round of 32	Round of 16	Quarterfinal	Semifinal	Final / BM	
Athlete	Event	Opposition Result	Opposition Result	Opposition Result	Opposition Result	Opposition Result	Opposition Result	Rank
Alejandro Obando	Singles	Soriano (COL); **L** 1–6, 1–6	Did not advance					

Women

Athlete	Event	Round of 64	Round of 32	Round of 16	Quarterfinal	Semifinal	Final / BM	
Athlete	Event	Opposition Result	Opposition Result	Opposition Result	Opposition Result	Opposition Result	Opposition Result	Rank
Natalie Espinal	Singles	Bye	Riera (ARG); **L** 2–6, 1–6	Did not advance				
Daniela Obando	Singles	Valdés (CUB); **W** 6–0, 6–3	Lizarazo (COL); **L** 0–6, 1–6	Did not advance				
Natalie Espinal; Daniela Obando	Doubles	—N/a	Bye	Licht / Rodriguez (URU); **L** 6–3, 6–7^{(8–10)}, [10–12]	Did not advance			

Mixed

Athlete	Event	Round of 16	Quarterfinal	Semifinal	Final / BM	
Athlete	Event	Opposition Result	Opposition Result	Opposition Result	Opposition Result	Rank
Alejandro Obando; Natalie Espinal	Doubles	Boulais / Marino (CAN); **L** 4–6, 2–6	Did not advance			

== Weightlifting ==
Honduras qualified three weightlifters (two men and one woman).

Men

Athlete	Event	Snatch		Clean & Jerk		Total	
Athlete	Event	Result	Rank	Result	Rank	Result	Rank
Jorge Hernández	–73 kg	128	9	166	5	294	8
Axel Pavón	–89 kg	140	9	180	8	320	8

Women

Athlete	Event	Snatch		Clean & Jerk		Total	
Athlete	Event	Result	Rank	Result	Rank	Result	Rank
Sofía Alemán	–59 kg	78	9	NM		DSQ	

== Wrestling ==
Honduras qualified five wrestlers (four men and one woman) through the 2022 Pan American Wrestling Championships and the 2023 Pan American Wrestling Championships.

Key:

- VT – Victory by fall.
- PP – Decision by points – the loser with technical points.
- PO – Decision by points – the loser without technical points.
- SP – Technical superiority – the loser with technical points and a margin of victory of at least 9 (Greco-Roman) or 10 (freestyle) points.
- ST – Great superiority – the loser without technical points and a margin of victory of at least 8 (Greco-Roman) or 10 (freestyle) points.
- VA – Decision by withdrawal

Men

Athlete	Event	Round of 16	Quarterfinal	Semifinal	Final / BM	
Athlete	Event	Opposition Result	Opposition Result	Opposition Result	Opposition Result	Rank
Luis Barrios	Freestyle 74 kg					
Ariel Alfonso	Greco-Roman 87 kg					
Kevin Mejía	Greco-Roman 97 kg					
Gino Ávila	Greco-Roman 130 kg					

Women

Athlete	Event	Round of 16	Quarterfinal	Semifinal	Final / BM	
Athlete	Event	Opposition Result	Opposition Result	Opposition Result	Opposition Result	Rank
Saidy Chávez	Freestyle 68 kg					

== See also ==
- Honduras at the 2023 Parapan American Games
- Honduras at the 2024 Summer Olympics
