= Honduras at the 2011 Pan American Games =

- IOC code: HON
- NOC: Comité Olímpico Hondureño
- Website: cohonduras.com

in Guadalajara 14–30 October 2011
- Competitors: 23 in 9 sports
- Flag bearer: Randy Lambert
- Medals: Gold 0 Silver 0 Bronze 0 Total 0

Pan American Games appearances (overview)
- 1975; 1979; 1983; 1987; 1991; 1995; 1999; 2003; 2007; 2011; 2015; 2019; 2023

Honduras competed at the 2011 Pan American Games in Guadalajara, Mexico from October 14 to 30, 2011. Honduras sent 23 athletes and compete in nine sports.

== Athletics ==
Honduras qualified six athletes.

=== Track and road events ===
Event	Athletes	Heats		Semifinal		Final	
Event	Athletes	Time	Rank	Time	Rank	Time	Rank
100 m	Rolando Palacios	10.49 SB	5th	Did not advance			
200 m	Rolando Palacios	20.90	3rd Q	20.70 SB	2nd Q	20.77	5th
110 m hurdles	Ronald Bennett			13.81 PB	6th	Did not advance	
4 × 100 m relay	Rolando Palacios; Ronald Bennett; Joseph Norales; Helson Pitillo			DNF		Did not advance	

=== Field events ===
Event	Athletes	Semifinal		Final		
Event	Athletes	Result	Rank	Result	Rank	
Long jump	Kessel Campbell	7.29 m	10th			Did not advance

=== Track and road events ===
Event	Athletes	Semifinal		Final	
Event	Athletes	Result	Rank	Result	Rank
Jeimmy Bernardez	100 m hurdles	13.92	5th	Did not advance	

== Equestrian ==
Honduras qualified one athlete in equestrian.

=== Dressage ===
Athlete	Horse	Event	Grand Prix		Grand Prix Special		Grand Prix Freestyle		Final Score	Rank
Athlete	Horse	Event	Score	Rank	Score	Rank	Score	Rank	Final Score	Rank
Karen Atala	Weissenfels	Individual	61.237	34th	Did not advance					

== Judo ==
Honduras qualified one athlete in the 60 kg men's category.

Men

Athlete	Event	Round of 16	Quarterfinals	Semifinals	Final
Athlete	Event	Opposition Result	Opposition Result	Opposition Result	Opposition Result
Kenny Godoy	-60 kg		Juan Postigos (PER); L 000 S4 – 100	Did not advance (to repechage round)	

Repechage Rounds

Athlete	Event	Repechage 8	Repechage Final	Bronze Final
Athlete	Event	Opposition Result	Opposition Result	Opposition Result
Kenny Godoy	-60 kg		Frazer Will (CAN); L 000 S1 – 100	Did not advance

== Racquetball ==
Honduras qualified two male athletes in racquetball.

=== Men ===
Athlete	Event	Preliminary round (2 or 3)	Round of 32	Round of 16	Quarterfinals	Semifinals	Final
Athlete	Event	Opposition Score	Opposition Score	Opposition Score	Opposition Score	Opposition Score	Opposition Score
Raul Banegas	Singles	Álvaro Beltrán (MEX); L 4 – 15, 11 – 15; Cesar Castillo (VEN); L 13 – 15, 2 – 15; Juan S. Herrera (COL); L 12 – 15, 5 – 15	Alex Ackermann (USA); L 12 – 15, 5 – 15	Did not advance			
Selvin Cruz	Singles	Gilberto Mejia (MEX); L 3 – 15, 3 – 15; Alex Ackermann (USA); L 3 – 15, 6 – 15; Fernando Rios (ECU); L 7 – 15, 4 – 15	Felipe Camacho (CRC); L 8 – 15, 11 – 15	Did not advance			
Selvin Cruz; Raul Banegas	Doubles	Ramon De Leon (Dominican Republic) Luis A Perez (DOM); L 15 – 11, 13 – 15, 2 – 11; Daniel Maggi (Argentina) Shai Manzuri (ARG); L 12 – 15, 9 – 15; Timothy Landeryou (Canada) Kristofer Odegard (CAN); L 7 – 15, 2 – 15		Jorge Hirsekorn (Venezuela) Cesar Castillo (VEN); L 10 – 15, 7 – 15	Did not advance		
Selvin Cruz; Raul Banegas	Team			Bolivia; L 0 – 2, 0 – 2	Did not advance		

== Rowing ==
=== Men ===
Athlete(s)	Event	Heats		Repechage		Final	
Athlete(s)	Event	Time	Rank	Time	Rank	Time	Rank
Luis Aguilar; Wilton Tatum	Lightweight double sculls (LM2x)	7:38.01	5th R	7:48.91	5th qB	DNS	

== Swimming ==
Honduras qualified five swimmers.

Men

Event	Athletes	Heats		Final	
Event	Athletes	Time	Position	Time	Position
400 m Freestyle	Allan Gutierrez	4:20.17	14th qB	4:19.71	6th B

Women

Athlete	Event	Heats		Final	
Athlete	Event	Time	Rank	Time	Rank
100 m Freestyle	Julimar Avila	1:00.15	17th qB	1:00.51	8th B
100 m Backstroke	Karen Vilorio	1:07.06	18th	Did not advance	
200 m Backstroke	Karen Vilorio	2:26.58	14th qB	2:25.99	7th B
100 m Butterfly	Julimar Avila	1:06.86	21st	Did not advance	
200 m Individual Medley	Ana Castellanos	2:28.03	14th qB	2:27.31	7th B
400 m Individual Medley	Ana Castellanos	5:26.80	20th	Did not advance	
400 m Individual Medley	Karen Vilorio	5:27.31	22nd	Did not advance	

== Taekwondo ==
Honduras qualified two athletes in the 49 kg women's and +80 kg men's categories.

Men

Athlete	Event	Round of 16	Quarterfinals	Semifinals	Final
Athlete	Event	Opposition Result	Opposition Result	Opposition Result	Opposition Result
Miguel Ferrera	Lightweight (+80kg)	Sanon Tudor (HAI); W 12 – 4	Robelis Despaigne (CUB); L 0 – 8	Did not advance	

Women

Athlete	Event	Round of 16	Quarterfinals	Semifinals	Final
Athlete	Event	Opposition Result	Opposition Result	Opposition Result	Opposition Result
Andrea Erazo	Flyweight (-49kg)	Monica Olarte (VEN); L 2 – 5	Did not advance		

== Weightlifting ==
Honduras qualified one male athlete in weightlifting and has received a wildcard to send one female athlete.

Athlete	Event	Snatch			Clean & jerk			Total	Rank
Athlete	Event	Attempt 1	Attempt 2	Attempt 3	Attempt 1	Attempt 2	Attempt 3	Total	Rank
Joel Pavon	Men's 94 kg	~~130~~	130	135	170	175	~~177~~	310	9th
Tumy Gomez	Women's 53 kg	50	54	56	65	~~70~~	~~70~~	121	11th

== Wrestling ==
Honduras qualified one athlete in the 96 kg men's freestyle category and one athlete in the 96 kg men's Greco-Roman category, and received one wild card for the 66 kg freestyle men's event.

Men

Freestyle

Athlete	Event	Quarterfinals	Semifinals	Final
Athlete	Event	Opposition Result	Opposition Result	Opposition Result
Randy Lambert	96 kg		Juan Esteban Martínez (COL); L PO 0 – 3	Did not advance

Greco-Roman

Athlete	Event	Round of 16	Quarterfinals	Semifinals	Final
Athlete	Event	Opposition Result	Opposition Result	Opposition Result	Opposition Result
Jefrin Mejia	66 kg		Anyelo Mota (DOM); L PO 0 – 3		Bronze medal match: Ulises Barragan (MEX); L PO 0 – 3
Randy Lambert	96 kg		Raul Angulo (COL); L PP 1 – 3		Bronze medal match: Yuri Maier (ARG); L VT 0 – 5
