= Gymnastics at the 2027 Pan American Games – Qualification =

The following is the qualification system and qualified nations for the Gymnastics at the 2027 Pan American Games competition to be held in Lima, Peru.

== Qualification timeline ==
Event	Date	Venue
2021 Junior Pan American Games	August 11–22	(Paraguay) Asuncion
2026 Pan American Trampoline and Tumbling Championships	May 22–24	(Colombia) Medellín
2026 Pan American Rhythmic Gymnastics Championships	June 5–7	(Brazil) Rio de Janeiro
2026 Pan American Artistic Gymnastics Championships	June 17–21	(Brazil) Rio de Janeiro

== Qualification summary ==
- In Artistic Gymnastics, NOCs with 5+ entered gymnasts may also enter the team competition.
- In Trampoline, NOCs with at least 2 entered gymnasts in each gender may also enter each gender's synchronized competition.

Nation	Artistic		Rhythmic		Trampoline		Total
Nation	Men	Women	Individual	Group	Men	Women	Total
Argentina	5	5	2	0	2	1	15
Aruba	0	1	0	0	0	0	1
Bolivia	1	0	0	0	0	0	1
Brazil	5	5	2	5	2	2	21
Canada	5	5	2	5	2	2	21
Cayman Islands	1	0	0	0	0	0	1
Chile	5	2	0	5	0	0	12
Colombia	6	2	1	0	1	2	12
Costa Rica	1	5	1	0	0	0	7
Cuba	1	1	1	0	0	0	3
Dominican Republic	2	2	0	0	0	0	4
Ecuador	2	5	0	0	0	0	7
El Salvador	0	1	0	0	0	0	1
Guatemala	2	1	1	0	0	0	4
Honduras	0	1	0	0	0	0	1
Jamaica	1	1	0	0	0	0	2
Mexico	5	5	2	5	2	2	21
Panama	1	5	0	0	0	0	6
Peru	5	5	1	5	0	1	17
Puerto Rico	5	2	0	0	0	0	7
Trinidad and Tobago	2	0	0	0	0	0	2
United States	5	6	3	5	3	3	25
Venezuela	1	1	2	5	1	0	10
Total: 23 NOCs	61	61	18	35	13	13	201

== Artistic ==
A total of 122 artistic gymnasts (61 per gender) will qualify. The top nine teams in each event qualified five gymnasts each (with one being the host nation Chile). Teams 10-13 each qualified two gymnasts each. A further seven spots were available (per gender) for individual qualification (with a maximum of one quota per gender per nation). The winners of the individual all-around competition at the 2025 Junior Pan American Games also qualified directly for the games. A nation could qualify a maximum five athletes per gender (with the winners of the Junior Pan American Games being an additional number for their respective NOC's).

=== Men ===
Event	Criterion	Qualified	Gymnasts per NOC	Total
2025 Junior Pan American Games	Individual all-around winner	Thomas Mejía (COL)	1	1
2026 Pan American Championships	Teams 1–9	Canada; Colombia; United States; Brazil; Puerto Rico; Argentina; Mexico; Chile; Peru*	5	45
2026 Pan American Championships	Teams places 10–13	Guatemala; Ecuador; Dominican Republic; Trinidad and Tobago	2	8
2026 Pan American Championships	Individual all around top 7 countries not already qualified	Cuba; Jamaica; Panama; Venezuela; Cayman Islands; Costa Rica; Bolivia	1	7
TOTAL				61

- Peru finished 10th and as host nation was awarded the 9th qualifying team spot.

=== Women ===
Event	Criterion	Qualified	Gymnasts per NOC	Total
2025 Junior Pan American Games	Individual all-around winner	Bernice Charleigh (USA)	1	1
2026 Pan American Championship	Teams 1–9	United States; Brazil; Canada; Argentina; Mexico; Panama; Costa Rica; Ecuador; Peru*	5	45
2026 Pan American Championship	Teams places 10–13	Puerto Rico; Colombia; Dominican Republic; Chile	2	8
2026 Pan American Championship	Individual all around top 7 countries not already qualified	Jamaica; Cuba; Guatemala; Venezuela; El Salvador; Honduras; Aruba	1	7
TOTAL				61

- Peru finished 11th and as host nation was awarded the 9th qualifying team spot.

== Rhythmic ==
The top six nations in the team event at the Pan American Championship qualified two gymnasts. The last four spots went to the top four nations in the individual event, that have not earned any quotas (each with one gymnast). The top six nations in the group event also qualified, with each group consisting of 5 gymnasts. If the host nation has not qualified, an additional six quotas are available (one in individual and five for group). The winner of the individual all-around competition at the 2025 Junior Pan American Games also qualified directly for the games.

=== Individual ===
Event	Gymnasts per NOC	Qualified
2025 Junior Pan American Games	1	Natalie de la Rosa (USA)
Host NOC	1	Peru
2026 Pan American Championships – individual event	2	Brazil; United States; Mexico; Canada; Argentina; Venezuela
2026 Pan American Championships – individual event	1	Costa Rica; Colombia; Cuba; Guatemala
TOTAL	18	

=== Group ===
Event	Gymnasts per NOC	Qualified
Host NOC	1	Peru
2026 Pan American Championship group event	6	Brazil; United States; Mexico; Canada; Chile; Venezuela
TOTAL	35	

== Trampoline ==
The winners of the 2025 Junior Pan American Games qualified automatically. The top five countries (determined by the second placing athlete per nation) each qualified two athletes. The last two spots were awarded to the next two best placed nations. The host nation Peru was guaranteed a spot for its best ranked athlete (male or female), if it failed to qualify (only if it competed at the 2026 Pan American Trampoline Championships).

Event	Quotas	Men	Women
2025 Junior Pan American Games	1	Ryan Maccagnan (USA)	Kennedi Roberts (USA)
2026 Pan American Championships	10	United States; United States; Brazil; Argentina; Mexico; Brazil; Mexico; Canada; Canada; Argentina	United States; Brazil; United States; Mexico; Canada; Colombia; Brazil; Mexico; Canada; Colombia
2026 Pan American Championships	2	Colombia; Venezuela	Argentina; Peru
Total	13		

- Peru finished 24th in the women's competition and as host nation was awarded the 12th spot.

== See also ==
- Gymnastics at the 2028 Summer Olympics – Qualification
