= Judo at the 2027 Pan American Games – Qualification =

The following is the qualification system and qualified athletes for the judo at the 2027 Pan American Games competitions.

== Qualification system ==
A total of up to 154 judokas will qualify to compete at the games. One quota per each weight category were directly allocated to the gold medal winners in the Asuncion 2025 Junior Pan American Games. The top nine athletes (one per NOC) in each weight category's ranking after the four best results among eleven qualification tournaments will qualify along with one spot per category for the host nation, Peru. Each nation can enter a maximum of 14 athletes (seven men and seven women), except for NOCs whose athletes qualified by quota for Asuncion 2025 and may have a maximum of two athletes in one weight category.

For the team event, a county must qualify at least one athlete in each of the following categories:

- Women 57kg (48 kg, 52 kg, 57 kg)
- Men 73kg (60 kg, 66 kg, 73 kg)
- Women 70kg (57 kg, 63 kg, 70 kg)
- Men 90kg (73 kg, 81 kg, 90 kg)
- Women +70kg (70 kg, 78 kg, +78 kg)
- Men +90kg (90 kg, 100 kg, +100 kg)

== Qualification timeline ==
Events	Date	Venue
2021 Junior Pan American Games	August 10–13, 2025	(Paraguay) Asuncion
2026 Pan American Judo Championships	April 18–19, 2026	(Peru) Panama City
Pan American Open	June 20–21, 2026	(Argentina) Buenos Aires
Pan American Open	June 26–27, 2026	(Chile) Santiago
Pan American Open	August 18, 2026	(Peru) Lima
Pan American Open	September 5–6, 2026	(El Salvador) San Salvador
Pan American Open	September 12–13, 2026	(Dominican Republic) Santo Domingo
Pan American Open	October 31 – November 1, 2026	(United States) Gainesville
Pan American Open	November 7–8, 2026	(Canada) Montreal
Pan American Open	TBC, 2027	TBC
Pan American Open	TBC, 2027	TBC
2027 Pan American Judo Championships	April 8–9, 2027	(Peru) Lima

== Qualification summary ==
The following is a list of qualified countries and athletes per event. The qualification summary is as of September 14, 2026.

NOC	Men							Women							Mixed	Total
NOC	-60 kg	-66 kg	-73 kg	-81 kg	-90 kg	-100 kg	+100 kg	-48kg	-52 kg	-57 kg	-63 kg	-70 kg	-78 kg	+78 kg	Team	Total
Argentina	X	X	X	X		X	X	X	X	X	X	X		X	Yes	12
Bahamas														X		1
Brazil	X	XX	XX	XX	XX	XX	XX	XX	XX	XX	XX	X	XX	X	Yes	25
Canada		X	X	X	X		X		X	X	X	X	X	X	Yes	11
Chile	X			X		X	X	X		X						6
Colombia		X	X		X	X		X	X	X	X	X	X	X	Yes	11
Costa Rica											X					1
Cuba	X	X			X	X	X				X	X	X	XX	Yes	10
Dominican Republic	X	X	X	X	X	X	X	X	X	X	X	X	X	X	Yes	14
Ecuador	XX	X	X					X				X				6
El Salvador	X															1
Haiti												X				1
Honduras						X										1
Mexico		X	X	X	X	X		X	X	X		X	X		Yes	10
Nicaragua														X		1
Paraguay						X										1
Panama	X		X	X	X			X	X							6
Peru	X	X	X	X	X	X	X	X	X	X	X	X	X	X	Yes	14
Puerto Rico					X				X				X			3
United States	X	X	X	X	X		X	X		X	X	X	X		Yes	11
Uruguay							X			X						2
Venezuela				X			X		X		X		X	X		6
Total: 22 NOCs	11	11	11	11	11	11	11	11	11	11	11	11	11	11	9	154

== Men ==
=== 60 kg ===
Criteria	Vacancies	Qualified
Host nation	1	Peru
Junior Pan American Games	1	Jonathan Benavides (ECU)
Top 9 ranked countries	9	Cuba; Dominican Republic; El Salvador; United States; Argentina; Ecuador; Brazil; Chile; Panama
TOTAL	11	

=== 66 kg ===
Criteria	Vacancies	Qualified
Host nation	1	Peru
Junior Pan American Games	1	Bruno Nóbrega (BRA)
Top 9 ranked countries	9	Ecuador; Cuba; Mexico; Canada; Brazil; Argentina; United States; Dominican Republic; Colombia
TOTAL	11	

=== 73 kg ===
Criteria	Vacancies	Qualified
Host nation	1	Peru
Junior Pan American Games	1	Matheus Nolasco (BRA)
Top 9 ranked countries	9	Brazil; Colombia; United States; Dominican Republic; Canada; Ecuador; Argentina; Panama; Mexico
TOTAL	11	

=== 81 kg ===
Criteria	Vacancies	Qualified
Host nation	1	Peru
Junior Pan American Games	1	Luan Almeida (BRA)
Top 9 ranked countries	9	United States; Argentina; Canada; Dominican Republic; Mexico; Brazil; Panama; Chile; Venezuela
TOTAL	11	

=== 90 kg ===
Criteria	Vacancies	Qualified
Host nation	1	Peru
Junior Pan American Games	1	Jesse Barbosa (BRA)
Top 9 ranked countries	9	Dominican Republic; Canada; United States; Mexico; Brazil; Panama; Colombia; Cuba; Puerto Rico
TOTAL	11	

=== 100 kg ===
Criteria	Vacancies	Qualified
Host nation	1	Peru
Junior Pan American Games	1	Gustavo Milano (BRA)
Top 9 ranked countries	9	Argentina; Brazil; Dominican Republic; Cuba; Mexico; Chile; Colombia; Honduras; Paraguay
TOTAL	11	

=== +100 kg ===
Criteria	Vacancies	Qualified
Host nation	1	Peru
Junior Pan American Games	1	Andrey Coelho (BRA)
Top 9 ranked countries	9	Chile; United States; Dominican Republic; Uruguay; Cuba; Brazil; Venezuela; Canada; Argentina
TOTAL	11	

== Women ==
=== 48 kg ===
Criteria	Vacancies	Qualified
Host nation	1	Peru
Junior Pan American Games	1	Clarice Ribeiro (BRA)
Top 9 ranked countries	9	Ecuador; Colombia; Brazil; Panama; Chile; Dominican Republic; United States; Argentina; Mexico
TOTAL	11	

=== 52 kg ===
Criteria	Vacancies	Qualified
Host nation	1	Peru
Junior Pan American Games	1	Rafaela Rodrigues (BRA)
Top 9 ranked countries	9	Brazil; Puerto Rico; Mexico; Panama; Canada; Dominican Republic; Venezuela; Argentina; Colombia
TOTAL	11	

=== 57 kg ===
Criteria	Vacancies	Qualified
Host nation	1	Peru
Junior Pan American Games	1	Bianca Reis (BRA)
Top 9 ranked countries	9	Brazil; Dominican Republic; Argentina; Colombia; Chile; United States; Mexico; Uruguay; Canada
TOTAL	11	

=== 63 kg ===
Criteria	Vacancies	Qualified
Host nation	1	Peru
Junior Pan American Games	1	Eduarda Bastos (BRA)
Top 9 ranked countries	9	Canada; Venezuela; Brazil; Colombia; United States; Dominican Republic; Argentina; Cuba; Costa Rica
TOTAL	11	

=== 70 kg ===
Criteria	Vacancies	Qualified
Host nation	1	Peru
Junior Pan American Games	1	Heidy Santillana (COL)
Top 9 ranked countries	9	Brazil; Ecuador; Dominican Republic; Canada; United States; Argentina; Mexico; Haiti; Cuba
TOTAL	11	

=== 78 kg ===
Criteria	Vacancies	Qualified
Host nation	1	Peru
Junior Pan American Games	1	Dandara Camillo (BRA)
Top 9 ranked countries	9	Colombia; Puerto Rico; Venezuela; Brazil; Canada; Mexico; Dominican Republic; Cuba; United States
TOTAL	11	

=== +78 kg ===
Criteria	Vacancies	Qualified
Host nation	1	Peru
Junior Pan American Games	1	Dayanara Curbelo Travieso (CUB)
Top 9 ranked countries	9	Venezuela; Dominican Republic; Colombia; Bahamas; Argentina; Canada; Brazil; Cuba; Nicaragua
TOTAL	11	
