= Fencing at the 2027 Pan American Games – Qualification =

The following is the qualification system and qualified countries for the Fencing at the 2027 Pan American Games competitions.

== Qualification system ==
A total of up to 162 fencers will qualify to compete. Each nation may enter a maximum of 18 athletes (nine per gender), unless they qualified an athlete via the Asuncion 2025 Junior Pan American Games. The gold medalists in the individual events of Asuncion 2025 received a nominal place for the Lima 2027 Pan American Games. If the athletes who qualified at the Asuncion 2025 Junior Pan American Games do not participate in the Lima 2027 Pan American Games, said place will be forfeited and cannot be transferred to another NOC or athlete. The top seven teams at the 2026 Pan American Championships, along with the top two individuals not qualified through the team event will qualify for each respective discipline per gender. The host nation, Peru, automatically qualifies the maximum number of fencers (18). A maximum of two athletes from one NOC can enter the individual events. Only the winning countries in Asuncion will have the advantage of competing with 3 fencers in the individual event in case of having qualified for Lima 2027 with the team of their respective weapon.

== Qualification timeline ==
Event	Date	Venue
2025 Junior Pan American Games	August 10–12	(Paraguay) Asuncion
2026 Pan American Fencing Championships	June 15–20	(Peru) Lima

== Qualification summary ==
A total of 17 NOC's qualified fencers.

NOC	Men						Women						Total
NOC	I. épée	T. épée	I. foil	T. foil	I. sabre	T. sabre	I. épée	T. épée	I. foil	T. foil	I. sabre	T. sabre	Total
Argentina	2	X	2	X	2	X	2	X	1		2	X	16
Bolivia					1								1
Brazil	2	X	2	X	2	X	2	X	2	X	2	X	18
Canada	2	X	2	X	2	X	2	X	2	X	2	X	18
Chile	2	X	2	X	2	X	2	X	3	X	1		17
Colombia	2	X							2	X	2	X	9
Dominican Republic					1						1		2
Ecuador			1										1
El Salvador	1								1				2
Mexico			2	X	2	X	2	X	2	X	2	X	15
Panama	1						1						2
Paraguay							1						1
Peru	2	X	3	X	2	X	2	X	2	X	2	X	19
Puerto Rico			1		1						1		3
United States	2	X	2	X	2	X	2	X	2	X	2	X	18
Venezuela	2	X	2	X	2	X	3	X	2	X	2	X	19
Virgin Islands	1												1
Total: 17 NOCs	19	8	19	8	19	8	19	8	19	8	19	8	162

== Men ==
=== Épée ===
Competition	Fencers per NOC	Total	Qualified
Host nation	3	3	Peru
2025 Junior Pan American Games individual event	1	1	Taydon Kruz (ISV)
2026 Pan American Championship team event	3	21	United States; Venezuela; Brazil; Colombia; Canada; Chile; Argentina
2026 Pan American Championship individual event	1	2	El Salvador; Panama
Total		27	

=== Foil ===
Competition	Fencers per NOC	Total	Qualified
Host nation	3	3	Peru
2025 Junior Pan American Games individual event	1	1	Renzo Furukawa (PER)
2026 Pan American Championship team event	3	21	United States; Canada; Mexico; Brazil; Chile; Argentina; Venezuela
2026 Pan American Championship individual event	1	2	Ecuador; Puerto Rico
Total		27	

=== Sabre ===
Competition	Fencers per NOC	Total	Qualified
Host nation	3	3	Peru
2025 Junior Pan American Games individual event	1	1	Esteban Shepard (BOL)
2026 Pan American Championship team event	3	21	United States; Canada; Venezuela; Mexico; Brazil; Chile; Argentina
2026 Pan American Championship individual event	1	2	Puerto Rico; Dominican Republic
Total		27	

== Women ==
=== Épée ===
Competition	Fencers per NOC	Total	Qualified
Host nation	3	3	Peru
2025 Junior Pan American Games individual event	1	1	Victória Hidalgo (VEN)
2026 Pan American Championship team event	3	21	United States; Canada; Venezuela; Chile; Brazil; Argentina; Mexico
2026 Pan American Championship individual event	1	2	Paraguay; Panama
Total		27	

=== Foil ===
Competition	Fencers per NOC	Total	Qualified
Host nation	3	3	Peru
2025 Junior Pan American Games individual event	1	1	Rafaela Santibañez (CHI)
2026 Pan American Championship team event	3	21	United States; Canada; Brazil; Chile; Mexico; Venezuela; Colombia
2026 Pan American Championship individual event	1	2	Argentina; El Salvador
Total		27	

=== Sabre ===
Competition	Fencers per NOC	Total	Qualified
Host nation	3	3	Peru
2025 Junior Pan American Games individual event	1	1	Gabriela Hwang (PUR)
2026 Pan American Championship team event	3	21	United States; Argentina; Mexico; Canada; Brazil; Colombia; Venezuela
2026 Pan American Championship individual event	1	2	Dominican Republic; Chile
Total		27	
