= Athletics at the 2027 Pan American Games – Qualification =

The following is the qualification system for the Athletics at the 2027 Pan American Games competition.

== Qualification system ==
A total of 776 athletes will qualify to compete. Each nation may enter a maximum of two athletes in each individual event, and one team per relay event. Each event has a maximum number of competitors and a minimum performance standard. Peru as host nation, is granted an automatic athlete slot per event, in the event no one qualifies for that respective event.

The winner of each individual event (plus top two relay teams per event), from five regional qualification tournaments automatically qualified with the standard (even if not reached). If an event quota is not filled, athletes will be invited till the maximum number per event is reached.

For relays, each country can enter two relay only competitors to participate. The other members of each relay team must be registered in an individual event.

Qualifying standards must be achieved between 1 January 2027 and 17 May 2027.

== Qualification timeline ==
Events	Date	Venue
2025 Junior Pan American Games	19–21 August 2022	Asuncion, Paraguay
2026 Pan American Athletics Championships	26–28 June 2026	Medellín, Colombia
2026 Central American and Caribbean Games	July 24 – August 8, 2023	San Salvador, El Salvador
2026 South American Games	12–26 September 2026	Santa Fe, Argentina
2027 NACAC Championships	TBD	TBD
2027 South American Senior Athletics Championship	TBD	TBD

== Track events ==
=== Men's track events ===
==== Men's 100 m ====
Does not include indoor achievements or races with wind above 2.0 m/s. Entry number: 24 athletes

Qualification standard	No. of athletes	Qualified athlete
2025 Junior Pan American Games	1	Davonte Howell (CAY)
2026 Pan American Athletics Championships	1	Ronal Longa (COL)
2026 Central American and Caribbean Games	0	–
2026 South American Games	0	–
2027 NACAC Senior Athletics Championship	1	
2027 South American Senior Athletics Championship	1	
Pan American Area Ranking	20	
Total	24	

==== Men's 200 m ====
Entry number: 24 athletes

Qualification standard	No. of athletes	Qualified athlete
2025 Junior Pan American Games	1	José Figueroa (PUR)
2026 Pan American Athletics Championships	0	–
2026 Central American and Caribbean Games	0	–
2026 South American Games	1	Ronal Longa (COL)
2027 NACAC Senior Athletics Championship	1	
2027 South American Senior Athletics Championship	1	
Pan American Area Ranking	20	
Total	24	

==== Men's 400 m ====
Entry number: 18 athletes

Qualification standard	No. of athletes	Qualified athlete
2025 Junior Pan American Games	1	Jasauna Dennis (JAM)
2026 Pan American Athletics Championships	1	Gabriel Moronta (DOM)
2026 Central American and Caribbean Games	0	–
2026 South American Games	1	Alison dos Santos (BRA)
2027 NACAC Senior Athletics Championship	1	
2027 South American Senior Athletics Championship	1	
Pan American Area Ranking	17	
Total	22	

==== Men's 800 m ====
Entry number: 20 athletes

Qualification standard	No. of athletes	Qualified athlete
2025 Junior Pan American Games	1	Miguel Pantojas (PUR)
2026 Pan American Athletics Championships	1	Eduardo Moreira (BRA)
2026 Central American and Caribbean Games	1	Ferdy Agramonte (DOM)
2026 South American Games	1	Chamar Chambers (PAN)
2027 NACAC Senior Athletics Championship	1	
2027 South American Senior Athletics Championship	1	
Pan American Area Ranking	14	
Total	20	

==== Men's 1500 m ====
Entry number: 13 athletes

Qualification standard	No. of athletes	Qualified athlete
2025 Junior Pan American Games	1	Jude Wheeler-Dee (CAN)
2026 Pan American Athletics Championships	1	Foster Malleck (CAN)
2026 Central American and Caribbean Games	1	Eduardo Herrera (MEX)
2026 South American Games	1	Valentín Soca (URU)
2027 NACAC Senior Athletics Championship	1	
2027 South American Senior Athletics Championship	1	
Pan American Area Ranking	7	
Total	13	

==== Men's 5000 m ====
Entry number: 13 athletes

Qualification standard	No. of athletes	Qualified athlete
2025 Junior Pan American Games	1	Pedro Marín (COL)
2026 Pan American Athletics Championships	1	Matías Reynaga (ARG)
2026 Central American and Caribbean Games	1	Eduardo Herrera (MEX)
2026 South American Games	1	Valentín Soca (URU)
2027 NACAC Senior Athletics Championship	1	
2027 South American Senior Athletics Championship	1	
Pan American Area Ranking	7	
Total	13	

==== Men's 10,000 m ====
Entry number: 13 athletes

Qualification standard	No. of athletes	Qualified athlete
2025 Junior Pan American Games	1	Pedro Marín (COL)
2026 Pan American Athletics Championships	1	Luis Masabanda (ECU)
2026 Central American and Caribbean Games	1	José Luis Santana (MEX)
2026 South American Games	1	Santiago Catrofe (URU)
2027 NACAC Senior Athletics Championship	1	
2027 South American Senior Athletics Championship	1	
Pan American Area Ranking	7	
Total	13	

==== Men's 110 m hurdles ====
Entry number: 18 athletes

Qualification standard	No. of athletes	Qualified athlete
2025 Junior Pan American Games	1	Yander Herrera (CUB)
2026 Pan American Athletics Championships	1	Marcos Herrera (ECU)
2026 Central American and Caribbean Games	0	–
2026 South American Games	1	Rafael Pereira (BRA)
2027 NACAC Senior Athletics Championship	1	
2027 South American Senior Athletics Championship	1	
Pan American Area Ranking	13	
Total	18	

==== Men's 400 m hurdles ====
Entry number: 18 athletes

Qualification standard	No. of athletes	Qualified athlete
2025 Junior Pan American Games	1	Tyreece Hyman (JAM)
2026 Pan American Athletics Championships	1	Yeral Núñez (DOM)
2026 Central American and Caribbean Games	0	–
2026 South American Games	1	Matheus Lima (BRA)
2027 NACAC Senior Athletics Championship	1	
2027 South American Senior Athletics Championship	1	
Pan American Area Ranking	13	
Total	18	

==== Men's 3000 m steeplechase ====
Entry number: 13 athletes

Qualification standard	No. of athletes	Qualified athlete
2025 Junior Pan American Games	1	Oleisy Ferrer (CUB)
2026 Pan American Athletics Championships	1	César Gómez (MEX)
2026 Central American and Caribbean Games	1	Diddier Rodríguez (PAN)
2026 South American Games	0	–
2027 NACAC Senior Athletics Championship	1	
2027 South American Senior Athletics Championship	1	
Pan American Area Ranking	8	
Total	13	

=== Women's track events ===
==== Women's 100 m ====
Entry number: 24 athletes

Qualification standard	No. of athletes	Qualified athlete
2025 Junior Pan American Games	1	Shaniqua Bascombe (TTO)
2026 Pan American Athletics Championships	1	Sade McCreath (CAN)
2026 Central American and Caribbean Games	1	Liranyi Alonso (DOM)
2026 South American Games	1	Orangys Jiménez (VEN)
2027 NACAC Senior Athletics Championship	1	
2027 South American Senior Athletics Championship	1	
Pan American Area Ranking	18	
Total	24	

==== Women's 200 m ====
Entry number: 24 athletes

Qualification standard	No. of athletes	Qualified athlete
2025 Junior Pan American Games	1	Liranyi Alonso (DOM)
2026 Pan American Athletics Championships	1	Audrey Leduc (CAN)
2026 Central American and Caribbean Games	0	–
2026 South American Games	1	Orangys Jiménez (VEN)
2027 NACAC Senior Athletics Championship	1	
2027 South American Senior Athletics Championship	1	
Pan American Area Ranking	19	
Total	24	

==== Women's 400 m ====
Entry number: 22 athletes

Qualification standard	No. of athletes	Qualified athlete
2025 Junior Pan American Games	1	Dianna Proctor (CAN)
2026 Pan American Athletics Championships	1	Lauren Gale (CAN)
2026 Central American and Caribbean Games	1	Marileidy Paulino (DOM)
2026 South American Games	1	Martina Weil (CHI)
2027 NACAC Senior Athletics Championship	1	
2027 South American Senior Athletics Championship	1	
Pan American Area Ranking	16	
Total	22	

==== Women's 800 m ====
Entry number: 20 athletes

Qualification standard	No. of athletes	Qualified athlete
2025 Junior Pan American Games	1	Sabrina Pena (BRA)
2026 Pan American Athletics Championships	1	Daily Cooper Gaspar (CUB)
2026 Central American and Caribbean Games	0	–
2026 South American Games	1	Valentina Barrientos (CHI)
2027 NACAC Senior Athletics Championship	1	
2027 South American Senior Athletics Championship	1	
Pan American Area Ranking	15	
Total	20	

==== Women's 1500 m ====
Entry number: 13 athletes

Qualification standard	No. of athletes	Qualified athlete
2025 Junior Pan American Games	1	Dafne Juárez (MEX)
2026 Pan American Athletics Championships	1	Daily Cooper Gaspar (CUB)
2026 Central American and Caribbean Games	0	–
2026 South American Games	1	Micaela Levaggi (ARG)
2027 NACAC Senior Athletics Championship	1	
2027 South American Senior Athletics Championship	1	
Pan American Area Ranking	8	
Total	13	

==== Women's 5000 m ====
Entry number: 13 athletes

Qualification standard	No. of athletes	Qualified athlete
2025 Junior Pan American Games	1	Dafne Juárez (MEX)
2026 Pan American Athletics Championships	1	Anisleidis Ochoa (CUB)
2026 Central American and Caribbean Games	0	–
2026 South American Games	1	Micaela Levaggi (ARG)
2027 NACAC Senior Athletics Championship	1	
2027 South American Senior Athletics Championship	1	
Pan American Area Ranking	7	
Total	13	

==== Women's 10,000 m ====
Entry number: 13 athletes

Qualification standard	No. of athletes	Qualified athlete
2025 Junior Pan American Games	1	Jadyn Keeler (CAN)
2026 Pan American Athletics Championships	1	Viviana Aroche (GUA)
2026 Central American and Caribbean Games	1	Laura Galván (MEX)
2026 South American Games	1	Mary Granja (ECU)
2027 NACAC Senior Athletics Championship	1	
2027 South American Senior Athletics Championship	1	
Pan American Area Ranking	7	
Total	13	

==== Women's 100 m hurdles ====
Does not include indoor achievements

Entry number: 18 athletes

Qualification standard	No. of athletes	Qualified athlete
2025 Junior Pan American Games	1	Jocelyn Echazábal (CUB)
2026 Pan American Athletics Championships	1	Vitória Sena (BRA)
2026 Central American and Caribbean Games	1	María Fernanda Murillo (COL)
2026 South American Games	0	–
2027 NACAC Senior Athletics Championship	1	
2027 South American Senior Athletics Championship	1	
Pan American Area Ranking	13	
Total	18	

==== Women's 400 m hurdles ====
Entry number: 18 athletes

Qualification standard	No. of athletes	Qualified athlete
2025 Junior Pan American Games	1	Antonia Sánchez (MEX)
2026 Pan American Athletics Championships	1	Michelle Smith (ISV)
2026 Central American and Caribbean Games	1	Gianna Woodruff (PAN)
2026 South American Games	0	–
2027 NACAC Senior Athletics Championship	1	
2027 South American Senior Athletics Championship	1	
Pan American Area Ranking	13	
Total	18	

==== Women's 3000 m steeplechase ====
Entry number: 13 athletes

Qualification standard	No. of athletes	Qualified athlete
2025 Junior Pan American Games	1	Verónica Huacasi (PER)
2026 Pan American Athletics Championships	1	Micaela Levaggi (ARG)
2026 Central American and Caribbean Games	1	Anisleidis Ochoa (CUB)
2026 South American Games	1	Belén Casetta (ARG)
2027 NACAC Senior Athletics Championship	1	
2027 South American Senior Athletics Championship	1	
Pan American Area Ranking	7	
Total	13	

== Road events ==
=== Men's road events ===
==== Men's marathon ====
Entry number: 18 athletes

Qualification standard	No. of athletes	Qualified athlete
2026 Pan American Athletics Championships	0	–
2026 Central American and Caribbean Games	0	–
2026 South American Games	0	–
2027 NACAC Senior Athletics Championship	1	
2027 South American Senior Athletics Championship	1	
Pan American Area Ranking	16	
Total	18	

==== Men's half marathon walk ====
Entry number: 16 athletes

Qualification standard	No. of athletes	Qualified athlete
2025 Junior Pan American Games	1	Miguel Peña (COL)
2026 Pan American Athletics Championships	1	Iván Oña (ECU)
2026 Central American and Caribbean Games	1	Ricardo Ortíz (MEX)
2026 South American Games	1	Caio Bonfim (BRA)
2027 NACAC Senior Athletics Championship	1	
2027 South American Senior Athletics Championship	1	
Pan American Area Ranking	10	
Total	16	

=== Women's road events ===
==== Women's marathon ====
Entry number: 18 athletes

Qualification standard	No. of athletes	Qualified athlete
2026 Pan American Athletics Championships	0	–
2026 Central American and Caribbean Games	0	–
2026 South American Games	0	–
2027 NACAC Senior Athletics Championship	1	
2027 South American Senior Athletics Championship	1	
Pan American Area Ranking	16	
Total	18	

==== Women's half marathon walk ====
Entry number: 16 athletes

Qualification standard	No. of athletes	Qualified athlete
2025 Junior Pan American Games	1	Karla Serrano (MEX)
2026 Pan American Athletics Championships	1	Evelyn Inga (PER)
2026 Central American and Caribbean Games	1	Alegna González (MEX)
2026 South American Games	0	–
2027 NACAC Senior Athletics Championship	1	
2027 South American Senior Athletics Championship	1	
Pan American Area Ranking	11	
Total	16	

== Field events ==
=== Men's field events ===
==== Men's high jump ====
Entry number: 12 athletes

Qualification standard	No. of athletes	Qualified athlete
2025 Junior Pan American Games	1	Diosber Hernández (CUB)
2026 Pan American Athletics Championships	1	Jair Portillo (MEX)
2026 Central American and Caribbean Games	1	Erick Portillo (MEX)
2026 South American Games	1	Fernando Ferreira (BRA)
2027 NACAC Senior Athletics Championship	1	
2027 South American Senior Athletics Championship	1	
Pan American Area Ranking	6	
Total	12	

==== Men's pole vault ====
Entry number: 12 athletes

Qualification standard	No. of athletes	Qualified athlete
2025 Junior Pan American Games	1	Ricardo Montes (VEN)
2026 Pan American Athletics Championships	1	Austin Miller (USA)
2026 Central American and Caribbean Games	0	–
2026 South American Games	1	Augusto Dutra (BRA)
2027 NACAC Senior Athletics Championship	1	
2027 South American Senior Athletics Championship	1	
Pan American Area Ranking	7	
Total	12	

==== Men's long jump ====
Entry number: 12 athletes

Qualification standard	No. of athletes	Qualified athlete
2025 Junior Pan American Games	1	Aniel Gómez (CUB)
2026 Pan American Athletics Championships	1	Emiliano Lasa (URU)
2026 Central American and Caribbean Games	1	Jorge A. Hodelín (CUB)
2026 South American Games	1	Arnovis Dalmero (COL)
2027 NACAC Senior Athletics Championship	1	
2027 South American Senior Athletics Championship	1	
Pan American Area Ranking	6	
Total	12	

==== Men's triple jump ====
Entry number: 12 athletes

Qualification standard	No. of athletes	Qualified athlete
2025 Junior Pan American Games	1	Praise Aniamaka (CAN)
2026 Pan American Athletics Championships	1	Almir dos Santos (BRA)
2026 Central American and Caribbean Games	1	Lázaro Martínez (CUB)
2026 South American Games	1	Elton Petronilho (BRA)
2027 NACAC Senior Athletics Championship	1	
2027 South American Senior Athletics Championship	1	
Pan American Area Ranking	6	
Total	12	

==== Men's shot put ====
Entry number: 12 athletes

Qualification standard	No. of athletes	Qualified athlete
2025 Junior Pan American Games	1	Juan Manuel Arrieguez (ARG)
2026 Pan American Athletics Championships	1	Willian Dourado (BRA)
2026 Central American and Caribbean Games	1	Uziel Muñoz (MEX)
2026 South American Games	0	–
2027 NACAC Senior Athletics Championship	1	
2027 South American Senior Athletics Championship	1	
Pan American Area Ranking	7	
Total	12	

==== Men's discus throw ====
Entry number: 12 athletes

Qualification standard	No. of athletes	Qualified athlete
2025 Junior Pan American Games	1	Racquil Broaderick (JAM)
2026 Pan American Athletics Championships	1	Claudio Romero (CHI)
2026 Central American and Caribbean Games	1	Chad Wright (JAM)
2026 South American Games	0	–
2027 NACAC Senior Athletics Championship	1	
2027 South American Senior Athletics Championship	1	
Pan American Area Ranking	7	
Total	12	

==== Men's hammer throw ====
Entry number: 12 athletes

Qualification standard	No. of athletes	Qualified athlete
2025 Junior Pan American Games	1	Tomás Olivera (ARG)
2026 Pan American Athletics Championships	1	Humberto Mansilla (CHI)
2026 Central American and Caribbean Games	1	Ronald Mencía (CUB)
2026 South American Games	0	–
2027 NACAC Senior Athletics Championship	1	
2027 South American Senior Athletics Championship	1	
Pan American Area Ranking	7	
Total	12	

==== Men's javelin throw ====
Entry number: 12 athletes

Qualification standard	No. of athletes	Qualified athlete
2025 Junior Pan American Games	1	Lars Flaming (PAR)
2026 Pan American Athletics Championships	0	–
2026 Central American and Caribbean Games	1	Anderson Peters (GRN)
2026 South American Games	0	–
2027 NACAC Senior Athletics Championship	1	
2027 South American Senior Athletics Championship	1	
Pan American Area Ranking	8	
Total	12	

=== Women's field events ===
==== Women's high jump ====
Entry number: 12 athletes

Qualification standard	No. of athletes	Qualified athlete
2025 Junior Pan American Games	1	Isabel Arboleda (COL)
2026 Pan American Athletics Championships	1	Marysabel Senyu (DOM)
2026 Central American and Caribbean Games	0	–
2026 South American Games	1	Glenka Antonia (ARU)
2027 NACAC Senior Athletics Championship	1	
2027 South American Senior Athletics Championship	1	
Pan American Area Ranking	7	
Total	12	

==== Women's pole vault ====
Entry number: 12 athletes

Qualification standard	No. of athletes	Qualified athlete
2025 Junior Pan American Games	1	Jennifer Elizarov (CAN)
2026 Pan American Athletics Championships	1	Juliana Campos (BRA)
2026 Central American and Caribbean Games	1	Aslin Quiala (CUB)
2026 South American Games	0	–
2027 NACAC Senior Athletics Championship	1	
2027 South American Senior Athletics Championship	1	
Pan American Area Ranking	7	
Total	12	

==== Women's long jump ====
Entry number: 12 athletes

Qualification standard	No. of athletes	Qualified athlete
2025 Junior Pan American Games	1	Natalia Linares (COL)
2026 Pan American Athletics Championships	1	Alysbeth Félix (PUR)
2026 Central American and Caribbean Games	0	–
2026 South American Games	1	Nathalee Aranda (PAN)
2027 NACAC Senior Athletics Championship	1	
2027 South American Senior Athletics Championship	1	
Pan American Area Ranking	7	
Total	12	

==== Women's triple jump ====
Entry number: 12 athletes

Qualification standard	No. of athletes	Qualified athlete
2025 Junior Pan American Games	1	Lidsay González (CUB)
2026 Pan American Athletics Championships	1	Gabriele dos Santos (BRA)
2026 Central American and Caribbean Games	1	Leyanis Pérez (CUB)
2026 South American Games	0	–
2027 NACAC Senior Athletics Championship	1	
2027 South American Senior Athletics Championship	1	
Pan American Area Ranking	7	
Total	12	

==== Women's shot put ====
Entry number: 12 athletes

Qualification standard	No. of athletes	Qualified athlete
2025 Junior Pan American Games	1	Treneese Hamilton (DMA)
2026 Pan American Athletics Championships	1	Dianelis Delís (CUB)
2026 Central American and Caribbean Games	1	Rosa Ramírez (DOM)
2026 South American Games	0	–
2027 NACAC Senior Athletics Championship	1	
2027 South American Senior Athletics Championship	1	
Pan American Area Ranking	7	
Total	12	

==== Women's discus throw ====
Entry number: 12 athletes

Qualification standard	No. of athletes	Qualified athlete
2025 Junior Pan American Games	1	Alejandra Mesa (CUB)
2026 Pan American Athletics Championships	1	Andressa de Morais (BRA)
2026 Central American and Caribbean Games	1	Silinda Morales (CUB)
2026 South American Games	0	–
2027 NACAC Senior Athletics Championship	1	
2027 South American Senior Athletics Championship	1	
Pan American Area Ranking	7	
Total	12	

==== Women's hammer throw ====
Entry number: 12 athletes

Qualification standard	No. of athletes	Qualified athlete
2025 Junior Pan American Games	1	Yarielis Torres (PUR)
2026 Pan American Athletics Championships	1	Jillian Weir (CAN)
2026 Central American and Caribbean Games	1	Mayra Gaviria (COL)
2026 South American Games	0	–
2027 NACAC Senior Athletics Championship	1	
2027 South American Senior Athletics Championship	1	
Pan American Area Ranking	7	
Total	12	

==== Women's javelin throw ====
Entry number: 12 athletes

Qualification standard	No. of athletes	Qualified athlete
2025 Junior Pan American Games	1	Valentina Barrios (COL)
2026 Pan American Athletics Championships	0	–
2026 Central American and Caribbean Games	1	Flor Ruiz (COL)
2026 South American Games	0	–
2027 NACAC Senior Athletics Championship	1	
2027 South American Senior Athletics Championship	1	
Pan American Area Ranking	8	
Total	12	

== Combined events ==
=== Men's decathlon ===
Entry number: 12 athletes

Qualification standard	No. of athletes	Qualified athlete
2025 Junior Pan American Games	1	Josmi Sánchez (CUB)
2026 Pan American Athletics Championships	0	–
2026 Central American and Caribbean Games	1	Yariel Soto (PUR)
2026 South American Games	1	José Fernando Ferreira (BRA)
2027 NACAC Senior Athletics Championship	1	
2027 South American Senior Athletics Championship	1	
Pan American Area Ranking	7	
Total	12	

=== Women's heptathlon ===
Entry number: 12 athletes

Qualification standard	No. of athletes	Qualified athlete
2025 Junior Pan American Games	1	Isabella Goudros (CAN)
2026 Pan American Athletics Championships	1	María Fernanda Murillo (COL)
2026 Central American and Caribbean Games	1	Alysbeth Félix (PUR)
2026 South American Games	1	Paloma Cardoso (BRA)
2027 NACAC Senior Athletics Championship	1	
2027 South American Senior Athletics Championship	1	
Pan American Area Ranking	6	
Total	12	

== Relay events ==
Each invited NOC will be able to enter a maximum of 2 (two) competitors to participate only in each relay race. For the mixed 4 × 400 m relay they must enter 1 woman and 1 man. The other 4 (four) members of each relay team with a maximum of 6 (six) athletes (4 × 100 m, 4 × 400 m and mixed 4 × 400 m) should be entered in an individual event.

=== Men's 4 × 100 m relay ===
Entry number: 12 teams

Qualification standard	No. of teams	Qualified teams
2026 Pan American Athletics Championships	1	Dominican Republic
2026 Central American and Caribbean Games	0	–
2026 South American Games	1	Colombia
2027 NACAC Senior Athletics Championship	1	
2027 South American Senior Athletics Championship	1	
Pan American Area Ranking	8	
Total	12	

=== Men's 4 × 400 m relay ===
Entry number: 12 teams

Qualification standard	No. of teams	Qualified teams
2026 Pan American Athletics Championships	1	Dominican Republic
2026 Central American and Caribbean Games	1	Puerto Rico
2026 South American Games	1	Venezuela
2027 NACAC Senior Athletics Championship	1	
2027 South American Senior Athletics Championship	1	
Pan American Area Ranking	7	
Total	12	

=== Women's 4 × 100 m relay ===
Entry number: 12 teams

Qualification standard	No. of teams	Qualified teams
2026 Pan American Athletics Championships	1	Dominican Republic
2026 Central American and Caribbean Games	0	–
2026 South American Games	1	Colombia
2027 NACAC Senior Athletics Championship	1	
2027 South American Senior Athletics Championship	1	
Pan American Area Ranking	8	
Total	12	

=== Women's 4 × 400 m relay ===
Entry number: 12 teams

Qualification standard	No. of teams	Qualified teams
2026 Pan American Athletics Championships	1	Colombia
2026 Central American and Caribbean Games	1	Dominican Republic
2026 South American Games	0	–
2027 NACAC Senior Athletics Championship	1	
2027 South American Senior Athletics Championship	1	
Pan American Area Ranking	8	
Total	12	

=== Mixed 4 × 100 m relay ===
Entry number: 8 teams

Qualification standard	No. of teams	Qualified teams
2026 Pan American Athletics Championships	1	Dominican Republic
2026 Central American and Caribbean Games	0	–
2026 South American Games	1	Venezuela
2027 NACAC Senior Athletics Championship	1	
2027 South American Senior Athletics Championship	1	
Pan American Area Ranking	4	
Total	8	

=== Mixed 4 × 400 m relay ===
Entry number: 8 teams

Qualification standard	No. of teams	Qualified teams
2026 Pan American Athletics Championships	1	Dominican Republic
2026 Central American and Caribbean Games	0	–
2026 South American Games	1	Argentina
2027 NACAC Senior Athletics Championship	1	
2027 South American Senior Athletics Championship	1	
Pan American Area Ranking	4	
Total	8	
