= Equestrian at the 2027 Pan American Games – Qualification =

The following is the qualification system and list of qualified nations for the Equestrian at the 2027 Pan American Games competition.

== Qualification system ==
A quota of 150 equestrian riders (44 dressage, 46 eventing and 60 show jumping) will be allowed to qualify. A maximum of 12 athletes can compete for a nation across all events (with a maximum of four per discipline). Athletes qualified through various qualifying events and rankings.

If a country does not qualify a team in equestrian, it may enter a maximum of two individuals per discipline. A team can be made up of three of four athletes, meaning if reallocation does occur, countries with individuals can qualify teams, respecting the maximum number of teams allowed to compete in each discipline.

== Qualification summary ==
A total of 17 NOC's qualified equestrians.

Nation	Individual			Team			Total
Nation	Dressage	Eventing	Jumping	Dressage	Eventing	Jumping	Total
Argentina	2	4	4		X	X	10
Bahamas			1				1
Bolivia			1				1
Brazil	4	4	4	X	X	X	12
Chile	1	4	4		X	X	9
Colombia	4	4	4	X	X	X	12
Costa Rica	4		1	X			5
Dominican Republic	2	2	1				5
Ecuador	4			X			4
Guatemala	2	4	4		X	X	10
Honduras		4			X		4
Mexico	4	4	4	X	X	X	12
Panama	1		1				2
Paraguay			2				2
Peru	4	4	4	X	X	X	12
Uruguay		1	1				2
Venezuela			4			X	4
Total: 17 NOCs	44	46	60	8	10	12	150

== Qualification timeline ==
Events	Date	Venue
2026 Central American and Caribbean Games	July 24–August 8, 2026	(Dominican Republic) Santo Domingo
2026 South American Games	September 12–26, 2026	(Argentina) Rosario
FEI Dressage/Eventing rankings	March 2027	—N/a
FEI Jumping rankings	March 2027	—N/a

== Dressage ==
A total of eight teams of 4 (or 3) athletes each will qualify, along with 12 individuals who will qualify for a total of 44 athletes.

=== Team ===
Event	Vacancies	Qualified
Host Nation	1	Peru
2026 Central American and Caribbean Games	3	Mexico; Colombia; Costa Rica
2026 South American Games	2	Ecuador; Brazil
FEI World Dressage Rankings (North America)	2	
TOTAL	8	

=== Individual ===
Event	Vacancies	Qualified
2026 Central American and Caribbean Games	5	Panama; Dominican Republic; Guatemala; Guatemala; Dominican Republic
2026 South American Games	3	Argentina; Argentina; Chile
FEI World Dressage Rankings	4	
TOTAL	12	

== Eventing ==
A total of ten teams of 4 (or 3) athletes each will qualify, along with 6 individuals will qualify for a total of 46 athletes.

=== Team ===
Event	Vacancies	Qualified
Host Nation	1	Peru
2026 Central American and Caribbean Games	4	Mexico; Colombia; Honduras; Guatemala
2026 South American Games	3	Brazil; Argentina; Chile
FEI World Eventing Rankings (North America)	2	
TOTAL	10	

=== Individual ===
Event	Vacancies	Qualified
2026 Central American and Caribbean Games	2	Dominican Republic; Dominican Republic
2026 South American Games	~~2~~ 1	Uruguay
FEI World Eventing Ranking	~~2~~ 3	
TOTAL	6	

== Jumping ==
A total of 12 teams of 4 (or 3) athletes each will qualify, along with 12 individuals will qualify for a total of 60 athletes.

=== Team ===
Event	Vacancies	Qualified
Host Nation	1	Peru
2026 Central American and Caribbean Games	4	Colombia; Mexico; Venezuela; Guatemala
2026 South American Games	3	Brazil; Argentina; Chile
FEI Jumping Pan American Ranking (Group IV)	2	
FEI Jumping Pan American Ranking (Countries of the CAC Games)	1	
FEI Jumping Pan American Ranking (Countries of the ODESUR Games)	1	
TOTAL	12	

=== Individual ===
Event	Vacancies	Qualified
2026 Central American and Caribbean Games	4	Panama; Dominican Republic; Costa Rica; Bahamas
2026 South American Games	4	Uruguay; Bolivia; Paraguay; Paraguay
FEI Jumping Pan American Ranking	4	
TOTAL	12	
