= Boxing at the 2027 Pan American Games – Qualification =

The following is the qualification system and qualified athletes for the boxing at the 2027 Pan American Games competitions.

== Qualification system ==
A total of 112 boxers will qualify to compete at the games (eight per event). The host nation (Peru) received automatic qualification spots. The remainder of the spots were awarded through two qualifying tournaments.

== Qualification timeline ==
Event	Date	Venue
2026 Boxing Pan American Championship	October 17–25, 2026	(Mexico) Puebla
2027 Boxing Pan American Championship	TBC	TBC

== Qualification summary ==
The following is a summary of qualified countries per event.

NOC	Men							Women							Total
NOC	55 kg	60 kg	65 kg	70 kg	80 kg	90 kg	+90 kg	51 kg	54 kg	57 kg	60 kg	65 kg	70 kg	75 kg	Total
Argentina		X								X		X			3
Brazil	X		X		X	X	X	X	X	X	X	X	X	X	12
Canada			X		X	X			X			X		X	6
Colombia				X		X	X				X		X	X	6
Cuba		X	X	X		X							X		5
Dominican Republic	X	X		X	X							X			5
Ecuador				X	X		X								3
Mexico								X							1
Peru	X	X	X	X	X	X	X	X	X	X	X	X	X	X	14
Puerto Rico	X														1
Trinidad and Tobago											X				1
United States	X	X					X	X	X	X	X		X		8
Venezuela			X					X	X	X				X	5
Total: 13 NOCs	8	8	8	8	8	8	8	8	8	8	8	8	8	8	112

== Men ==
=== 55 kg ===
Competition	Vacancies	Qualified
Host nation	1	Peru
2026 Pan American Championship	4	Brazil; Dominican Republic; Puerto Rico; United States
2027 Pan American Championship	3	
TOTAL	8	

=== 60 kg ===
Competition	Vacancies	Qualified
Host nation	1	Peru
2026 Pan American Championship	4	Argentina; Cuba; Dominican Republic; United States
2027 Pan American Championship	3	
TOTAL	8	

=== 65 kg ===
Competition	Vacancies	Qualified
Host nation	1	Peru
2026 Pan American Championship	4	Brazil; Canada; Cuba; Venezuela
2027 Pan American Championship	3	
TOTAL	8	

=== 70 kg ===
Competition	Vacancies	Qualified
Host nation	1	Peru
2026 Pan American Championship	4	Colombia; Cuba; Dominican Republic; Ecuador
2027 Pan American Championship	3	
TOTAL	8	

=== 80 kg ===
Competition	Vacancies	Qualified
Host nation	1	Peru
2026 Pan American Championship	4	Brazil; Canada; Dominican Republic; Ecuador
2027 Pan American Championship	3	
TOTAL	8	

=== 90 kg ===
Competition	Vacancies	Qualified
Host nation	1	Peru
2026 Pan American Championship	4	Brazil; Canada; Colombia; Cuba
2027 Pan American Championship	3	
TOTAL	8	

=== +90 kg ===
Competition	Vacancies	Qualified
Host nation	1	Peru
2026 Pan American Championship	4	Brazil; Colombia; Ecuador; United States
2027 Pan American Championship	3	
TOTAL	8	

== Women ==
=== 51 kg ===
Competition	Vacancies	Qualified
Host nation	1	Peru
2026 Pan American Championship	4	Brazil; Mexico; United States; Venezuela
2027 Pan American Championship	3	
TOTAL	8	

=== 54 kg ===
Competition	Vacancies	Qualified
Host nation	1	Peru
2026 Pan American Championship	4	Brazil; Canada; United States; Venezuela
2027 Pan American Championship	3	
TOTAL	8	

=== 57 kg ===
Competition	Vacancies	Qualified
Host nation	1	Peru
2026 Pan American Championship	4	Argentina; Brazil; United States; Venezuela
2027 Pan American Championship	3	
TOTAL	8	

=== 60 kg ===
Competition	Vacancies	Qualified
Host nation	1	Peru
2026 Pan American Championship	4	Brazil; Colombia; Trinidad and Tobago; United States
2027 Pan American Championship	3	
TOTAL	8	

=== 65 kg ===
Competition	Vacancies	Qualified
Host nation	1	Peru
2026 Pan American Championship	4	Argentina; Brazil; Canada; Dominican Republic
2027 Pan American Championship	3	
TOTAL	8	

=== 70 kg ===
Competition	Vacancies	Qualified
Host nation	1	Peru
2026 Pan American Championship	4	Brazil; Colombia; Cuba; United States
2027 Pan American Championship	3	
TOTAL	8	

=== 75 kg ===
Competition	Vacancies	Qualified
Host nation	1	Peru
2026 Pan American Championship	4	Brazil; Canada; Colombia; Venezuela
2027 Pan American Championship	3	
TOTAL	8	
