= Bowling at the 2027 Pan American Games – Qualification =

The following is the qualification system and qualified countries for the Bowling at the 2027 Pan American Games competitions.

== Qualification system ==
A total of 48 bowlers will qualify to compete. Each nation may enter a maximum of 4 athletes (two per gender). In each gender there will be a total of 12 pairs qualified, with one spot per event (so a total of four bowlers) reserved for the host nation Peru. There will be a total of two qualification events (2026 Central American and Caribbean Games and 2026 South American Games), each one awarding three (3) spots per gender.The remaining five (5) qualification spots for Lima 2027 will be determined via the confederation ranking, which began with the 2024 Elite Pan American Championship and includes two "Champion of Champions" events—one held in 2024 and another scheduled for 2026—as well as the Pan American Championships (Women’s, also in 2026; and Men’s, slated for the first half of 2027).

== Qualification timeline ==
Events	Date	Venue
2026 Central American and Caribbean Games	July 27–31, 2026	(Dominican Republic) Santo Domingo
2026 South American Games	September 16–19, 2026	(Argentina) Santa Fe
Pan American Ranking	April 15, 2027	—N/a

== Qualification summary ==
A total of 10 countries qualified bowlers. The qualification summary is as of October 19, 2026.

Nation	Men		Women		Total
Nation	Individual	Doubles	Individual	Doubles	Bowlers
Aruba			2	X	2
Brazil	2	X			2
Colombia			2	X	2
Dominican Republic	2	X			2
Guatemala			2	X	2
Mexico	2	X	2	X	4
Panama	2	X			2
Peru	2	X	2	X	4
Puerto Rico	2	X	2	X	4
Venezuela	2	X	2	X	4
Total: 10 NOCs	24	12	24	12	48

== Men ==
Event	Quotas	Qualified	Total bowlers
Host nation	1	Peru	2
Central American and Caribbean Games	3	Puerto Rico; Mexico; Dominican Republic	6
South American Games	3	Brazil; Panama; Venezuela	6
Pan American Ranking	5		10
TOTAL	12		24

== Women ==
Event	Quotas	Qualified	Total bowlers
Host nation	1	Peru	2
Central American and Caribbean Games	3	Mexico; Guatemala; Puerto Rico	6
South American Games	3	Colombia; Aruba; Venezuela	6
Pan American Ranking	5		10
TOTAL	12		24
