= Julio Mendoza Loor =

Ecuadorean dressage rider

Julio Mendoza
Personal information
- Full name: Julio Cesar Mendoza Loor
- Born: 8 April 1979 (age 47) Quito, Ecuador
- Website: www.mendozadressage.com

Sport
- Sport: Equestrian
- Event: Dressage
- Club: Mendoza Dressage

Achievements and titles
- World finals: 2018 World Equestrian Games
Medal record
Equestrian
Representing Ecuador
Pan American Games
Gold medal – first place	2023 Santiago	Individual dressage
South American Games
Gold medal – first place	2026 Santa Fe	Individual dressage
Gold medal – first place	2026 Santa Fe	Team dressage
Bolivarian Games
Gold medal – first place	2017 Santa Marta	Individual dressage
Gold medal – first place	2017 Santa Marta	Team dressage
Gold medal – first place	2022 Valledupar	Individual dressage
Gold medal – first place	2022 Valledupar	Team dressage

Julio Cesar Mendoza Loor (Note: In this Spanish name, the first or paternal surname is Mendoza and the second or maternal family name is Loor.) (born 8 April 1979) is an Ecuadorian dressage rider. He has competed at three Pan American Games and became the first Ecuadorian dressage rider to compete at the World Equestrian Games.

Mendoza Loor grew up near Quito, Ecuador, on his family's horse farm. His father was a riding instructor, and as a child, he would ride horses to school. In 2007, Mendoza Loor moved to the United States, eventually settling in Tryon, North Carolina.

He won individual and team gold during the Bolivarian Games in 2017 and 2022, and individual gold at the 2023 Pan American Games. The win was Ecuador's first dressage gold medal in the history of the Pan American games, securing his place to represent Ecuador at the 2024 Summer Olympic Games in Paris.

In February 2024, Mendoza Loor and Jewel's Goldstrike recorded their 20th career win at Florida's World Equestrian Center CDI3*. That summer, they made their first trip to Europe to compete, where they won the IWEST-Prize at CHIO Aachen.

At the 2024 Olympic Games, Mendoza Loor became the first Ecuadorian dressage rider in Olympic history.

== Notes ==
Olympic Games
Preceded by Sarah Escobar	Flagbearer for Ecuador; Paris 2024 with Neisi Dajomes	Succeeded by Incumbent
