= Fencing at the 2027 Pan American Games =

Fencing at the Pan American Games
- Venue: Villa Deportiva Nacional
- Start date: August 3, 2027
- End date: August 8, 2027
- No. of events: (6 men, 6 women)

Fencing competitions at the 2027 Pan American Games in Lima, Peru are scheduled to be held between August 3 and 8, 2027. The fencing events will be held at the Villa Deportiva Nacional, located in Lima.

12 medal events are scheduled to be contested, in the three disciplines of épée, foil and sabre. In each discipline an individual and team event will be held for each gender. A total of 162 fencers qualified to compete at the games.

== Qualification ==
A total of up to 162 fencers will qualify to compete. Each nation may enter a maximum of 18 athletes (nine per gender), unless they qualified an athlete via the Asuncion 2025 Junior Pan American Games. The gold medalists in the individual events of Asuncion 2025 received a nominal place for the Lima 2027 Pan American Games. If the athletes who qualified at the Asuncion 2025 Junior Pan American Games do not participate in the Lima 2027 Pan American Games, said place will be forfeited and cannot be transferred to another NOC or athlete. The top seven teams at the 2026 Pan American Championships, along with the top two individuals not qualified through the team event will qualify for each respective discipline per gender. The host nation, Peru, automatically qualifies the maximum number of fencers (18). A maximum of two athletes from one NOC can enter the individual events. Only the winning countries in Asuncion will have the advantage of competing with 3 fencers in the individual event in case of having qualified for Lima 2027 with the team of their respective weapon.

== Participating nations ==
A total of 17 NOC's qualified fencers. The number of athletes a nation entered is in parentheses beside the name of the country.

- Argentina (16)
- Bolivia (1)
- Brazil (18)
- Canada (18)
- Chile (17)
- Colombia (9)
- Dominican Republic (2)
- Ecuador (1)
- El Salvador (2)
- Mexico (15)
- Panama (2)
- Paraguay (1)
- Peru (19)
- Puerto Rico (3)
- United States (18)
- Venezuela (19)
- Virgin Islands (1)

== Medal summary ==
=== Medal table ===
* Host nation (Peru)

Rank	Nation	Gold	Silver	Bronze	Total
1	Peru*	0	0	0	0
Totals (1 entries)		0	0	0	0

=== Medalists ===
==== Men's ====
Event	Gold	Silver	Bronze
Individual épée			
Team épée			
Individual foil			
Team foil			
Individual sabre			
Team sabre			

==== Women's ====
Event	Gold	Silver	Bronze
Individual épée			
Team épée			
Individual foil			
Team foil			
Individual sabre			
Team sabre			

== See also ==
- Fencing at the 2028 Summer Olympics
