= Márcio Appel =

Brazilian equestrian

Personal information
- Full name: Márcio Appel Cheuiche
- Born: 1 January 1979 (age 47) Campos do Jordão, Brazil

Sport
- Sport: Equestrian sport
- Event: Eventing
Medal record
Equestrian
Representing Brazil
South American Games
Gold medal – first place	2026 Santa Fe	Team eventing

Márcio Appel Cheuiche (born 1 January 1979) is a Brazilian Olympic eventing rider. He competed at the 2016 Summer Olympics in Rio de Janeiro, where he finished 39th in the individual and 7th in the team competition. He also competed at the 2020 Summer Olympics, held July–August 2021 in Tokyo.
