= Volleyball at the 2027 Pan American Games =

Volleyball at the Pan American Games
- Start date: July 23, 2027
- End date: August 8, 2027
- No. of events: 2 (1 men, 1 women)
- Competitors: 192 from 8 nations

Volleyball competitions at the 2027 Pan American Games in Lima, Peru are scheduled to be held from July 23 to August 8.

Each tournament will feature eight men's teams and eight women's teams, each with a maximum of 12 athletes. This indicates that 192 athletes will compete in total.

== Qualification ==
A total of eight men's teams and eight women's team will qualify to compete at the games in each tournament. The host nation (Peru) received automatic qualification in both tournaments. All other teams will qualify through various tournaments.

=== Men ===
Event	Dates	Location	Quota(s)	Qualified
Host nation	—N/a	—N/a	1	Peru
2025 Junior Pan American Games	17–22 August	(Paraguay) Asunción	2	Brazil; Cuba
2026 Copa Sudamericana	5–9 August	(Bolivia) Cochabamba	1	Argentina
2026 South American Volleyball Championship	15–20 September	(Brazil) Rio de Janeiro	1	Chile
2026 Pan-American Cup	7–15 August	(Mexico) Cuernavaca	3	United States; Puerto Rico; Canada
Total			8	

=== Women ===
Event	Dates	Location	Quota(s)	Qualified
Host nation	—N/a	—N/a	1	Peru
2025 Junior Pan American Games	10–15 August	(Paraguay) Asunción	2	Brazil; Mexico
2026 Copa Sudamericana	22–26 July	(Peru) Lima	1	Colombia
2026 South American Volleyball Championship	8–13 September	(Brazil) Rio de Janeiro	1	Argentina
2026 Pan-American Cup	9–19 September	(Mexico) León	3	United States; Dominican Republic; Puerto Rico
Total			8	

== Participating nations ==
Nine national volleyball teams have qualified. The numbers of participants qualified are in parentheses.

- Argentina (24)
- Brazil (24)
- Canada (12)
- Chile (12)
- Colombia (12)
- Cuba (12)
- Dominican Republic (12)
- Mexico (12)
- Peru (24)
- Puerto Rico (24)
- United States (24)

== Medal summary ==
=== Medalists ===
Event	Gold	Silver	Bronze
Men's tournament			
Women's tournament			

== See also ==
- Volleyball at the 2028 Summer Olympics
