= Carolina Espinosa =

Ecuadorean dressage rider

Personal information
- Full name: Carolina Espinosa
- Born: November 17, 1976 (age 49) Quito, Ecuador

Sport
- Sport: Dressage
Medal record
Equestrian
Representing Ecuador
South American Games
Gold medal – first place	2026 Santa Fe	Team dressage
Silver medal – second place	2010 Medellin	Team dressage
Silver medal – second place	2026 Santa Fe	Individual dressage
Bolivarian Games
Gold medal – first place	2017 Santa Marta	Team dressage
Bronze medal – third place	2013 Trujillo	Team dressage

Carolina Espinosa (born November 17, 1976) is an Ecuadorean dressage rider. She won team gold during the 2017 Bolivarian Games in Bogotá, Colombia and team bronze during the 2013 Bolivarian Games in Lima, Peru. She also competed at the 2011 Pan American Games, the 2019 Pan American Games, and the 2023 Pan American Games.
