= Softball at the 2027 Pan American Games =

Softball at the Pan American Games
- Venues: Baseball and Softball Center
- Start date: August 1, 2027
- End date: August 7, 2027
- No. of events: 1 (1 women)
- Competitors: 128 from 8 nations

Softball competitions at the 2027 Pan American Games in Lima, Peru are scheduled to be held from August 1 to 7. The venue for the competition is the softball stadium located at the Villa María del Triunfo cluster.

A total of eight women's teams (each consisting up to 16 athletes) will compete in each tournament. This means a total of 128 athletes are scheduled to compete.

== Qualification ==
A total of eight women's team qualified to compete at the games. The host nation (Peru) qualified automatically, along with the best nation in the Americas WSBC Ranking and the top six teams at the 2025 Pan American Championship.

Event	Dates	Location	Quota(s)	Qualified
Host Nation	—N/a	—N/a	1	Peru
Americas WSBC Ranking	—N/a	—N/a	1	United States
2025 Pan American Championship	June 27 – July 4	(Colombia) Montería	6	Canada; Puerto Rico; Cuba; Mexico; Venezuela; Brazil
Total			8	

== Participating nations ==
A total of 8 countries qualified softball teams.

- Brazil (16)
- Canada (16)
- Cuba (16)
- Mexico (16)
- Peru (16)
- Puerto Rico (16)
- United States (16)
- Venezuela (16)
