= Equestrian at the 2026 South American Games =

Equestrian competitions at the 2026 South American Games

- Venue: Jockey Club Rosario
- Dates: September 13–26
- Competitors: 69 from 9 nations

Equestrian competitions at the 2026 South American Games in Rosario, Santa Fe, and Rafaela, Argentina, were held between September 13 and 26 at Jockey Club Rosario, in Rosario.

A total of 6 open events were contested (three individual and three team). Two eventing events were added, one individual and one team.

== Medal summary ==
=== Medal table ===
* Host nation (Argentina)

Rank	Nation	Gold	Silver	Bronze	Total
1	Brazil	2	2	1	5
2	Ecuador	2	1	0	3
3	Chile	1	0	2	3
4	Uruguay	1	0	1	2
5	Argentina*	0	3	1	4
6	Bolivia	0	0	1	1
Totals (6 entries)		6	6	6	18

=== Medalists ===
Event	Gold	Silver	Bronze
Individual eventing	Mateo Garín on Dakota; Chile	Juan Alberto Benitez on Chaman Ginn; Argentina	Federico Daners on SVR Nagasaki; Uruguay
Team eventing	Brazil; Márcio Appel on Kikita Da Vista; Rafael Fontenelle da Silva on Klaron Jmen; Pedro Maia de Oliveira on Mistica LU; Luiz Soeiro de Faria on Kalifa Da Vista	Argentina; Marcelo Rawson on Aniceto Odin Cobalu; Juan Alberto Benítez on Chaman Ginn; Luciano Brunello on Cash des Cedres	Chile; Mateo Garín on Dakota; Felipe Streitt on ZG Kinggraaf; Juan Manuel Canales on Tinquilco
Individual dressage	Julio Mendoza Loor on Deparon; Ecuador	Carolina Espinosa on Bak Conde; Ecuador	Eduardo Alves de Lima on Ornello V.O; Brazil
Team dressage	Ecuador; Julio Mendoza Loor on Deparon; Carolina Espinosa on Bak Conde; Franziska Klinkicht on Bengalo Guardiola II; María José Granja on Balido CH	Brazil; Eduardo Alves de Lima on Ornello V.O; Paulo César dos Santos on Magnifico Da Sasa JE; Jeferson Pereira on Mestre Da Sasa JE; Frederico Mandrot on Maraja Da Sasa JE	Argentina; Federico de Michelis on Hot Chocolate; Diane Amendolara on Fireking; Leonardo Godoy on Marques Do Lis; Verónica Malberti on Faena D'Atela
Individual jumping	Juan Manuel Luzardo on Guizmo du Riou; Uruguay	José Luiz Guimarães de Carvalho on Barbarella Jmen; Brazil	Karen Boos Pegler on Honesty CTV Z Bolivia
Team jumping	Brazil; Stephan Barcha on Chantily Jmen; Gabriel Gouveia on Ratzinger Jmen; José Roberto Reynoso on Cornet Shot Jmen; José Luiz Guimarães de Carvalho on Barbarella Jmen	Argentina; Damián Ancic on Milenario Solaguayre; Tomás Galilea on Vertigo Waf; Lucas Mesa on Iceman SVG; Manuel Chechic on CD Cristal Z	Chile; Andrés Lausen on RL Kalahari; Alexandr Imschenetzky on Caspaccio; Almendra Resano on Fahrenheit Donibane; Cristobal Boetto on For Chacca PS

== Participation ==
Nine nations participated in the equestrian events of the 2026 South American Games.

- Argentina (13)
- Bolivia (5)
- Brazil (15)
- Chile (10)
- Ecuador (5)
- Paraguay (4)
- Peru (3)
- Uruguay (12)
- Venezuela (2)

== Results ==
=== Individual eventing ===
Rank	Rider	Horse	Nation	Dressage		Cross Country		Jumping		Total
Rank	Rider	Horse	Nation	Points	Rank	Points	Rank	Points	Rank	Total
1st place, gold medalist(s)	Mateo Garín	Chile	Dakota	26.4	1	7.2	2	0	1	33.6
2nd place, silver medalist(s)	Juan Alberto Benítez	Argentina	Chaman Ginn	27.4	4	0	1	8	2	35.4
3rd place, bronze medalist(s)	Federico Daners	Uruguay	SVR Nagasaki	33.1	9	6.4	4	12	3	51.5
4	Rafael Fontenelle da Silva	Brazil	Klaron Jmen	28.8	5	27.6	6	8	4	64.4
5	Pedro Maia de Oliveira	Brazil	Mistica LU	27	3	29	5	11.2	5	67.2
6	Márcio Appel	Brazil	Kikita Da Vista	30.4	8	38.8	8	1.2	6	70.4
7	Marcelo Rawson	Argentina	Aniceto Odin Cobalu	37.8	13	29.2	7	8	7	75
8	Felipe Streitt	Chile	ZG Kinggraaf	26.7	2	11	3	EL		
9	Luciano Brunello	Argentina	Cash des Cedres	29.7	6	EL				
10	Luiz Soeiro de Faria	Brazil	Kalifa Da Vista	30.1	7	EL				
11	Francisco Calvelo	Uruguay	Santa Fe Rocco	34.4	10	EL				
12	Edison Quintana	Uruguay	Maybe Last Chance	36.4	11	EL				
13	Juan Manuel Canales	Chile	Tinquilco	36.8	12	EL				
14	Fabricio Albuquerque	Brazil	Hulk Da Vista	38.6	14	EL				
15	Oscar Pasini	Uruguay	SVR Payador	39.9	15	EL				

=== Team eventing ===
Rank	Nation	Rider	Horse	Dressage			Cross Country			Jumping			Total	
Rank	Nation	Rider	Horse	I	T	Rank	I	T	Rank	I	T	Rank	I	T
1st place, gold medalist(s)	Brazil	Márcio Appel; Rafael Fontanelle da Silva; Pedro Maia de Oliveira; Luiz Soeiro de Faria	Kikita Da Vista; Klaron Jmen; Mistica LU; Kalifa Da Vista	~~30.4~~; 28.8; 27; 30.1	85.9	1	38.8; 27.6; 29; ~~EL~~	181.6	1	1.2; 8; 11.2	202	1	70.4; 64.4; 67.2	202
2nd place, silver medalist(s)	Argentina	Marcelo Rawson; Luciano Brunello; Juan Alberto Benítez	Aniceto Odin Cobalu; Cash des Cedres; Chaman Ginn	37.8; 29.7; 27.4	94.9	3	29.2; EL; 0	294.4	3	8; 8	310.4	2	75; 35.4	310.4
3rd place, bronze medalist(s)	Chile	Felipe Streitt; Juan Manuel Canales; Mateo Garín	ZG Kinggraaf; Tinquilco; Dakota	37.8; 36.8; 26.4	89.9	2	7.2; EL; EL	271.3	2	0	433.5	3	33.6	433.5
4	Uruguay	Óscar Pasini; Federico Daners; Francisco Calvelo; Edison Quintana	SVR Payador; SVR Nagasaki; Santa Fe Rocco; Maybe Last Chance	~~39.9~~; 33.1; 34.4; 36.4	103.9	4	EL; 6.4; EL; ~~EL~~	439.5	4	12	451.5	4	51.5	451.5

=== Individual dressage ===
Rank	Rider	Nation	Horse	PSG / GP		Int I / GPS		Int I / GPF		Total
Rank	Rider	Nation	Horse	Score	Rank	Score	Rank	Score	Rank	Total
1st place, gold medalist(s)	Julio Mendoza Loor	Ecuador	Deparon	72.412	1	70.618	1	76.420	1	219.450
2nd place, silver medalist(s)	Carolina Espinosa	Ecuador	Bak Conde	68.823	2	69.088	2	73.150	2	211.061
3rd place, bronze medalist(s)	Eduardo Alves de Lima	Brazil	Ornello V.O	68.382	3	67.970	4	72.605	3	208.957
4	Frederico Mandrot	Brazil	Maraja Da Sasa JE	67.735	6	67.677	5	71.450	5	206.862
5	Federico de Michelis	Argentina	Hot Chocolate	66.059	8	67.000	7	72.510	4	205.569
6	Franziska Klinkicht	Ecuador	Bengalo Guardiola II	67.588	7	67.118	6	70.525	6	205.231
7	Jeferson Pereira	Brazil	Mestre Da Sasa JE	67.735	5	66.706	8	70.420	7	204.861
8	Paulo César Dos Santos	Brazil	Magnifico Da Sasa JE	68.294	4	68.882	3	67.560	8	204.736
9	Diane Amendolara	Argentina	Fireking	64.676	9	64.441	9	67.115	9	196.232
10	María José Granja	Ecuador	Balido CH	64.206	10	60.676	12	62.810	10	187.692
11	Daniela Araneda	Chile	Unno - Zennon Z	62.294	12	62.706	11	62.420	11	187.420
12	Leonardo Godoy	Argentina	Marques Do Lis	63.630	11	63.659	10	Withdrawn		127.289
13	Constance Porte	Chile	Moro XL	57.912	14	59.882	13	Did not advance		117.794
14	Verónica Malberti	Argentina	Faena D Atela	61.353	13	55.559	14	Di not advance		116.912
15	Fiorella Mengani	Argentina	First Time	54.824	15	Withdrawn				54.824
16	Paulina Morales	Uruguay	Leucon Interagro	44.500	16	Withdrawn				44.500
	Héctor Lazcano	Uruguay	Nazaret	EL	17	Did not advance				
	Carolin Mallmann	Uruguay	Grison	RET	17	Did not advance				

=== Team dressage ===
Rank	Nation	Name	Horse	Grand Prix			Intermediate I / Grand Prix Special			Total
Rank	Nation	Name	Horse	Individual	Team	Rank	Individual	Team	Rank	Total
1st place, gold medalist(s)	Ecuador	Julio Mendoza Loor; Carolina Espinosa; Franziska Klinkicht; María José Granja	Deparon; Bak Conde; Bengalo Guardiola II; Balido CH	68.823; 67.688; 72.412; ~~64.206~~	208.823	1	68.088; 67.118; 70.618; ~~60.676~~	206.824	1	415.647
2nd place, silver medalist(s)	Brazil	Eduardo Alves de Lima; Paulo César Dos Santos; Jeferson Pereira; Frederico Mandrot	Ornello V.O; Magnifico Da Sasa JE; Mestre Da Sasa JE; Maraja Da Sasa JE	68.294; 68.382; 67.735; ~~67.735~~	204.411	2	68.882; 67.970; 67.000; ~~66.706~~	203.852	2	408.263
3rd place, bronze medalist(s)	Argentina	Federico de Michelis; Diane Amendolara; Leonardo Godoy; Verónica Malberti	Hot Chocolate; Fireking; Marques Do Lis; Faena D Atela	64.676; 66.059; ~~61.353~~; 63.630	194.365	3	64.441; 67.677; ~~55.559~~; 63.659	195.777	3	390.142
4	Uruguay	Héctor Lazcano; Carolín Mallmann; Paulina Morales	Nazaret; Grison; Leucon Interagro	EL; 44.500; RET	EL	–	–	–	–	–

=== Individual jumping ===
Rank	Rider	Horse	Nation	First Qualifier	Second Qualifier		Final		Total
Rank	Rider	Horse	Nation	First Qualifier	Round A	Round B	Round A	Round B	Total
1st place, gold medalist(s)	Juan Manuel Luzardo	Uruguay	Guizmo du Riou	4.59	8	0	0	0	12.59
2nd place, silver medalist(s)	José Luiz Guimarães de Carvalho	Brazil	Barbarela Jmen	0.89	8	4	0	0	12.89
3rd place, bronze medalist(s)	Karen Boos	Bolivia	Honesty CTV Z	1.31	4	0	4	4	13.31
4	Tomás Galilea	Argentina	Vertigo Waf	2.52	8	0	4	0	14.52
5	Gabriel de Queroz Gouviea	Brazil	Ratzinger Jmen	2,9	0	0	8	4	14.9
6	José Roberto Reynoso	Brazil	Cornet Shot Jmen	0	4	4	4	4	16
7	Stephan Barcha	Brazil	Chantily Jmen	0.85	4	8	4	0	16.85
8	Manuel Chechic	Argentina	C D Cristal Z	2.21	5	8	4	0	19.21
9	Andrés Lausen	Chile	RL Kalahari	3.88	8	0	4	4	19.88
10	Lucas Mesa	Argentina	Iceman S V G	4.37	12	0	0	5	21.37
11	Cristóbal Boetto	Chile	For Chacca PS	2.9	8	0	12	0	22.9
12	Denis Gouvea	Paraguay	Ragnar van de Kruishoeve	11.14	4	2	0	12	29.14
13	Álvaro González	Chile	HLM Campero	4.09	4	8	4	12	32.09
14	Ignacio Galeano	Paraguay	Cue Channes	11.9	3	5	13	13	45.9
15	Fernando Bedoya	Bolivia	Quallenium de Revel	6.31	13	12	14	16	61.31
16	Sophia Vargas	Paraguay	Catherine Z	14.79	12	0	17	18	61.79
17	Martín Rodríguez	Uruguay	Mendocino	9.33	8	16	13	18	64.33
	Juan Serra	Uruguay	Duke of Blue PS	9.81	8	2	RT		
	Priscila Simpson	Ecuador	Mesut Ozil	4.77	8	0	4	EL	
	Francisco Calvelo	Uruguay	Solaguayre Charita	13.43	21	12	12	WD	
	Damián Ancic	Argentina	Milenario Solaguayre	8.48	0	0	12	WD	
	Diego Iturralde	Bolivia	Jack Daniels TH	12.09	1	12	20	WD	
	Matias Albarracin	Argentina	Pegasus Carnaval du Rio	34.79	WD				
	Gonzalo Bedoya	Bolivia	Zeus Mag Z	10.6	9	EL			
	Valeria Jiménez	Paraguay	Norton G	34.79	12	EL			
	Almendra Resano	Chile	Fahrenheit Donibane	10.69	EL				
	Ivo Roza da Silva	Brazil	Legendary Jmen	6.03	4	16	EL		
	Alexandr Imschenetzky	Chile	Caspaccio	2.62	4	4	WD		
	Diego Acosta	Uruguay	PC Lordtrado	14.7	4	29	WD		
	Diego Bedoya	Bolivia	Quala vd Rollebeek	2.87	8	8	WD		

=== Team jumping ===
Rank	Nation	Rider	Horse	First Qualifier		Final				Total
Rank	Nation	Rider	Horse	First Qualifier		Round A		Round B		Total
Rank	Nation	Rider	Horse	Individual	Team	Individual	Team	Individual	Team	Total
1st place, gold medalist(s)	Brazil	José Roberto Reynoso; Gabriel de Queiroz Gouveia; José Luiz Guimarães de Carvalho; Stephan Barcha	Cornet Shot Jmen; Ratzinger Jmen; Barbarela Jmen; Chantilly Jmen	0; ~~2.90~~; 0.89; 0.85	1.74	4; 0; ~~8~~; 4	8	4; 0; 4; ~~8~~	8	17.74
2nd place, silver medalist(s)	Argentina	Lucas Mesa; Manuel Chechic; Damián Ancic; Tomás Galilea	Iceman S V G C D Cristal Z Milenario Solaguayre; Vertigo Waf	4.37; 2.21; ~~8.48~~; 2.52	9.10	~~12~~; 5; 0; 8	13.00	0; ~~8~~; 0; 0	0	22.10
3rd place, bronze medalist(s)	Chile	Andrés Lausen; Alexandr Imschenetzky; Almendra Resano; Cristóbal Boetto	RL Kalahari; Caspaccio; Fahrenheit Donibane; For Chacca PS	3.88; 2.62; ~~10.69~~; 2.90	9.40	8; 4; ~~EL~~; 8	20.00	0; 4; ~~12~~; 0	4.00	33.40
4	Bolivia	Diego Bedoya; Diego Iturralde; Gonzalo Bedota; Karen Boos	Quala vd Rollebeek; Jack Daniels TH; Zeus Mag Z Honesty CTV Z	2.87; ~~12.09~~; 10.60; 1.31	14.78	8; 1; ~~EL~~; 4	13.00	8; 12; ~~EL~~; 0	20.00	47.78
5	Uruguay	Juan Manuel Lizardo; Juan Serra; Francisco Calvelo; Martín Rodríguez	Guizmo du Riou; Duke of Blue PS; Solaguayre Charita; Mendocino	4.59; 9.81; ~~13.43~~; 9.33	23.73	8; 8; ~~21~~; 8	24.00	0; 2; 12; ~~16~~	14.00	61.73
6	Paraguay	Ignacio Galeano; Valeria Jiménez; Sophia Vargas; Denis Gouvea	Cue Channes; Norton G Catherine Z Ragnar vn de Kruishoeve	11.90; ~~34.79~~; 14.79; 11.14	37.83	3; ~~EL~~; 12; 4	19.00	5; ~~EL~~; 0; 2	7.00	63.83
