= Cuba at the 2027 Pan American Games =

- IOC code: CUB
- NOC: Cuban Olympic Committee

in Lima, Peru 2027 – 2027
- Competitors: 109 in 8 sports
- Medals: Gold 0 Silver 0 Bronze 0 Total 0

Pan American Games appearances (overview)
- 1951; 1955; 1959; 1963; 1967; 1971; 1975; 1979; 1983; 1987; 1991; 1995; 1999; 2003; 2007; 2011; 2015; 2019; 2023; 2027

Cuba is scheduled to compete at the 2027 Pan American Games in Lima, Peru from July 23 to August 8, 2027. This will be Cuba's 20th appearance at the Pan American Games, having competed at every edition of the games since the inaugural edition in 1951.

== Competitors ==
The following is the list of number of competitors (per gender) participating at the games per sport/discipline.

Sport	Men	Women	Total
Archery	1	1	2
Boxing	4	1	5
Field hockey	16	16	32
Gymnastics	1	2	3
Handball	14	14	28
Softball	0	16	16
Volleyball	12	0	12
Wrestling	8	3	11
Total	56	53	109

== Archery ==
Cuba qualified two recurve archers (one man and one woman) through the 2026 Pan American Archery Championships and the 2026 Central American and Caribbean Games.

Athlete	Event	Ranking Round		Round of 32	Round of 16	Quarterfinals	Semifinals	Final / BM	Rank
Athlete	Event	Score	Seed	Opposition Score	Opposition Score	Opposition Score	Opposition Score	Opposition Score	Rank
	Men's individual recurve								
	Women's individual recurve								
	Mixed team recurve			—N/a					

== Boxing ==
Cuba qualified 5 boxers (four men and one woman) after they reached the semifinals at the 2026 Pan American Boxing Championship.

Men

Athlete	Event	Quarterfinal	Semifinal	Final	
Athlete	Event	Opposition Result	Opposition Result	Opposition Result	Rank
	–60 kg				
	–65 kg				
	–70 kg				
	–90 kg				

Women

Athlete	Event	Quarterfinal	Semifinal	Final	
Athlete	Event	Opposition Result	Opposition Result	Opposition Result	Rank
	–70 kg				

== Field hockey ==
Cuba qualified both men's and women's teams as they claimed gold medal at the 2026 Central American and Caribbean Games.

Summary

Team	Event	Group stage				Semifinal	Final / BM / Pl.	
Team	Event	Opposition Result	Opposition Result	Opposition Result	Rank	Opposition Result	Opposition Result	Rank
Cuba men	Men's tournament							
Cuba women	Women's tournament							

== Gymnastics ==
=== Artistic ===
Cuba qualified a team of two gymnasts in artistic (one man and one woman) at the 2026 Pan American Artistic Gymnastics Championships.

Men

Athlete	Event	Qualification						Total	Rank
Athlete	Event	F	PH	R	V	PB	HB	Total	Rank
	Individual all-around								

Qualification Legend: Q = Qualified to apparatus final

Women

Athlete	Event	Qualification				Total	Rank
Athlete	Event	V	UB	BB	F	Total	Rank
	Individual all-around						

Qualification Legend: Q = Qualified to apparatus final

=== Rhythmic ===
Cuba qualified one individual gymnast in rhythmic at the 2026 Pan American Rhythmic Gymnastics Championships.

Individual

Athlete	Event	Apparatus				Total	
Athlete	Event	Ball	Clubs	Hoop	Ribbon	Score	Rank
	All-around						

== Handball ==
Cuba qualified both men's and women's teams as they claimed gold medal at the 2026 Central American and Caribbean Games.

Summary

Team	Event	Group stage				Semifinal	Final / BM / Pl.	
Team	Event	Opposition Result	Opposition Result	Opposition Result	Rank	Opposition Result	Opposition Result	Rank
Cuba men	Men's tournament							
Cuba women	Women's tournament							

== Softball ==
Cuba qualified a women's team (of 16 athletes) after finishing 3rd in the 2025 Pan American Championship.

Summary

Team	Event	Preliminary round				Super Round			Final / BM / Pl.	
Team	Event	Opposition Result	Opposition Result	Opposition Result	Rank	Opposition Result	Opposition Result	Rank	Opposition Result	Rank
Cuba women	Women's tournament									

== Volleyball ==
=== Indoor ===
Cuba qualified a men's team as their junior team claimed the silver medal at the 2025 Junior Pan American Games and were the top ranked team in the North, Central America and Caribbean Volleyball Confederation.

Summary

Team	Event	Group stage				Semifinal	Final / BM / Pl.	
Team	Event	Opposition Result	Opposition Result	Opposition Result	Rank	Opposition Result	Opposition Result	Rank
Cuba men	Men's tournament							

== Wrestling ==
Cuba qualified 11 wrestlers (eight men and three women) through the 2025 Junior Pan American Games and the 2026 Pan American Wrestling Championships.

Key:

- VT – Victory by fall.
- PP – Decision by points – the loser with technical points.
- PO – Decision by points – the loser without technical points.
- SP – Technical superiority – the loser with technical points and a margin of victory of at least 9 (Greco-Roman) or 10 (freestyle) points.
- ST – Great superiority – the loser without technical points and a margin of victory of at least 8 (Greco-Roman) or 10 (freestyle) points.
- VA – Decision by withdrawal

Men

Athlete	Event	Round of 16	Quarterfinal	Semifinal	Repechage	Final / BM	
Athlete	Event	Opposition Result	Opposition Result	Opposition Result	Opposition Result	Opposition Result	Rank
	Freestyle 57 kg						
	Freestyle 74 kg						
	Freestyle 97 kg						
	Greco-Roman 60 kg						
	Greco-Roman 67 kg						
	Greco-Roman 87 kg						
	Greco-Roman 97 kg						
	Greco-Roman 130 kg						

Women

Athlete	Event	Round of 16	Quarterfinal	Semifinal	Repechage	Final / BM	
Athlete	Event	Opposition Result	Opposition Result	Opposition Result	Opposition Result	Opposition Result	Rank
	Freestyle 50 kg						
	Freestyle 57 kg						
	Freestyle 76 kg						
