= Panama at the 2027 Pan American Games =

- IOC code: PAN
- NOC: Panama Olympic Committee

in Lima, Peru 2027 – 2027
- Competitors: 12 in 4 sports
- Medals: Gold 0 Silver 0 Bronze 0 Total 0

Pan American Games appearances (overview)
- 1951; 1955; 1959; 1963; 1967; 1971; 1975; 1979; 1983; 1987; 1991; 1995; 1999; 2003; 2007; 2011; 2015; 2019; 2023

Panama is scheduled to compete at the 2027 Pan American Games in Lima, Peru from July 23 to August 8, 2027. This will Panama's 20th appearance at the Pan American Games, having competed at every edition of the Games since the inaugural edition in 1951.

== Competitors ==
The following is the list of number of competitors (per gender) participating at the games per sport/discipline.

| Sport | Men | Women | Total |
|---|---|---|---|
| Bowling | 2 | 0 | 2 |
| Equestrian | | | 2 |
| Fencing | 1 | 1 | 2 |
| Gymnastics | 1 | 5 | 6 |
| Total | 4 | 6 | 12 |

== Bowling ==
Panama qualified a team of two male bowlers through the 2026 South American Games.

Men

| Athlete | Event | Ranking round | | | | | | | | | | | | | | | | | | Semifinal | Final | |
| Athlete | Event | Block 1 | | | | | | | | Block 2 | | | | | | | | Total | Rank | Opposition Result | Opposition Result | Rank |
| Athlete | Event | 1 | 2 | 3 | 4 | 5 | 6 | 7 | 8 | 9 | 10 | 11 | 12 | 13 | 14 | 15 | 16 | Total | Rank | Opposition Result | Opposition Result | Rank |
|---|---|---|---|---|---|---|---|---|---|---|---|---|---|---|---|---|---|---|---|---|---|---|
| | Singles | | | | | | | | | | | | | | | | | | | | | |
| | Doubles | | | | | | | | | | | | | | | | | | | —N/a | | |

== Equestrian ==
Panama qualified two equestrians (one in Dressage and one in Jumping) at the 2026 Central American and Caribbean Games.

=== Dressage ===
| Athlete | Horse | Event | Prix St. Georges | | Grand Prix Special | | | Grand Prix Freestyle | |
| Athlete | Horse | Event | Score | Rank | Score | Total | Rank | Score | Rank |
|---|---|---|---|---|---|---|---|---|---|
| | | Individual | | | | —N/a | | | |

=== Jumping ===
| Athlete | Horse | Event | Qualification | | | | | | | | | | | Final | | | | | | | |
| Athlete | Horse | Event | Round 1 | | | Round 2.1 | | | Round 2.2 | | | Total | | Round A | | | Round B | | | Total | |
| Athlete | Horse | Event | Faults | Result Time | Rank | Faults | Result Time | Rank | Faults | Result Time | Rank | Faults | Rank | Faults | Result Time | Rank | Faults | Result Time | Rank | Faults | Rank |
|---|---|---|---|---|---|---|---|---|---|---|---|---|---|---|---|---|---|---|---|---|---|
| | | Individual | | | | | | | | | | | | | | | | | | | |

== Fencing ==
Panama qualified two fencers (one per gender) at the 2026 Pan American Fencing Championships.

| Athlete | Event | Pool Round | | Round of 16 | Quarterfinals | Semifinals | Final | |
| Athlete | Event | Victories | Seed | Opposition Score | Opposition Score | Opposition Score | Opposition Score | Rank |
|---|---|---|---|---|---|---|---|---|
| Arturo Dorati | Men's individual épée | | | | | | | |
| Alessandra Aicardi | Women's individual épée | | | | | | | |

== Gymnastics ==
=== Artistic ===
Panama qualified a team of six gymnasts in artistic (one man and five women) at the 2026 Pan American Artistic Gymnastics Championships.

Men

| Athlete | Event | Qualification | | | | | | Total | Rank |
| Athlete | Event | F | PH | R | V | PB | HB | Total | Rank |
|---|---|---|---|---|---|---|---|---|---|
| Richard Atencio | Individual all-around | | | | | | | | |

Qualification Legend: Q = Qualified to apparatus final

Women

Team & Individual Qualification

| Athlete | Event | Final | | | | | |
| Athlete | Event | Apparatus | | | | Total | Rank |
| Athlete | Event | V | UB | BB | F | Total | Rank |
|---|---|---|---|---|---|---|---|
| | Team | | | | | | |
| Total | Team | | | | | | |

Qualification Legend: Q = Qualified to apparatus final
