= Equestrian at the 2026 Central American and Caribbean Games =

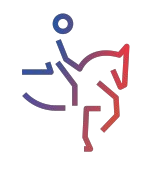
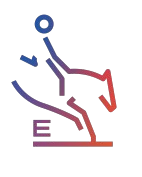
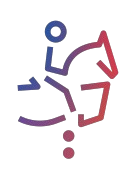
- Venue: Centro Ecuestre Palmarejo
- Location: Palmarejo-Villa Linda, Los Alcarrizos, Santo Domingo Province, Dominican Republic
- Dates: 26 July – 7 August

The equestrian competition at the 2026 Central American and Caribbean Games was held in Palmarejo-Villa Linda, Los Alcarrizos, Santo Domingo Province, Dominican Republic, from 26 July to 7 August 2026 at the Centro Ecuestre Palmarejo.

== Participating nations ==
A total of 13 nations qualified athletes. The number of athletes a nation entered is in parentheses beside the name of the country.

- Bahamas (1)
- Bermuda (1)
- Colombia (12)
- Costa Rica (6)
- Cuba (1)
- Dominican Republic (15)
- El Salvador (1)
- Guatemala (14)
- Honduras (4)
- Mexico (17)
- Panama (2)
- Puerto Rico (4)
- Venezuela (6)

== Medal table ==
* Host nation (Dominican Republic)

Rank	Nation	Gold	Silver	Bronze	Total
1	Mexico (MEX)	6	3	2	11
2	Colombia (COL)	2	4	2	8
3	Venezuela (VEN)	1	0	2	3
4	Guatemala (GUA)	0	1	0	1
4	Panama (PAN)	0	1	0	1
6	Honduras (HON)	0	0	2	2
7	Costa Rica (CRC)	0	0	1	1
Totals (7 entries)		9	9	9	27

== Medal summary ==
=== Dressage events ===
Event	Gold	Silver	Bronze
Individual final	Mexico; Mauricio Lebrija on Son of a Lady	Mexico; Carlos Maldonado on Fortilas	Colombia; Mariana England on Viva Vitalis
Individual overall	Mexico; Mauricio Lebrija on Son of a Lady	Colombia; Mariana England on Viva Vitalis	Mexico; Carlos Maldonado on Fortilas
Team	Mexico; Irvin Leiva on Rahui; Mauricio Lebrija on Son of a Lady; Ricardo Manzano on Aguila Real; Jose Luis Padilla on Johnny Cash	Colombia; María Arango on Macarena; Gabriela Arango on Mambo; Mariana England on Viva Vitalis; Santiago Cardona on Fair Lady	Costa Rica; Michelle Batalla on Cortez; Gloriana Herrera on Monique; Eloisa Acosta on Cali; Ronald Masis on Arlequin VII

=== Eventing events ===
Event	Gold	Silver	Bronze
Individual	Mexico; Fernando Parroquín on Anahuac	Mexico; Luis Ariel Santiago on Castigado	Honduras; Lara Gabrie on Dartans Hillcrest
Team	Mexico; Bischel Hernández on Balanca; Gerardo Parroquín on Ajusco; Luis Ariel Santiago on Castigado; Fernando Parroquín on Anahuac	Colombia; Christian Torres on Maximo; Lucero Desrochers on Nala; William Campos on Elsa; Mauricio Bermúdez on Vardags Saratoga	Honduras; Franklin Ramos on Tamara; Lara Gabrie on Dartans Hillcrest; Jordan Reyes on Holtgraaf

=== Jumping events ===
Event	Gold	Silver	Bronze
Individual	Colombia; Roberto Terán on Henry Jota Apolonio	Panama; Victoria Heurtematte on Quick Chick 3	Mexico; Nicolás Pizarro on Farino du Guinefort
Individual speed	Venezuela; Luis Fernando Larrazabal on Baroness	Guatemala; Lukene Arenas on Mestizo	Colombia; Juan Pablo Betancourt on Henry Jota Peperoni
Individual overall	Mexico; Fernando Parroquín on Escudero	Colombia; Simón Arango on Kadar	Venezuela; Luis Fernando Larrazabal on Baroness
Team	Colombia; Simón Arango on Kadar; Jorge Barrera on Explosive TV; Juan Pablo Betancourt on Henry Jota Peperoni; Roberto Terán on Henry Jota Apolonio	Mexico; Nicolás Pizarro on Farino du Guinefort; Fernando Parroquín on Escudero; Manuel González on Explosivo; Juan Pablo Gaspar on Pina Lotta	Venezuela; Pablo Barrios on Don d'Alme; Alejandro Karolyi on Tempual; Anselmo Alvarado on Charatinus; Luis Fernando Larrazabal on Baroness
