= Ecuador at the 2027 Pan American Games =

- IOC code: ECU
- NOC: Ecuadorian National Olympic Committee

in Lima, Peru 2027 – 2027
- Competitors: 33 in 8 sports
- Medals: Gold 0 Silver 0 Bronze 0 Total 0

Pan American Games appearances (overview)
- 1951; 1955; 1959; 1963; 1967; 1971; 1975; 1979; 1983; 1987; 1991; 1995; 1999; 2003; 2007; 2011; 2015; 2019; 2023; 2027

Ecuador is scheduled to compete at the 2027 Pan American Games in Lima, Peru from July 23 to August 8, 2027. This will be Ecuador's 20th appearance at the Pan American Games, having competed at every edition of the games since the inaugural edition in 1951.

== Competitors ==
The following is the list of number of competitors (per gender) participating at the games per sport/discipline.

Sport	Men	Women	Total
Archery	0	2	2
Boxing	3	0	3
Equestrian			4
Fencing	1	0	1
Gymnastics	2	5	7
Sailing	1	3	4
Squash	3	3	6
Wrestling	2	4	6
Total	12	17	33

== Archery ==
Ecuador qualified one recurve female archer through the 2026 South American Games and one compound female archer through the 2025 Junior Pan American Games.

Athlete	Event	Ranking Round		Round of 32	Round of 16	Quarterfinals	Semifinals	Final / BM	Rank
Athlete	Event	Score	Seed	Opposition Score	Opposition Score	Opposition Score	Opposition Score	Opposition Score	Rank
	Women's individual recurve								
Blanca Bueno	Women's individual compound			—N/a					

== Boxing ==
Ecuador qualified three male boxers after they reached the semifinals at the 2026 Pan American Boxing Championship.

Men

Athlete	Event	Quarterfinal	Semifinal	Final	
Athlete	Event	Opposition Result	Opposition Result	Opposition Result	Rank
	–70 kg				
	–80 kg				
	+90 kg				

== Equestrian ==
Ecuador qualified a team of 4 equestrians in Dressage after winning the 2026 South American Games.

=== Dressage ===
Athlete	Horse	Event	Prix St. Georges		Grand Prix Special			Grand Prix Freestyle	
Athlete	Horse	Event	Score	Rank	Score	Total	Rank	Score	Rank
		Individual				—N/a			
		Team						—N/a	

== Fencing ==
Ecuador qualified one male fencer at the 2026 Pan American Fencing Championships.

Men

Athlete	Event	Pool Round		Round of 16	Quarterfinals	Semifinals	Final	
Athlete	Event	Victories	Seed	Opposition Score	Opposition Score	Opposition Score	Opposition Score	Rank
Thomas Aguinaga	Individual foil							

== Gymnastics ==
=== Artistic ===
Ecuador qualified a team of seven gymnasts in artistic (two men and five women) at the 2026 Pan American Artistic Gymnastics Championships.

Men

Athlete	Event	Qualification						Total	Rank
Athlete	Event	F	PH	R	V	PB	HB	Total	Rank
	Individual all-around								

Qualification Legend: Q = Qualified to apparatus final

Women

Team & Individual Qualification

Athlete	Event	Final					
Athlete	Event	Apparatus				Total	Rank
Athlete	Event	V	UB	BB	F	Total	Rank
	Team						
Total	Team						

Qualification Legend: Q = Qualified to apparatus final

== Sailing ==
Ecuador qualified 2 boats for a total of 4 sailors.

Athlete	Event	Opening series																		Finals				
Athlete	Event	1	2	3	4	5	6	7	8	9	10	11	12	13	14	15	16	Points	Rank	QF	SF	M / F	Points	Rank
	Women's sunfish											—N/a												
	Lightning											—N/a								—N/a				

== Squash ==
Ecuador qualified a full team of six athletes (three men and three women) through the 2026 Pan American Squash Championships.

Men

Athlete	Event	Round of 32	Round of 16	Quarterfinal	Semifinal	Final / BM	
Athlete	Event	Opposition Result	Opposition Result	Opposition Result	Opposition Result	Opposition Result	Rank
	Singles						
	Doubles	—N/a					
	Team	—N/a					

Women

Athlete	Event	Round of 32	Round of 16	Quarterfinal	Semifinal	Final / BM	
Athlete	Event	Opposition Result	Opposition Result	Opposition Result	Opposition Result	Opposition Result	Rank
	Singles						
	Doubles	—N/a					
	Team	—N/a					

Mixed

Athlete	Event	Round of 16	Quarterfinal	Semifinal	Final / BM	
Athlete	Event	Opposition Result	Opposition Result	Opposition Result	Opposition Result	Rank
	Doubles					

== Wrestling ==
Ecuador qualified 6 wrestlers (two men and four women) through the 2025 Junior Pan American Games and the 2026 Pan American Wrestling Championships.

Key:

- VT – Victory by fall.
- PP – Decision by points – the loser with technical points.
- PO – Decision by points – the loser without technical points.
- SP – Technical superiority – the loser with technical points and a margin of victory of at least 9 (Greco-Roman) or 10 (freestyle) points.
- ST – Great superiority – the loser without technical points and a margin of victory of at least 8 (Greco-Roman) or 10 (freestyle) points.
- VA – Decision by withdrawal

Men

Athlete	Event	Round of 16	Quarterfinal	Semifinal	Repechage	Final / BM	
Athlete	Event	Opposition Result	Opposition Result	Opposition Result	Opposition Result	Opposition Result	Rank
	Greco-Roman 60 kg						
	Greco-Roman 67 kg						

Women

Athlete	Event	Round of 16	Quarterfinal	Semifinal	Repechage	Final / BM	
Athlete	Event	Opposition Result	Opposition Result	Opposition Result	Opposition Result	Opposition Result	Rank
	Freestyle 50 kg						
	Freestyle 53 kg						
	Freestyle 57 kg						
	Freestyle 76 kg						
