= Canada at the 2027 Pan American Games =

- IOC code: CAN
- NOC: Canadian Olympic Committee

in Lima, Peru 2027 – 2027
- Competitors: 158 in 11 sports
- Medals: Gold 0 Silver 0 Bronze 0 Total 0

Pan American Games appearances (overview)
- 1955; 1959; 1963; 1967; 1971; 1975; 1979; 1983; 1987; 1991; 1995; 1999; 2003; 2007; 2011; 2015; 2019; 2023; 2027

Canada is scheduled to compete at the 2027 Pan American Games in Lima, Peru from July 23 to August 8, 2027. This will be Canada's 20th appearance at the Pan American Games, having competed at every edition of the games since the inaugural edition in 1951.

== Competitors ==
The following is the list of number of competitors (per gender) participating at the games per sport/discipline.

Sport	Men	Women	Total
Archery	1	1	2
Boxing	3	3	6
Fencing	9	9	18
Field hockey	16	16	32
Gymnastics	7	14	21
Rugby sevens	12	12	24
Sailing	7	8	15
Softball	0	16	16
Squash	3	3	6
Volleyball	12	0	12
Wrestling	3	3	6
Total	73	85	158

== Archery ==
Canada qualified two recurve archers (one man and one woman) through the 2026 Pan American Archery Championships.

Athlete	Event	Ranking Round		Round of 32	Round of 16	Quarterfinals	Semifinals	Final / BM	Rank
Athlete	Event	Score	Seed	Opposition Score	Opposition Score	Opposition Score	Opposition Score	Opposition Score	Rank
	Men's individual recurve								
	Women's individual recurve								
	Mixed team recurve			—N/a					

== Boxing ==
Canada qualified 6 boxers (three men and three women) after they reached the semifinals at the 2026 Pan American Boxing Championship.

Men

Athlete	Event	Quarterfinal	Semifinal	Final	
Athlete	Event	Opposition Result	Opposition Result	Opposition Result	Rank
	–65 kg				
	–80 kg				
	–90 kg				

Women

Athlete	Event	Quarterfinal	Semifinal	Final	
Athlete	Event	Opposition Result	Opposition Result	Opposition Result	Rank
	–54 kg				
	–65 kg				
	–75 kg				

== Fencing ==
Canada qualified a full team of 18 fencers (nine men and nine women), after all six teams finished at least in the top seven at the 2026 Pan American Fencing Championships in Lima, Peru.

Men

Athlete	Event	Pool Round		Round of 16	Quarterfinals	Semifinals	Final	
Athlete	Event	Victories	Seed	Opposition Score	Opposition Score	Opposition Score	Opposition Score	Rank
	Individual épée							
	Individual foil							
	Individual sabre							
	Team épée	—N/a						
	Team foil	—N/a						
	Team sabre	—N/a						

Women

Athlete	Event	Pool Round		Round of 16	Quarterfinals	Semifinals	Final	
Athlete	Event	Victories	Seed	Opposition Score	Opposition Score	Opposition Score	Opposition Score	Rank
	Individual épée							
	Individual foil							
	Individual sabre							
	Team épée	—N/a						
	Team foil	—N/a						
	Team sabre	—N/a						

== Field hockey ==
Canada qualified both men's and women's teams as one of the two best countries not yet qualified in the Field Hockey World Ranking of September 30, 2026.

Summary

Team	Event	Group stage				Semifinal	Final / BM / Pl.	
Team	Event	Opposition Result	Opposition Result	Opposition Result	Rank	Opposition Result	Opposition Result	Rank
Canada men	Men's tournament							
Canada women	Women's tournament							

== Gymnastics ==
=== Artistic ===
Canada qualified a team of ten gymnasts in artistic (five men and five women) at the 2026 Pan American Artistic Gymnastics Championships.

Men

Team & Individual Qualification

Athlete	Event	Final							
Athlete	Event	Apparatus						Total	Rank
Athlete	Event	F	PH	R	V	PB	HB	Total	Rank
	Team								
Total	Team								

Qualification Legend: Q = Qualified to apparatus final

Women

Team & Individual Qualification

Athlete	Event	Final					
Athlete	Event	Apparatus				Total	Rank
Athlete	Event	V	UB	BB	F	Total	Rank
	Team						
Total	Team						

Qualification Legend: Q = Qualified to apparatus final

=== Rhythmic ===
Canada qualified two individual gymnasts and five gymnasts for the group event in rhythmic at the 2026 Pan American Rhythmic Gymnastics Championships.

Individual

Athlete	Event	Apparatus				Total	
Athlete	Event	Ball	Clubs	Hoop	Ribbon	Score	Rank
	All-around						

Group

Athlete	Event	Apparatus		Total	
Athlete	Event	5 balls	3 hoops + 2 clubs	Score	Rank
	All-around				

=== Trampoline ===
Canada qualified four gymnasts in trampoline (two men and two women) at the 2026 Pan American Trampoline and Tumbling Championships.

Men

Athlete	Event	Qualification		Final	
Athlete	Event	Score	Rank	Score	Rank
	Individual				
	Synchronized				

Women

Athlete	Event	Qualification		Final	
Athlete	Event	Score	Rank	Score	Rank
	Individual				
	Synchronized				

== Rugby sevens ==
Canada qualified a men's and a women's team (of 12 athletes each) via status in the Rugby Sevens World Series.

Summary

Team	Event	Group stage				Semifinal	Final / BM / Pl.	
Team	Event	Opposition Result	Opposition Result	Opposition Result	Rank	Opposition Result	Opposition Result	Rank
Canada men	Men's tournament							
Canada women	Women's tournament							

== Sailing ==
Canada qualified 10 boats for a total of 9 sailors.

Men

Athlete	Event	Opening series																		Finals				
Athlete	Event	1	2	3	4	5	6	7	8	9	10	11	12	13	14	15	16	Points	Rank	QF	SF	M / F	Points	Rank
	ILCA 7											—N/a								—N/a				
	49er													—N/a						—N/a				
	Kite																			—N/a			—N/a	

Women

Athlete	Event	Opening series																		Finals				
Athlete	Event	1	2	3	4	5	6	7	8	9	10	11	12	13	14	15	16	Points	Rank	QF	SF	M / F	Points	Rank
	ILCA 6											—N/a								—N/a				
	49erFX													—N/a						—N/a				
	Kite																			—N/a			—N/a	

Mixed

Athlete	Event	Race													Total	
Athlete	Event	1	2	3	4	5	6	7	8	9	10	11	12	M	Points	Rank
	Lightning											—N/a				
	Nacra 17															
	Mixed 470															

== Softball ==
Canada qualified a women's team (of 16 athletes) after winning the 2025 Pan American Championship.

Summary

Team	Event	Preliminary round				Super Round			Final / BM / Pl.	
Team	Event	Opposition Result	Opposition Result	Opposition Result	Rank	Opposition Result	Opposition Result	Rank	Opposition Result	Rank
Canada women	Women's tournament									

== Squash ==
Canada qualified a full team of six athletes (three men and three women) through the 2026 Pan American Squash Championships.

Men

Athlete	Event	Round of 32	Round of 16	Quarterfinal	Semifinal	Final / BM	
Athlete	Event	Opposition Result	Opposition Result	Opposition Result	Opposition Result	Opposition Result	Rank
	Singles						
	Doubles	—N/a					
	Team	—N/a					

Women

Athlete	Event	Round of 32	Round of 16	Quarterfinal	Semifinal	Final / BM	
Athlete	Event	Opposition Result	Opposition Result	Opposition Result	Opposition Result	Opposition Result	Rank
	Singles						
	Doubles	—N/a					
	Team	—N/a					

Mixed

Athlete	Event	Round of 16	Quarterfinal	Semifinal	Final / BM	
Athlete	Event	Opposition Result	Opposition Result	Opposition Result	Opposition Result	Rank
	Doubles					

== Volleyball ==
=== Indoor ===
Canada qualified a men's team after finishing third in the 2026 Men's Pan-American Volleyball Cup.

Summary

Team	Event	Group stage				Semifinal	Final / BM / Pl.	
Team	Event	Opposition Result	Opposition Result	Opposition Result	Rank	Opposition Result	Opposition Result	Rank
Canada men	Men's tournament							

== Wrestling ==
Canada qualified 6 wrestlers (three men and three women) through the 2026 Pan American Wrestling Championships.

Key:

- VT – Victory by fall.
- PP – Decision by points – the loser with technical points.
- PO – Decision by points – the loser without technical points.
- SP – Technical superiority – the loser with technical points and a margin of victory of at least 9 (Greco-Roman) or 10 (freestyle) points.
- ST – Great superiority – the loser without technical points and a margin of victory of at least 8 (Greco-Roman) or 10 (freestyle) points.
- VA – Decision by withdrawal

Men

Athlete	Event	Round of 16	Quarterfinal	Semifinal	Repechage	Final / BM	
Athlete	Event	Opposition Result	Opposition Result	Opposition Result	Opposition Result	Opposition Result	Rank
	Freestyle 65 kg						
	Freestyle 74 kg						
	Freestyle 125 kg						

Women

Athlete	Event	Round of 16	Quarterfinal	Semifinal	Repechage	Final / BM	
Athlete	Event	Opposition Result	Opposition Result	Opposition Result	Opposition Result	Opposition Result	Rank
	Freestyle 50 kg						
	Freestyle 53 kg						
	Freestyle 62 kg						
