= Venezuela at the 2027 Pan American Games =

- IOC code: VEN
- NOC: Venezuelan Olympic Committee

in Lima, Peru 2027 – 2027
- Competitors: 70 in 8 sports
- Medals: Gold 0 Silver 0 Bronze 0 Total 0

Pan American Games appearances (overview)
- 1951; 1955; 1959; 1963; 1967; 1971; 1975; 1979; 1983; 1987; 1991; 1995; 1999; 2003; 2007; 2011; 2015; 2019; 2023; 2027

Venezuela is scheduled to compete at the 2027 Pan American Games in Lima, Peru from July 23 to August 8, 2027. This will be Venezuela's 20th appearance at the Pan American Games, having competed at every edition of the games since the inaugural edition in 1951.

== Competitors ==
The following is the list of number of competitors (per gender) participating at the games per sport/discipline.

Sport	Men	Women	Total
Archery	0	2	2
Bowling	2	2	4
Boxing	1	4	5
Equestrian			4
Fencing	9	10	19
Gymnastics	2	8	10
Softball	0	16	16
Wrestling	6	4	10
Total	20	46	70

== Archery ==
Venezuela qualified one recurve female archer through the 2026 Pan American Archery Championships and one compound female archer through the 2026 South American Games.

Athlete	Event	Ranking Round		Round of 32	Round of 16	Quarterfinals	Semifinals	Final / BM	Rank
Athlete	Event	Score	Seed	Opposition Score	Opposition Score	Opposition Score	Opposition Score	Opposition Score	Rank
	Women's individual recurve								
	Women's individual compound			—N/a					

== Bowling ==
Venezuela qualified a full team of four bowlers (two men and two women) through the 2026 South American Games.

Men

Athlete	Event	Ranking round																		Semifinal	Final	
Athlete	Event	Block 1								Block 2								Total	Rank	Opposition Result	Opposition Result	Rank
Athlete	Event	1	2	3	4	5	6	7	8	9	10	11	12	13	14	15	16	Total	Rank	Opposition Result	Opposition Result	Rank
	Singles																					
	Doubles																			—N/a		

Women

Athlete	Event	Ranking round																		Semifinal	Final	
Athlete	Event	Block 1								Block 2								Total	Rank	Opposition Result	Opposition Result	Rank
Athlete	Event	1	2	3	4	5	6	7	8	9	10	11	12	13	14	15	16	Total	Rank	Opposition Result	Opposition Result	Rank
	Singles																					
	Doubles																			—N/a		

== Boxing ==
Venezuela qualified 5 boxers (one man and four women) after they reached the semifinals at the 2026 Pan American Boxing Championship.

Men

Athlete	Event	Quarterfinal	Semifinal	Final	
Athlete	Event	Opposition Result	Opposition Result	Opposition Result	Rank
	–65 kg				

Women

Athlete	Event	Quarterfinal	Semifinal	Final	
Athlete	Event	Opposition Result	Opposition Result	Opposition Result	Rank
	–51 kg				
	–54 kg				
	–57 kg				
	–75 kg				

== Equestrian ==
Venezuela qualified a team of 4 equestrians in Jumping after reaching the podium at the 2026 Central American and Caribbean Games.

=== Jumping ===
Athlete	Horse	Event	Qualification											Final							
Athlete	Horse	Event	Round 1			Round 2.1			Round 2.2			Total		Round A			Round B			Total	
Athlete	Horse	Event	Faults	Result Time	Rank	Faults	Result Time	Rank	Faults	Result Time	Rank	Faults	Rank	Faults	Result Time	Rank	Faults	Result Time	Rank	Faults	Rank
		Individual																			
		Team		—N/a			—N/a			—N/a				—N/a							

== Fencing ==
Venezuela qualified a full team of 18 fencers (nine men and nine women), after all six teams finished at least in the top seven at the 2026 Pan American Fencing Championships in Lima, Peru. Another female athlete achieved an individual spot at the 2025 Junior Pan American Games.

Men

Athlete	Event	Pool Round		Round of 16	Quarterfinals	Semifinals	Final	
Athlete	Event	Victories	Seed	Opposition Score	Opposition Score	Opposition Score	Opposition Score	Rank
	Individual épée							
	Individual foil							
	Individual sabre							
	Team épée	—N/a						
	Team foil	—N/a						
	Team sabre	—N/a						

Women

Athlete	Event	Pool Round		Round of 16	Quarterfinals	Semifinals	Final	
Athlete	Event	Victories	Seed	Opposition Score	Opposition Score	Opposition Score	Opposition Score	Rank
Victória Hidalgo	Individual épée							
	Individual foil							
	Individual sabre							
	Team épée	—N/a						
	Team foil	—N/a						
	Team sabre	—N/a						

== Gymnastics ==
=== Artistic ===
Venezuela qualified two gymnasts in artistic (one man and one woman) at the 2026 Pan American Artistic Gymnastics Championships.

Men

Athlete	Event	Qualification						Total	Rank
Athlete	Event	F	PH	R	V	PB	HB	Total	Rank
	Individual all-around								

Qualification Legend: Q = Qualified to apparatus final

Women

Athlete	Event	Qualification				Total	Rank
Athlete	Event	V	UB	BB	F	Total	Rank
	Women's individual all-around						

Qualification Legend: Q = Qualified to apparatus final

=== Rhythmic ===
Venezuela qualified two individual gymnasts and five gymnasts for the group event in rhythmic at the 2026 Pan American Rhythmic Gymnastics Championships.

Individual

Athlete	Event	Apparatus				Total	
Athlete	Event	Ball	Clubs	Hoop	Ribbon	Score	Rank
	All-around						

Group

Athlete	Event	Apparatus		Total	
Athlete	Event	5 balls	3 hoops + 2 clubs	Score	Rank
	All-around				

=== Trampoline ===
Venezuela qualified a male gymnast in trampoline at the 2026 Pan American Trampoline and Tumbling Championships.

Men

Athlete	Event	Qualification		Final	
Athlete	Event	Score	Rank	Score	Rank
	Individual				

== Softball ==
Venezuela qualified a women's team (of 16 athletes) by virtue of its campaign in the 2025 Pan American Championship.

Summary

Team	Event	Preliminary round				Super Round			Final / BM / Pl.	
Team	Event	Opposition Result	Opposition Result	Opposition Result	Rank	Opposition Result	Opposition Result	Rank	Opposition Result	Rank
Venezuela women	Women's tournament									

== Wrestling ==
Venezuela qualified 10 wrestlers (six men and four women) through the 2025 Junior Pan American Games and the 2026 Pan American Wrestling Championships.

Key:

- VT – Victory by fall.
- PP – Decision by points – the loser with technical points.
- PO – Decision by points – the loser without technical points.
- SP – Technical superiority – the loser with technical points and a margin of victory of at least 9 (Greco-Roman) or 10 (freestyle) points.
- ST – Great superiority – the loser without technical points and a margin of victory of at least 8 (Greco-Roman) or 10 (freestyle) points.
- VA – Decision by withdrawal

Men

Athlete	Event	Round of 16	Quarterfinal	Semifinal	Repechage	Final / BM	
Athlete	Event	Opposition Result	Opposition Result	Opposition Result	Opposition Result	Opposition Result	Rank
	Freestyle 57 kg						
	Freestyle 74 kg						
	Freestyle 97 kg						
	Freestyle 125 kg						
	Greco-Roman 87 kg						
	Greco-Roman 97 kg						

Women

Athlete	Event	Round of 16	Quarterfinal	Semifinal	Repechage	Final / BM	
Athlete	Event	Opposition Result	Opposition Result	Opposition Result	Opposition Result	Opposition Result	Rank
	Freestyle 53 kg						
	Freestyle 62 kg						
	Freestyle 68 kg						
