= Puerto Rico at the 2027 Pan American Games =

- IOC code: PUR
- NOC: Puerto Rico Olympic Committee

in Lima, Peru 2027 – 2027
- Competitors: 91 in 11 sports
- Medals: Gold 0 Silver 0 Bronze 0 Total 0

Pan American Games appearances (overview)
- 1951; 1955; 1959; 1963; 1967; 1971; 1975; 1979; 1983; 1987; 1991; 1995; 1999; 2003; 2007; 2011; 2015; 2019; 2023; 2027

Puerto Rico is scheduled to compete at the 2027 Pan American Games in Lima, Peru from July 23 to August 8, 2027. This will Puerto Rico's 20th appearance at the Pan American Games, having competed at every edition of the Games since the inaugural edition in 1951.

== Competitors ==
The following is the list of number of competitors (per gender) participating at the games per sport/discipline.

Sport	Men	Women	Total
Archery	2	2	4
Bowling	2	2	4
Boxing	1	0	1
Fencing	2	1	3
Gymnastics	5	2	7
Handball	12	0	12
Sailing	6	6	12
Softball	0	16	16
Table tennis	0	4	4
Volleyball	12	12	24
Wrestling	4	0	4
Total	46	45	91

== Archery ==
Purto Rico qualified one compound female team through the 2026 Pan American Archery Championships and one recurve and one compound male archers through the 2026 Central American and Caribbean Games.

Men

Athlete	Event	Ranking Round		Round of 32	Round of 16	Quarterfinals	Semifinals	Final / BM	Rank
Athlete	Event	Score	Seed	Opposition Score	Opposition Score	Opposition Score	Opposition Score	Opposition Score	Rank
	Men's individual recurve								
	Men's individual compound			—N/a					
	Women's individual compound			—N/a					
	Women's individual compound			—N/a					
	Women's team compound			—N/a					
	Mixed team compound			—N/a					

== Bowling ==
Puerto Rico qualified a full team of four bowlers (two men and two women) through the 2026 Central American and Caribbean Games.

Men

Athlete	Event	Ranking round																		Semifinal	Final	
Athlete	Event	Block 1								Block 2								Total	Rank	Opposition Result	Opposition Result	Rank
Athlete	Event	1	2	3	4	5	6	7	8	9	10	11	12	13	14	15	16	Total	Rank	Opposition Result	Opposition Result	Rank
	Singles																					
	Doubles																			—N/a		

Women

Athlete	Event	Ranking round																		Semifinal	Final	
Athlete	Event	Block 1								Block 2								Total	Rank	Opposition Result	Opposition Result	Rank
Athlete	Event	1	2	3	4	5	6	7	8	9	10	11	12	13	14	15	16	Total	Rank	Opposition Result	Opposition Result	Rank
	Singles																					
	Doubles																			—N/a		

== Boxing ==
Puerto Rico qualified a male boxer after he reached the semifinals at the 2026 Pan American Boxing Championship.

Athlete	Event	Quarterfinal	Semifinal	Final	
Athlete	Event	Opposition Result	Opposition Result	Opposition Result	Rank
	Men's –55 kg				

== Fencing ==
Puerto Rico qualified three fencers (two male and one female) at the 2026 Pan American Fencing Championships and the 2025 Junior Pan American Games.

Athlete	Event	Pool Round		Round of 16	Quarterfinals	Semifinals	Final	
Athlete	Event	Victories	Seed	Opposition Score	Opposition Score	Opposition Score	Opposition Score	Rank
Sebastián García	Men's individual foil							
Adrián Figueredo	Men's individual sabre							
Gabriela Hwang	Women's individual sabre							

== Gymnastics ==
=== Artistic ===
Puerto Rico qualified a team of seven gymnasts in artistic (five men and two women) at the 2026 Pan American Artistic Gymnastics Championships.

Men

Team & Individual Qualification

Athlete	Event	Final							
Athlete	Event	Apparatus						Total	Rank
Athlete	Event	F	PH	R	V	PB	HB	Total	Rank
	Team								
Total	Team								

Qualification Legend: Q = Qualified to apparatus final

Women

Athlete	Event	Qualification				Total	Rank
Athlete	Event	V	UB	BB	F	Total	Rank
	Individual all-around						

Qualification Legend: Q = Qualified to apparatus final

== Handball ==
Puerto Rico qualified a men's team after finishing second at the 2026 Central American and Caribbean Games.

Summary

Team	Event	Group stage				Semifinal	Final / BM / Pl.	
Team	Event	Opposition Result	Opposition Result	Opposition Result	Rank	Opposition Result	Opposition Result	Rank
Puerto Rico men	Men's tournament							

== Sailing ==
Puerto Rico qualified 8 boats for a total of 12 sailors.

Men

Athlete	Event	Opening series																		Finals				
Athlete	Event	1	2	3	4	5	6	7	8	9	10	11	12	13	14	15	16	Points	Rank	QF	SF	M / F	Points	Rank
	ILCA 7											—N/a								—N/a				
	49er													—N/a						—N/a				
	Men's sunfish											—N/a												

Women

Athlete	Event	Opening series																		Finals				
Athlete	Event	1	2	3	4	5	6	7	8	9	10	11	12	13	14	15	16	Points	Rank	QF	SF	M / F	Points	Rank
	IQFoil																							
	ILCA 6											—N/a								—N/a				
	49erFX													—N/a						—N/a				

Mixed

Athlete	Event	Race													Total	
Athlete	Event	1	2	3	4	5	6	7	8	9	10	11	12	M	Points	Rank
	Mixed 470															
	Snipe															

== Softball ==
Puerto Rico qualified a women's team (of 16 athletes) after finishing 2nd in the 2025 Pan American Championship.

Summary

Team	Event	Preliminary round				Super Round			Final / BM / Pl.	
Team	Event	Opposition Result	Opposition Result	Opposition Result	Rank	Opposition Result	Opposition Result	Rank	Opposition Result	Rank
Puerto Rico women	Women's tournament									

== Table tennis ==
Puerto Rico qualified a female player through the 2025 Junior Pan American Games and a team of three female athletes through the 2026 Pan American Championships.

Women

Athlete	Event	Group stage			Round of 32	Round of 16	Quarterfinal	Semifinal	Final / BM	
Athlete	Event	Opposition Result	Opposition Result	Rank	Opposition Result	Opposition Result	Opposition Result	Opposition Result	Opposition Result	Rank
Edmarie Leon	Singles	—N/a								
	Singles	—N/a								
	Singles	—N/a								
	Doubles	—N/a								
	Team				—N/a					

== Volleyball ==
=== Indoor ===
Puerto Rico qualified both men's and women's teams through the 2026 Men's Pan-American Volleyball Cup and the 2026 Women's Pan-American Volleyball Cup.

Summary

Team	Event	Group stage				Semifinal	Final / BM / Pl.	
Team	Event	Opposition Result	Opposition Result	Opposition Result	Rank	Opposition Result	Opposition Result	Rank
Puerto Rico men	Men's tournament							
Puerto Rico women	Women's tournament							

== Wrestling ==
Puerto Rico qualified 4 male wrestlers through the 2026 Pan American Wrestling Championships.

Key:

- VT – Victory by fall.
- PP – Decision by points – the loser with technical points.
- PO – Decision by points – the loser without technical points.
- SP – Technical superiority – the loser with technical points and a margin of victory of at least 9 (Greco-Roman) or 10 (freestyle) points.
- ST – Great superiority – the loser without technical points and a margin of victory of at least 8 (Greco-Roman) or 10 (freestyle) points.
- VA – Decision by withdrawal

Men

Athlete	Event	Round of 16	Quarterfinal	Semifinal	Repechage	Final / BM	
Athlete	Event	Opposition Result	Opposition Result	Opposition Result	Opposition Result	Opposition Result	Rank
	Freestyle 57 kg						
	Freestyle 65 kg						
	Freestyle 86 kg						
	Greco-Roman 130 kg						
