= Dominican Republic at the 2027 Pan American Games =

- IOC code: DOM
- NOC: Dominican Republic Olympic Committee

in Lima, Peru 2027 – 2027
- Competitors: 48 in 9 sports
- Medals: Gold 0 Silver 0 Bronze 0 Total 0

Pan American Games appearances (overview)
- 1951; 1955; 1959; 1963; 1967; 1971; 1975; 1979; 1983; 1987; 1991; 1995; 1999; 2003; 2007; 2011; 2015; 2019; 2023; 2027

Dominican Republic is scheduled to compete at the 2027 Pan American Games in Lima, Peru from July 23 to August 8, 2027. This will Dominican Republic's 19th appearance at the Pan American Games, having competed at every edition of the Games except 1963.

== Competitors ==
The following is the list of number of competitors (per gender) participating at the games per sport/discipline.

Sport	Men	Women	Total
Archery	0	1	1
Bowling	2	0	2
Boxing	4	1	5
Equestrian			5
Fencing	1	1	2
Gymnastics	2	2	4
Handball	0	12	12
Volleyball	0	12	12
Wrestling	5	0	5
Total	14	29	48

== Archery ==
Dominican Republic qualified one female compound archer through the 2026 Central American and Caribbean Games.

Athlete	Event	Ranking Round		Round of 32	Round of 16	Quarterfinals	Semifinals	Final / BM	Rank
Athlete	Event	Score	Seed	Opposition Score	Opposition Score	Opposition Score	Opposition Score	Opposition Score	Rank
	Women's Individual compound			—N/a					

== Bowling ==
Dominican Republic qualified a team of two male bowlers through the 2026 Central American and Caribbean Games.

Men

Athlete	Event	Ranking round																		Semifinal	Final	
Athlete	Event	Block 1								Block 2								Total	Rank	Opposition Result	Opposition Result	Rank
Athlete	Event	1	2	3	4	5	6	7	8	9	10	11	12	13	14	15	16	Total	Rank	Opposition Result	Opposition Result	Rank
	Singles																					
	Doubles																			—N/a		

== Boxing ==
Dominican Republic qualified 5 boxers (four men and one woman) after they reached the semifinals at the 2026 Pan American Boxing Championship.

Men

Athlete	Event	Quarterfinal	Semifinal	Final	
Athlete	Event	Opposition Result	Opposition Result	Opposition Result	Rank
	–55 kg				
	–60 kg				
	–70 kg				
	–80 kg				

Women

Athlete	Event	Quarterfinal	Semifinal	Final	
Athlete	Event	Opposition Result	Opposition Result	Opposition Result	Rank
	–65 kg				

== Equestrian ==
Dominican Republic qualified a team of 5 equestrians (two in Dressage, two in Eventing and one in Jumping) at the 2026 Central American and Caribbean Games.

=== Dressage ===
Athlete	Horse	Event	Prix St. Georges		Grand Prix Special			Grand Prix Freestyle	
Athlete	Horse	Event	Score	Rank	Score	Total	Rank	Score	Rank
		Individual				—N/a			

=== Eventing ===
Athlete	Horse	Event	Dressage		Cross-country			Jumping			Total	
Athlete	Horse	Event	Result	Rank	Penalties	Total	Rank	Penalties	Total	Rank	Penalties	Rank
		Individual										

=== Jumping ===
Athlete	Horse	Event	Qualification											Final							
Athlete	Horse	Event	Round 1			Round 2.1			Round 2.2			Total		Round A			Round B			Total	
Athlete	Horse	Event	Faults	Result Time	Rank	Faults	Result Time	Rank	Faults	Result Time	Rank	Faults	Rank	Faults	Result Time	Rank	Faults	Result Time	Rank	Faults	Rank
		Individual																			

== Fencing ==
Dominican Republic qualified two fencers (one per gender) at the 2026 Pan American Fencing Championships.

Athlete	Event	Pool Round		Round of 16	Quarterfinals	Semifinals	Final	
Athlete	Event	Victories	Seed	Opposition Score	Opposition Score	Opposition Score	Opposition Score	Rank
Gabriel Alfau	Men's individual sabre							
Heyddys Valentín	Women's individual sabre							

== Gymnastics ==
=== Artistic ===
Dominican Republic qualified a team of four gymnasts in artistic (two men and two women) at the 2026 Pan American Artistic Gymnastics Championships.

Men

Athlete	Event	Qualification						Total	Rank
Athlete	Event	F	PH	R	V	PB	HB	Total	Rank
	Individual all-around								

Qualification Legend: Q = Qualified to apparatus final

Women

Athlete	Event	Qualification				Total	Rank
Athlete	Event	V	UB	BB	F	Total	Rank
	Individual all-around						

Qualification Legend: Q = Qualified to apparatus final

== Handball ==
Dominican Republic qualified a women's team after finishing second at the 2026 Central American and Caribbean Games.

Summary

Team	Event	Group stage				Semifinal	Final / BM / Pl.	
Team	Event	Opposition Result	Opposition Result	Opposition Result	Rank	Opposition Result	Opposition Result	Rank
Dominican Republic women	Women's tournament							

== Volleyball ==
=== Indoor ===
Dominican Republic qualified a women's teams after finishing second in the 2026 Women's Pan-American Volleyball Cup.

Summary

Team	Event	Group stage				Semifinal	Final / BM / Pl.	
Team	Event	Opposition Result	Opposition Result	Opposition Result	Rank	Opposition Result	Opposition Result	Rank
Dominican Republic women	Women's tournament							

== Wrestling ==
Dominican Republic qualified 5 male wrestlers through the 2026 Pan American Wrestling Championships.

Key:

- VT – Victory by fall.
- PP – Decision by points – the loser with technical points.
- PO – Decision by points – the loser without technical points.
- SP – Technical superiority – the loser with technical points and a margin of victory of at least 9 (Greco-Roman) or 10 (freestyle) points.
- ST – Great superiority – the loser without technical points and a margin of victory of at least 8 (Greco-Roman) or 10 (freestyle) points.
- VA – Decision by withdrawal

Men

Athlete	Event	Round of 16	Quarterfinal	Semifinal	Repechage	Final / BM	
Athlete	Event	Opposition Result	Opposition Result	Opposition Result	Opposition Result	Opposition Result	Rank
	Freestyle 86 kg						
	Freestyle 97 kg						
	Greco-Roman 60 kg						
	Greco-Roman 87 kg						
	Greco-Roman 97 kg						
