= Mexico at the 2027 Pan American Games =

- IOC code: MEX
- NOC: Mexican Olympic Committee
- Website: www.soycom.org (in Spanish)

in Lima, Peru 23 July 2027 – 8 August 2027
- Competitors: TBD in TBD sports
- Flag bearer (opening): TBD
- Flag bearer (closing): TBD
- Medals: Gold 0 Silver 0 Bronze 0 Total 0

Pan American Games appearances (overview)
- 1951; 1955; 1959; 1963; 1967; 1971; 1975; 1979; 1983; 1987; 1991; 1995; 1999; 2003; 2007; 2011; 2015; 2019; 2023; 2027

Mexico will compete at the 2027 Pan American Games in Lima, Peru from 23 July to 8 August 2027. This will be the country's 20th appearance at the Pan American Games, having competed at every one since the inaugural edition in 1951.

Mexican athletes had an opportunity to qualify for the games at the 2025 Junior Pan American Games and obtained 16 spots for this competition. They had another chance to qualify at the 2026 Central American and Caribbean Games and in other sport-specific championships. In this edition, 20 sports will offer direct qualification to the 2028 Summer Olympics.

== Competitors ==
The following is the list of number of competitors (by gender) who will participate at the games per sport.

Sport	Men	Women	Total
Archery	5	5	10
Athletics	3	4	7
Bowling	2	2	4
Boxing	0	1	1
Canoeing	0	3	3
Cycling	2	0	2
Diving	2	0	2
Equestrian			12
Field hockey	16	16	32
Football	18	0	18
Gymnastics	7	14	21
Karate	0	2	2
Racquetball	3	3	6
Sailing	5	2	7
Softball	0	16	16
Squash	3	3	6
Swimming	2	1	3
Taekwondo	0	2	2
Triathlon	2	2	4
Volleyball	0	12	12
Water Skiing	1	0	1
Wrestling	0	3	3
Total	71	91	174

All cycling, gymnastics, roller sports, and volleyball disciplines are grouped within each of the sports' totals. Open water swimming is included in Swimming.

== Archery ==
Mexico qualified a full team of 10 archers after they finished in the top 4 in all competitions at the 2026 Pan American Archery Championships held in Tlaxcala from 24 to 28 June 2026.

Men

Athlete	Event	Ranking Round		Round of 32	Round of 16	Quarterfinals	Semifinals	Final / BM	Rank
Athlete	Event	Score	Seed	Opposition Score	Opposition Score	Opposition Score	Opposition Score	Opposition Score	Rank
	Individual recurve								
	Individual compound								
	Team recurve			—N/a					
	Team compound			—N/a					

Women

Athlete	Event	Ranking Round		Round of 32	Round of 16	Quarterfinals	Semifinals	Final / BM	Rank
Athlete	Event	Score	Seed	Opposition Score	Opposition Score	Opposition Score	Opposition Score	Opposition Score	Rank
	Individual recurve								
	Individual compound								
	Team recurve			—N/a					
	Team compound			—N/a					

Mixed

Athlete	Event	Ranking Round		Round of 32	Round of 16	Quarterfinals	Semifinals	Final / BM	Rank
Athlete	Event	Score	Seed	Opposition Score	Opposition Score	Opposition Score	Opposition Score	Opposition Score	Rank
	Team recurve								
	Team compound								

== Athletics ==
Mexico qualified three female athletes after winning their competitions at the 2025 Junior Pan American Games. Two male athletes qualified after winning their respective events at the 2026 Pan American Championships in Athletics. Two more qualified after winning the gold medal in their event at the 2026 Central American and Caribbean Games

Key

- Ranks given for track events are overall after all heats are completed
- Q = Qualified for the next round by position
- q = Qualified for the next round by time
- DNF = Did not finish
- PR = Pan American Record

=== Track & Road ===
Men

Athlete	Event	Semifinals		Final	
Athlete	Event	Time	Rank	Time	Rank
César Gómez	3,000 m steeplechase	—N/a			
Ricardo Ortiz	Half marathon race walk	—N/a			

Women

Athlete	Event	Semifinal		Final	
Athlete	Event	Result	Rank	Result	Rank
Dafne Juárez	1500m				
Dafne Juárez	5000m				
Alegna González	Half marathon race walk	—N/a			
Ximena Serrano	Half marathon race walk	—N/a			
Antonia Sánchez	400m hurdles				

=== Field ===
Men

Athlete	Event	Final	
Athlete	Event	Distance	Rank
Jair Portillo	High jump		

== Bowling ==
Mexico qualified a full team of four bowlers (two men and two women) through the 2026 Central American and Caribbean Games.

Men

Athlete	Event	Ranking round																		Semifinal	Final	
Athlete	Event	Block 1								Block 2								Total	Rank	Opposition Result	Opposition Result	Rank
Athlete	Event	1	2	3	4	5	6	7	8	9	10	11	12	13	14	15	16	Total	Rank	Opposition Result	Opposition Result	Rank
	Singles																					
	Doubles																			—N/a		

Women

Athlete	Event	Ranking round																		Semifinal	Final	
Athlete	Event	Block 1								Block 2								Total	Rank	Opposition Result	Opposition Result	Rank
Athlete	Event	1	2	3	4	5	6	7	8	9	10	11	12	13	14	15	16	Total	Rank	Opposition Result	Opposition Result	Rank
	Singles																					
	Doubles																			—N/a		

== Boxing ==
Mexico qualified one boxer through the 2026 Pan American Boxing Championship held in Puebla from 17 to 25 October.

Women

Athlete	Weight	Round of 32	Round of 16	Quarterfinals	Semifinals	Final	Rank
Athlete	Weight	Opposition Result	Opposition Result	Opposition Result	Opposition Result	Opposition Result	Rank
Valeria Amparan	–51 kg						

== Canoeing ==
=== Sprint ===
Mexico qualified 3 female sprint athletes after earning a gold and a silver medal in the 2026 COPAC Pan American Sprint and Paracanoe Championships in Montreal.

Women

Athlete	Event	Heat		Semifinal		Final	
Athlete	Event	Time	Rank	Time	Rank	Time	Rank
Beatriz Briones	K-1 500 m						
Karina Alanís; Maricela Montemayor	K-2 500 m						

Rank indicates position after each round. F = Qualified directly to the final; S = Qualified for the semifinal.

== Cycling ==
=== Mountain biking ===
Mexico qualified a male mountain biker after winning the competition at the 2025 Junior Pan American Games.

Athlete	Event	Time	Rank
Iván Aguilar	Men's cross-country		

=== Road ===
Mexico qualified one biker by winning the competition at the 2025 Junior Pan American Games.

Athlete	Event	Final	
Athlete	Event	Result	Rank
José Antonio Prieto	Men's road race		

== Diving ==
Mexico qualified two male divers by winning their respective events at the 2025 Junior Pan American Games.

Men

Athlete	Event	Qualification		Final	
Athlete	Event	Points	Rank	Points	Rank
David Vázquez	3m springboard				
Kenny Zamudio	10m platform				

== Equestrian ==
Mexico qualified a full team of 12 equestrians (four each in Dressage, Eventing and Jumping) after reaching the podium in all disciplines at the 2026 Central American and Caribbean Games.

=== Dressage ===
Athlete	Horse	Event	Prix St. Georges		Grand Prix Special			Grand Prix Freestyle	
Athlete	Horse	Event	Score	Rank	Score	Total	Rank	Score	Rank
		Individual				—N/a			
		Team						—N/a	

=== Eventing ===
Athlete	Horse	Event	Dressage		Cross-country			Jumping			Total	
Athlete	Horse	Event	Result	Rank	Penalties	Total	Rank	Penalties	Total	Rank	Penalties	Rank
		Individual										
		Team			—N/a			—N/a			—N/a	

=== Jumping ===
Athlete	Horse	Event	Qualification											Final							
Athlete	Horse	Event	Round 1			Round 2.1			Round 2.2			Total		Round A			Round B			Total	
Athlete	Horse	Event	Faults	Result Time	Rank	Faults	Result Time	Rank	Faults	Result Time	Rank	Faults	Rank	Faults	Result Time	Rank	Faults	Result Time	Rank	Faults	Rank
		Individual																			
		Team		—N/a			—N/a			—N/a				—N/a							

== Fencing ==
Mexico obtained 5 spots after the men's foil team obtained a bronze medal and the women's épée team finished in 7th place at the 2026 Pan American Fencing Championships in Lima, Perú.

Individual

Men

Athlete	Event	Pool Round		Round of 16	Quarterfinals	Semifinals	Final	
Athlete	Event	Victories	Seed	Opposition Score	Opposition Score	Opposition Score	Opposition Score	Rank
	Épée							
	Foil							
	Sabre							

Women

Athlete	Event	Pool Round		Round of 16	Quarterfinals	Semifinals	Final	
Athlete	Event	Victories	Seed	Opposition Score	Opposition Score	Opposition Score	Opposition Score	Rank
	Épée							
	Foil							
	Sabre							

Team

Athlete	Event	Quarterfinals	Semifinals/Consolation	Final / BM / PM	
Athlete	Event	Opposition Score	Opposition Score	Opposition Score	Rank
	Men's Foil				
	Women's Épée				

== Field hockey ==
Summary

Team	Event	Group stage				Semifinal	Final / BM / Pl.	
Team	Event	Opposition Result	Opposition Result	Opposition Result	Rank	Opposition Result	Opposition Result	Rank
Mexico	Men's tournament							
Mexico	Women's tournament							

=== Men's ===
Mexico qualified a men's team via the Field Hockey World Ranking.

=== Women's ===
Mexico qualified a women's team by obtaining the silver medal at the 2026 Central American and Caribbean Games.

== Football ==
Summary

Team	Event	Group stage				Semifinal	Final / BM	
Team	Event	Opposition Result	Opposition Result	Opposition Result	Rank	Opposition Result	Opposition Result	Rank
Mexico	Men's tournament							

=== Men's ===
Mexico qualified a men's team of 18 athletes after winning the 2026 CONCACAF U-20 Championship.

== Gymnastics ==
=== Artistic ===
Mexico qualified a team of ten gymnasts (five men and five women) after their performance at the 2026 Pan American Artistic Gymnastics Championships.

Men

Athlete	Event	Qualification										Final									
Athlete	Event	Apparatus								Total	Rank	Apparatus								Total	Rank
Athlete	Event	F	PH	R	V			PB	HB	Total	Rank	F	PH	R	V			PB	HB	Total	Rank
Athlete	Event	F	PH	R	1	2	Average	PB	HB	Total	Rank	F	PH	R	1	2	Average	PB	HB	Total	Rank
	Individual; All-around																				
	Floor																				
	Pommel; Horse																				
	Rings																				
	Vault																				
	Parallel; Bars																				
	Horizontal; Bar																				
	Floor																				
	Pommel; Horse																				
	Rings																				
	Vault																				
	Parallel; Bars																				
	Horizontal; Bar																				
	Floor																				
	Pommel; Horse																				
	Rings																				
	Vault																				
	Parallel; Bars																				
	Horizontal; Bar																				
	Floor																				
	Pommel; Horse																				
	Rings																				
	Vault																				
	Parallel; Bars																				
	Horizontal; Bar																				
	Floor																				
	Pommel; Horse																				
	Rings																				
	Vault																				
	Parallel; Bars																				
	Horizontal; Bar																				
	Team; All-around																				

Some gymnasts decided not to compete in specific apparatus. q= Qualified as other countries exceeded the 2-athlete quota per apparatus.

Women

Athlete	Event	Qualification								Final							
Athlete	Event	Apparatus						Total	Rank	Apparatus						Total	Rank
Athlete	Event	V			UB	BB	F	Total	Rank	V			UB	BB	F	Total	Rank
Athlete	Event	1	2	Average	UB	BB	F	Total	Rank	1	2	Average	UB	BB	F	Total	Rank
	Individual; All-around																
	Vault																
	Uneven; Bars																
	Balance; Beam																
	Floor																
	Vault																
	Uneven; Bars																
	Balance; Beam																
	Floor																
	Vault																
	Uneven; Bars																
	Balance; Beam																
	Floor																
	Vault																
	Uneven; Bars																
	Balance; Beam																
	Floor																
	Vault																
	Uneven; Bars																
	Balance; Beam																
	Floor																
	Team; All-around																

Some gymnasts decided not to compete in specific apparatus. q= Qualified as other countries exceeded the 2-athlete quota per apparatus.

=== Rhythmic ===
Mexico qualified two individual gymnasts and five gymnasts for the group event after their performances at the 2026 Pan American Rhythmic Gymnastics Championships in Rio de Janeiro.

Athlete	Event	Qualification						Final					
Athlete	Event	Hoop	Ball	Clubs	Ribbon	Total	Rank	Hoop	Ball	Clubs	Ribbon	Total	Rank
	Individual; All-around												
	Hoop												
	Ball												
	Clubs												
	Ribbon												
	Hoop												
	Ball												
	Clubs												
	Ribbon												
	Team; All-around												
	5 Balls												
	3 Hoops + 2 Clubs												

=== Trampoline ===
Mexico qualified four gymnasts in trampoline (two men and two women) after reaching the finals at the 2026 Pan American Championships in Medellín, Colombia.

Athlete	Event	Qualification		Final	
Athlete	Event	Score	Rank	Score	Rank
David Carballo	Men's Individual				
Donovan Guevara	Men's Individual				
Mariola Garcia	Women's Individual				
Dafne Navarro	Women's Individual				

== Karate ==
Mexico qualified a female karateka after winning her category at the 2025 Junior Pan American Games.

Kumite

Athlete	Event	Round robin					Semifinal	Final	
Athlete	Event	Opposition Result	Opposition Result	Opposition Result	Opposition Result	Rank	Opposition Result	Opposition Result	Rank
Ana Herrera	−61 kg								

== Racquetball ==
Mexico qualified six racquetball athletes (three men and three women) after winning gold medals in singles and doubles at the 2026 Central American and Caribbean Games.

Men

Athlete	Event	Round of 32	Round of 16	Quarterfinal	Semifinal	Final	
Athlete	Event	Opposition Result	Opposition Result	Opposition Result	Opposition Result	Opposition Result	Rank
Eduardo Portillo	Singles						
Rodrigo Montoya	Singles						
Rodrigo Montoya; Andree Parrilla	Doubles						
Rodrigo Montoya; Andree Parrilla; Eduardo Portillo	Team						

Women

Athlete	Event	Round of 32	Round of 16	Quarterfinal	Semifinal	Final	
Athlete	Event	Opposition Result	Opposition Result	Opposition Result	Opposition Result	Opposition Result	Rank
Alexandra Herrera	Singles						
Montserrat Mejía	Singles						
Montserrat Mejía; Jessica Parrilla	Doubles						
Alexandra Herrera; Montserrat Mejía; Jessica Parrilla	Team						

Mixed

Athlete	Event	Round of 16	Quarterfinal	Semifinal	Final	
Athlete	Event	Opposition Result	Opposition Result	Opposition Result	Opposition Result	Rank
TBA; TBA	Doubles					

== Sailing ==
Mexico qualified 6 boats with 7 athletes (5 men and 2 women) through the 2026 Central American and Caribbean Games, the Long Beach & San Pedro Olympic Classes Regatta and the Cork / Sail Olympic Classes Regatta.

Men

Athlete	Event	Opening series																		Finals				
Athlete	Event	1	2	3	4	5	6	7	8	9	10	11	12	13	14	15	16	Points	Rank	QF	SF	M / F	Points	Rank
	IQFoil																							
	ILCA 7											—N/a								—N/a				
	49er													—N/a						—N/a				
	Kite																			—N/a			—N/a	

Women

Athlete	Event	Opening series																		Finals				
Athlete	Event	1	2	3	4	5	6	7	8	9	10	11	12	13	14	15	16	Points	Rank	QF	SF	M / F	Points	Rank
	IQFoil																							
	ILCA 6											—N/a								—N/a				

== Softball ==
Mexico qualified a women's team (of 16 athletes) by virtue of its campaign in the 2025 Pan American Championship.

Summary

Team	Event	Preliminary round				Super Round			Final / BM / Pl.	
Team	Event	Opposition Result	Opposition Result	Opposition Result	Rank	Opposition Result	Opposition Result	Rank	Opposition Result	Rank
Mexico	Women's tournament									

== Squash ==
Mexico qualified a full team of six athletes (three men and three women) through the 2026 Pan American Squash Championships.

Men

Athlete	Event	Round of 32	Round of 16	Quarterfinal	Semifinal	Final / BM	
Athlete	Event	Opposition Result	Opposition Result	Opposition Result	Opposition Result	Opposition Result	Rank
	Singles						
	Doubles	—N/a					
	Team	—N/a					

Women

Athlete	Event	Round of 32	Round of 16	Quarterfinal	Semifinal	Final / BM	
Athlete	Event	Opposition Result	Opposition Result	Opposition Result	Opposition Result	Opposition Result	Rank
	Singles						
	Doubles	—N/a					
	Team	—N/a					

Mixed

Athlete	Event	Round of 16	Quarterfinal	Semifinal	Final / BM	
Athlete	Event	Opposition Result	Opposition Result	Opposition Result	Opposition Result	Rank
	Doubles					

== Swimming ==
Mexico qualified 2 swimmers by winning events at the 2025 Junior Pan American Games.

Key

- Ranks given are overall position after all heats
- Q = Qualified for Final A
- q = Qualified for Final B
- DNS = Did not start

Men

Athlete	Event	Heat		Final	
Athlete	Event	Time	Rank	Time	Rank
Humberto Nájera	200 m backstroke				

Women

Athlete	Event	Heat		Final	
Athlete	Event	Time	Rank	Time	Rank
Celia Pulido	100 m backstroke				

Open Water Swimming

Mexico qualified one open water swimmer after winning his event at the 2025 Junior Pan American Games.

Athlete	Event	Final	
Athlete	Event	Result	Rank
Paulo Strehlke	Men's 10km		

== Taekwondo ==
Mexico qualified two female athletes after winning their categories at the 2025 Junior Pan American Games.

Kyorugi

Women

Athlete	Event	Round of 16	Quarterfinals	Semifinals	Repechage	Final / BM	
Athlete	Event	Opposition Result	Opposition Result	Opposition Result	Opposition Result	Opposition Result	Rank
Andrea Zambrano	–49 kg						
Zaira Salgado	–57 kg						

== Triathlon ==
Mexico qualified a team of four triathletes (two men and two women) after winning the mixed relay competition in the 2026 Central American and Caribbean Games.

Individual

Athlete	Event	Swim (1.5 km)	Trans 1	Bike (40 km)	Trans 2	Run (10 km)	Total	Rank
	Men's							
	Women's							

Relay

Athlete	Event	Swimming (300 m)	Transition 1	Biking (6.6 km)	Transition 2	Running (1.5 km)	Total	Rank
	Mixed							—N/a
Total	Mixed	—N/a						

== Volleyball ==
=== Indoor ===
Women

Mexico qualified a women's team as their junior team claimed the silver medal at the 2025 Junior Pan American Games and were the top ranked team in the North, Central America and Caribbean Volleyball Confederation.

Summary

Team	Event	Group stage				Semifinal	Final / BM / PM	
Team	Event	Opposition Result	Opposition Result	Opposition Result	Rank	Opposition Result	Opposition Result	Rank
Mexico	Women's tournament							

== Water skiing and Wakeboard ==
Mexico qualified one athlete after winning at the 2025 Junior Pan American Games.

Wakeboard

Athlete	Event	Preliminaries		Repechage		Final	
Athlete	Event	Result	Rank	Result	Rank	Result	Rank
Diego Monsalve	Men's Wakeboard						

== Wrestling ==
Mexico qualified three female wrestlers through the 2026 Pan American Wrestling Championships.

Key:

- VT – Victory by fall.
- PP – Decision by points – the loser with technical points.
- PO – Decision by points – the loser without technical points.
- SP – Technical superiority – the loser with technical points and a margin of victory of at least 9 (Greco-Roman) or 10 (freestyle) points.
- ST – Great superiority – the loser without technical points and a margin of victory of at least 8 (Greco-Roman) or 10 (freestyle) points.
- VA – Decision by withdrawal

Women

Athlete	Event	Round of 16	Quarterfinal	Semifinal	Repechage	Final / BM	
Athlete	Event	Opposition Result	Opposition Result	Opposition Result	Opposition Result	Opposition Result	Rank
	Freestyle 57 kg						
	Freestyle 62 kg						
	Freestyle 76 kg						

== See also ==
- Mexico at the 2025 Junior Pan American Games
- 2026 Central American and Caribbean Games
- Mexico at the 2028 Summer Olympics
