= Bowling at the 2026 South American Games =

Bowling competitions at the 2026 South American Games

- Venue: Norcenter
- Dates: September 16–19
- Competitors: 31 from 10 nations

Bowling competitions at the 2026 South American Games in Rosario, Santa Fe, and Rafaela, Argentina, were held between September 16 and 16 at Norcenter, located in Munro within the Vicente López Partido in Greater Buenos Aires, being one of the two sports that took place outside the host cities, alongside surfing and softball.

A total of 4 events were contested (two men's and two women's). The games gave three qualifying quotas per event for the 2027 Pan American Games bowling competitions.

== Venue ==
(Argentina) Munro
Norcenter
Capacity: n/a

== Medal summary ==
=== Medal table ===
* Host nation (Argentina)

Rank	Nation	Gold	Silver	Bronze	Total
1	Colombia	2	1	0	3
2	Peru	1	1	0	2
3	Argentina	1	0	0	1
4	Aruba	0	1	1	2
4	Brazil	0	1	1	2
6	Panama	0	0	1	1
6	Venezuela	0	0	1	1
Totals (7 entries)		4	4	4	12

=== Medalists ===
Event	Gold	Silver	Bronze
Men's singles	Alexis Plakoudakis; Argentina	Adrián Tokashiki; Peru	Julio Castello; Brazil
Men's doubles	Peru; Alejandro Ishikawa; Adrián Tokashiki	Brazil; Julio Castello; William Hideki	Panama; Donald Lee; William Duen
Women's singles	Juliana Franco; Colombia	María Rodríguez; Colombia	Kamilah Dammers; Aruba
Women's doubles	Colombia; Juliana Franco; María Rodríguez	Aruba; Kamilah Dammers; Abigail Dammers	Venezuela; Patricia de Faría; Karen Marcano

== Participation ==
Ten nations participated in bowling of the 2026 South American Games.

- Argentina (4)
- Aruba (4)
- Bolivia (1)
- Brazil (4)
- Chile (2)
- Colombia (4)
- Panama (2)
- Peru (4)
- Uruguay (2)
- Venezuela (4)

== Results ==
=== Men's singles ===
Rank	Athlete	Nation	1st Round	2nd Round	Total
1st place, gold medalist(s)	Alexis Plakoudakis	Argentina	1324	1317	2641
2nd place, silver medalist(s)	Adrián Tokashiki	Peru	1422	1171	2593
3rd place, bronze medalist(s)	Julio Castello	Brazil	1229	1239	2468
4	Donald Lee	Panama	1187	1279	2466
5	Rodolfo Monacelli	Venezuela	1206	1238	2444
6	William Hideki	Brazil	1175	1265	2440
7	Óscar Rodríguez	Colombia	1175	1261	2436
8	Javier Pardi	Venezuela	1220	1181	2401
9	Marcelo Lamanna	Uruguay	1136	1193	2329
10	Valentino Jacobs	Aruba	1204	1096	2300
11	Joaquín Manrique	Uruguay	1107	1185	2292
12	Lucas Legnani	Argentina	1105	1171	2292
13	Jonathan Bremo	Aruba	1111	1133	2244
14	William Duen	Panama	1129	1088	2217
15	Alejandro Ishikawa	Peru	1166	1034	2200
16	Alfredo Quintana	Colombia	1115	1080	2195
17	Spencer Eddy	Bolivia	1089	1061	2150

=== Men's doubles ===
Rank	Athlete	Nation	1st Round	2nd Round	Total
1st place, gold medalist(s)	Alejandro Ishikawa / Adrián Tokashiki	Peru	2466	2585	5051
2nd place, silver medalist(s)	Julio Castello / William Hideki	Brazil	2415	2558	4973
3rd place, bronze medalist(s)	Donald Lee / William Duen	Panama	2325	2640	4965
4	Alfredo Quintana / Óscar Rodríguez	Colombia	2412	2427	4839
5	Rodolfo Monacelli / Javier Pardi	Venezuela	2199	2607	4806
6	Alexis Plakoudakis / Lucas Legnani	Argentina	2349	2229	4578
7	Valentino Jacobs / Jonathan Bremo	Aruba	2217	2280	4497
8	Joaquín Manrique / Marcelo Lamanna	Uruguay	2059	2137	4196

=== Women's singles ===
Rank	Athlete	Nation	1st Round	2nd Round	Total
1st place, gold medalist(s)	Juliana Franco	Colombia	1317	1317	2634
2nd place, silver medalist(s)	María Rodríguez	Colombia	1269	1264	2533
3rd place, bronze medalist(s)	Kamilah Dammers	Aruba	1210	1216	2426
4	Patricia de Faría	Venezuela	1201	1192	2393
5	Abigail Dammers	Aruba	1212	1084	2296
6	Karen Marcano	Venezuela	1131	1141	2272
7	Jacqueline Soares	Brazil	1187	1060	2247
8	Roberta Camargo	Brazil	1114	1125	2239
9	Vanesa Rinke	Argentina	1140	1096	2236
10	María Caro	Chile	1094	1070	2164
11	Paris Gonzalez	Peru	1080	1070	2150
12	Frida Martínez	Peru	1076	1057	2133
13	Mercedes Pérez	Argentina	1085	1003	2088
14	Javiera Ruiz	Chile	1041	987	2028

=== Women's doubles ===
Rank	Athlete	Nation	1st Round	2nd Round	Total
1st place, gold medalist(s)	Juliana Franco / María Rodríguez	Colombia	2484	2649	5133
2nd place, silver medalist(s)	Kamilah Dammers / Abigail Dammers	Aruba	2195	2345	4540
3rd place, bronze medalist(s)	Patricia de Faría / Karen Marcano	Venezuela	2203	2304	4507
4	Jacqueline Soares / Roberta Camargo	Brazil	2132	2208	4340
5	María Caro / Javiera Ruiz	Chile	2225	2015	4239
6	Vanesa Rinke / Mercedes Pérez	Argentina	2170	1971	4141
7	Paris Gonzalez / Frida Martínez	Peru	1905	2155	4060
