= Esports at the 2026 South American Games =

Esports competitions at the 2026 South American Games

- Venue: L2 Arena
- Dates: September 13–16
- Competitors: 50 from 10 nations

Esports competitions at the 2026 South American Games in Rosario, Santa Fe, and Rafaela, Argentina, were held between September 13 and 16 at L2 Arena in Rosario.

A total of four events were contested, including three different video games (Valorant, EA Sports FC and Assetto Corsa). Held as a demonstration sport during the 2022 games, the sport was included to the games' official program, giving out medals to the events contested during this edition.

== Medal summary ==
=== Medal table ===
* Host nation (Argentina)

Rank	Nation	Gold	Silver	Bronze	Total
1	Argentina*	2	1	1	4
2	Chile	1	1	0	2
2	Peru	1	1	0	2
4	Venezuela	0	1	0	1
5	Colombia	0	0	3	3
6	Ecuador	0	0	1	1
6	Paraguay	0	0	1	1
6	Uruguay	0	0	1	1
Totals (8 entries)		4	4	7	15

=== Medalists ===
Event	Gold	Silver	Bronze
Men's Valorant	Argentina; Gabriel Villanueva; Facundo Chávez; Jerónimo Quirno; Enzo Brito; Luciano Pensa; Federico Riveiro	Chile; Matías Barría; Rodolfo Henríquez; Ignacio Manríquez; Leandro Rojas; Luis Santana	Colombia; Juan P. Preciado; Daniel Albadan; Juan C. Preciado; Johan Rodríguez; Luis Gutiérrez
Men's Valorant	Argentina; Gabriel Villanueva; Facundo Chávez; Jerónimo Quirno; Enzo Brito; Luciano Pensa; Federico Riveiro	Chile; Matías Barría; Rodolfo Henríquez; Ignacio Manríquez; Leandro Rojas; Luis Santana	Uruguay; Juan Bonilla; Mathias Clementino; Lorenzo Coelho; Nicolás González; Ignacio Pérez; Enzo Magnone
Men's EA Sports FC	Luis Suárez; Peru	Jorge Juares; Venezuela	Luis Castellanos; Colombia
Men's EA Sports FC	Luis Suárez; Peru	Jorge Juares; Venezuela	Lautaro Zuviria; Argentina
Women's EA Sports FC	Daniela Arias; Argentina	Patricia Pérez; Peru	Cindy Espinoza; Ecuador
Women's EA Sports FC	Daniela Arias; Argentina	Patricia Pérez; Peru	Verónica Chávez; Paraguay
Assetto Corsa	Ángel Inostroza; Chile	Néctar Coleff; Argentina	Omar Escorcia; Colombia

== Participation ==
Ten nations participated in esports events of the 2026 South American Games.

- Argentina (10)
- Bolivia (1)
- Chile (7)
- Colombia (6)
- Ecuador (3)
- Guyana (2)
- Paraguay (7)
- Peru (3)
- Uruguay (9)
- Venezuela (2)

== Results ==
=== Men's Valorant ===
Group A

Rank	Athlete	Won	Lost	Pts.	Note
1	Argentina	4	0	8	Q
2	Chile	2	1	5	Q
3	Uruguay	1	2	3	Q
4	Colombia	1	3	2	Q
5	Paraguay	0	2	2	

Knockout stage

Semifinals
Argentina	2
Colombia	1
Uruguay	0
Chile	2

Final
Argentina	2
Chile	1

=== Men's EA Sports FC ===
Group A

Rank	Athlete	Won	Lost	Pts.	Note
1	(Argentina) Lautaro Zuviria	4	0	8	Q
2	(Paraguay) Fernando Campos	2	1	5	Q
3	(Ecuador) Juan Vargas	2	2	4	Q
4	(Guyana) Dearon Canterbury	2	2	4	Q
5	(Bolivia) Jhack Umacena	0	4	4	

Group B

Rank	Athlete	Won	Lost	Pts.	Note
1	(Colombia) Luis Castellanos	3	1	6	Q
2	(Venezuela) Jorge Juares	2	1	5	Q
3	(Peru) Luis Suárez	2	2	5	Q
4	(Chile) Claudio Olhaberry	0	1	3	Q
5	(Uruguay) Martín Rey	0	3	1	

Knockout stage

Quarterfinals
(Argentina) Lautaro Zuviria	8
(Chile) Claudio Olhaberry	6
(Ecuador) Juan Vargas	7
(Venezuela) Jorge Juares	10
(Colombia) Luis Castellanos	9
(Guyana) Dearon Cantebury	4
(Peru) Luis Suárez	12
(Paraguay) Fernando Campos	3

Semifinals
(Argentina) Lautaro Zuviria	1
(Peru) Luis Suárez	2
(Colombia) Luis Castellanos	1
(Venezuela) Jorge Juares	2

Final
(Peru) Luis Suárez	2
(Venezuela) Jorge Juares	1

=== Women's EA Sports FC ===
Group A

Rank	Athlete	Won	Lost	Pts.	Note
1	(Argentina) Daniela Arias	3	1	6	Q
2	(Peru) Patricia Pérez	3	1	6	Q
3	(Paraguay) Verónica Chávez	2	1	5	Q
4	(Ecuador) Cindy Espinoza	1	2	3	Q
5	(Uruguay) Manuela López	0	4	0	

Knockout stage

Semifinals
(Argentina) Daniela Arias	2
(Ecuador) Cindy Espinoza	0
(Paraguay) Verónica Chávez	1
(Peru) Patricia Pérez	2

Final
(Argentina) Daniela Arias	2
(Peru) Patricia Pérez	1

=== Assetto Corsa ===
Group stage

Rank	Athlete	QR	Race 1	Race 2	Race 3	Notes
Group A
1	(Peru) Matías Arévalo	2	12	12	15	Q
2	(Colombia) Omar Escorcia	0	15	15	10	Q
3	(Argentina) Paola Chiaraviglio	0	8	8	8	Q
4	(Guyana) Kahlil Rickford	0	10	0	12	
5	(Ecuador) José Macías	0	6	6	6	
Group B
1	(Chile) Ángel Inostroza	2	15	12	12	Q
2	(Argentina) Néctar Coleff	0	12	15	10	Q
3	(Venezuela) Yonhatan Parra	0	10	10	15	Q
4	(Uruguay) Emiliano Ghigi	0	8	8	8	

Medal race

Rank	Athlete	Result
1st place, gold medalist(s)	(Chile) Ángel Inostroza	15
2nd place, silver medalist(s)	(Argentina) Néctar Coleff	12
3rd place, bronze medalist(s)	(Colombia) Omar Escorcia	10
4	(Peru) Matías Arévalo	8
5	(Venezuela) Yonhatan Parra	6
6	(Argentina) Paola Chiaraviglio	
