= Water polo at the 2026 South American Games =

Water polo competitions at the 2026 South American Games

- Venue: Invencible Centro Acuático Provincial
- Dates: September 21–26
- Competitors: 180 from 6 nations

Water polo competitions at the 2026 South American Games in Rosario, Santa Fe, and Rafaela, Argentina, were held between September 21 and 26 at Invencible Centro Acuático Provincial, located within Museo del Deporte Santafesino in Santa Fe.

A total of two tournaments were contested (one men and one women). The games gave a qualifying quota to the gold-medal winning teams from each tournament for the 2027 Pan American Games water polo competitions.

Brazil (men's and women's) was the defending champion for both tournaments. Both teams won their respective tournaments again.

== Participating nations ==
A total of six ODESUR nations participated in the water polo events, with teams of 15 players for each tournament.

- Argentina (30 players)
- Brazil (30)
- Chile (30)
- Colombia (30)
- Peru (30)
- Uruguay (30)

== Medal summary ==
=== Medal table ===
* Host nation (Argentina)

| Rank | Nation | Gold | Silver | Bronze | Total |
|---|---|---|---|---|---|
| 1 | Brazil | 2 | 0 | 0 | 2 |
| 2 | Argentina* | 0 | 2 | 0 | 2 |
| 3 | Colombia | 0 | 0 | 2 | 2 |
| Totals (3 entries) | | 2 | 2 | 2 | 6 |

=== Medalists ===
| Event | Gold | Silver | Bronze |
|---|---|---|---|
| Men's tournament | Brazil; João Gabriel Silveira; Logan Cabral; Gabriel Sojo; Gustavo Coutinho; Lucas Wulfhorst; Paulo Ricardo Oliveira; Rafael Vergara; Pedro Vergara; Alípio Nardaci; Lucas Andrade; Gustavo Guimarães; Luis Ricardo Silva; Alexandre Mendes; Daniel Gallozzi; Frederico Carsalade | Argentina; Nicolás Fernández; Ramiro Veich; Tomás Galimberti; Tomás Tilatti; Nahuel Leona; Tomás Echenique; Ignacio Setti; Guido Poggi; Carlos Camnasio; Esteban Corsi; Iván Saavedra; Teo Soler; Octavio Salas; Ignacio Lucero; Lautaro Camino | Colombia; Camilo Camacho; Juan José Zuluaga; Juan Hernández; Camilo Castillo; Santiago Cuervo; Sebastián Muñoz; Juan Vallejo; Jean Carlo López; Sebastián Rendón; Mateo Martínez; Simón Buitrago; Carlos Sánchez; Tomás Gil; Alejandro Saldarriaga; Kevin Pérez |
| Women's tournament | Brazil; Thatiana Pregolini; Diana Abla; Sofia Souza; Kemily Leão; Letícia Lorieto; Jeniffer Cavalcante; Samantha Rezende; Maiah Nascimento; Letícia Belorio; Rebecca Moreira; Yandra Ramos; Karen de Miranda; Isabela Mendes; Ana Carolina Vasconcelos; Julia Scheer | Argentina; Nahir Stegmayer; Maitena Romano; Bianca Perasso; Isabella Mastronardi; Manuela Tamagnone; Cora Masip; Julieta Auliel; Carla Comba; María Sol Canda; Ana Agnesina; Juana Masini; Isabel Riley; Lola Canales; Carolina Policastro; Lucía Ruiz | Colombia; Isabela Arboleda; Sara Vanegas; María Restrepo; Carolina Ortega; Silvana Barrera; Madelyne Ciro; Daniela Marín; Salomé Agudelo; Daniela Vargas; Laura Hernández; Eliana Cadavid; Liz Ariana López; Isabella Chamorro; Laura Vanegas; María Serna |

== Men's tournament ==
=== Preliminary round ===
The preliminary round consisted of a single group of 6 teams in which each team played once against the other 5 teams in the group on a round-robin format. The top four teams advanced to the semi-finals and the two bottom teams played for the fifth place.

| Pos | Team | Pld | W | D | L | GF | GA | GD | Pts | Qualification |
|---|---|---|---|---|---|---|---|---|---|---|
| 1 | Brazil | 5 | 5 | 0 | 0 | 116 | 32 | +84 | 10 | Semi-finals |
| 2 | Argentina | 5 | 4 | 0 | 1 | 86 | 38 | +48 | 8 | Semi-finals |
| 3 | Colombia | 5 | 3 | 0 | 2 | 64 | 63 | +1 | 6 | Semi-finals |
| 4 | Uruguay | 5 | 2 | 0 | 3 | 49 | 65 | −16 | 4 | Semi-finals |
| 5 | Peru | 5 | 1 | 0 | 4 | 32 | 93 | −61 | 2 | Fifth place match |
| 6 | Chile | 5 | 0 | 0 | 5 | 39 | 95 | −56 | 0 | Fifth place match |

Source: Santa Fe 2026
Rules for classification: 1) points; 2) head-to-head points; 3) head-to-head goal difference; 4) head-to-head number of goals scored; 5) goal difference.

=== Knockout stage ===
The knockout stage consisted of the fifth place match (between the fifth and sixth placed teams of the preliminary stage), the semi-finals and the bronze and gold medal matches. Winners of semi-finals played the gold medal match, while losers played the bronze medal match.

Semi-finals
25 September
Brazil | 19
Uruguay | 6
25 September
Colombia | 12
Argentina | 16

Gold medal match
26 September
Brazil | 16
Argentina | 15
Bronze medal match
26 September
Uruguay | 8
Colombia | 16

| Fifth place match |
| 25 September |
| Peru | 10 |
| Chile | 6 |

=== Final ranking ===
| Rank | Team |
|---|---|
| 1st place, gold medalist(s) | Brazil |
| 2nd place, silver medalist(s) | Argentina |
| 3rd place, bronze medalist(s) | Colombia |
| 4 | Uruguay |
| 5 | Peru |
| 6 | Chile |

== Women's tournament ==
=== Preliminary round ===
The preliminary round consisted of a single group of 6 teams in which each team played once against the other 5 teams in the group on a round-robin format. The top four teams advanced to the semi-finals and the two bottom teams played for the fifth place.

| Pos | Team | Pld | W | D | L | GF | GA | GD | Pts | Qualification |
|---|---|---|---|---|---|---|---|---|---|---|
| 1 | Brazil | 5 | 5 | 0 | 0 | 125 | 21 | +104 | 10 | Semi-finals |
| 2 | Argentina | 5 | 4 | 0 | 1 | 99 | 42 | +57 | 8 | Semi-finals |
| 3 | Colombia | 5 | 3 | 0 | 2 | 78 | 67 | +11 | 6 | Semi-finals |
| 4 | Chile | 5 | 2 | 0 | 3 | 66 | 99 | −33 | 4 | Semi-finals |
| 5 | Peru | 5 | 1 | 0 | 4 | 38 | 97 | −59 | 2 | Fifth place match |
| 6 | Uruguay | 5 | 0 | 0 | 5 | 28 | 108 | −80 | 0 | Fifth place match |

Source: Santa Fe 2026
Rules for classification: 1) points; 2) head-to-head points; 3) head-to-head goal difference; 4) head-to-head number of goals scored; 5) goal difference.

=== Knockout stage ===
The knockout stage consisted of the fifth place match (between the fifth and sixth placed teams of the preliminary stage), the semi-finals and the bronze and gold medal matches. Winners of semi-finals played the gold medal match, while losers played the bronze medal match.

Semi-finals
25 September
Brazil | 30
Chile | 4
25 September
Colombia | 10
Argentina | 17

Gold medal match
26 September
Brazil | 12
Argentina | 5
Bronze medal match
26 September
Chile | 12
Colombia | 18

| Fifth place match |
| 25 September |
| Peru | 19 |
| Uruguay | 6 |

=== Final ranking ===
| Rank | Team |
|---|---|
| 1st place, gold medalist(s) | Brazil |
| 2nd place, silver medalist(s) | Argentina |
| 3rd place, bronze medalist(s) | Colombia |
| 4 | Chile |
| 5 | Peru |
| 6 | Uruguay |
