= Basque pelota at the 2026 South American Games =

Basque pelota competitions at the 2026 South American Games

- Venue: Club Gimnasia y Esgrima (rubber trinquet); Monumento a la Bandera (fronton and frontball)
- Dates: September 20–24
- Competitors: 44 from 8 nations

Basque pelota competitions at the 2026 South American Games in Rosario, Santa Fe, and Rafaela, Argentina, were held between September 20 and 24. The rubber trinquet events took place at Club Gimnasia y Esgrima, while the fronton and frontball events were held at Monumento a la Bandera; both venues are located within the Parque a la Bandera in Rosario.

Basque pelota made its return to the games after being absent during the previous edition. A total of six events were contested (three men and three women). The games gave qualifying quotas to the gold medallists of each event for the 2027 Pan American Games basque pelota competitions.

== Medal summary ==
=== Medal table ===
* Host nation (Argentina)

| Rank | Nation | Gold | Silver | Bronze | Total |
|---|---|---|---|---|---|
| 1 | Peru | 3 | 0 | 0 | 3 |
| 2 | Argentina* | 2 | 3 | 1 | 6 |
| 3 | Venezuela | 1 | 0 | 1 | 2 |
| 4 | Chile | 0 | 1 | 2 | 3 |
| 4 | Uruguay | 0 | 1 | 2 | 3 |
| 6 | Brazil | 0 | 1 | 0 | 1 |
| Totals (6 entries) | | 6 | 6 | 6 | 18 |

=== Medalists ===
==== Men ====
| Event | Gold | Silver | Bronze |
|---|---|---|---|
| Fronton | Cristopher Martínez; Peru | Guillermo Osorio; Argentina | Renato Bolelli; Chile |
| Frontball | Jesús Poma; Peru | Filipe Otheguy; Brazil | Adrián Astorga; Argentina |
| Rubber trinquet | Argentina; Facundo Andreasen; Alfredo Villegas | Chile; Esteban Romero; Julian Stabon | Uruguay; Manuel Pelua; Santiago Varela |

==== Women ====
| Event | Gold | Silver | Bronze |
|---|---|---|---|
| Fronton | Valeria Garcés; Peru | Melina Spahn; Argentina | Diana Rangel; Venezuela |
| Frontball | Julieta Rengel; Venezuela | Micaela Cortez; Argentina | Leonella Acosta; Uruguay |
| Rubber trinquet | Argentina; Lis García; Cynthia Pinto | Uruguay; Sofía Vicente; Camila Naviliat | Chile; Magdalena Muñoz; Rosario Valderrama |

== Participation ==
Eight nations participated in the basque pelota events of the 2026 South American Games.

- Argentina (8)
- Bolivia (8)
- Brazil (1)
- Chile (8)
- Ecuador (1)
- Peru (8)
- Uruguay (6)
- Venezuela (4)

== Results ==
=== Men's fronton ===
Group stage

| Pos | Team | Pld | W | D | L | GF | GA | GD | Pts | Qualification | PER | ARG | CHI | BOL | VEN |
|---|---|---|---|---|---|---|---|---|---|---|---|---|---|---|---|
| 1 | Cristopher Martínez (Peru) | 4 | 4 | 0 | 0 | 8 | 0 | +8 | 12 | Gold medal match | — | 2–0 | 2–0 | 2–0 | 2–0 |
| 2 | Guillermo Osorio (Argentina) | 4 | 3 | 0 | 1 | 6 | 2 | +4 | 9 | Gold medal match | 0–2 | — | 2–0 | 2–0 | 2–0 |
| 3 | Renato Bolelli (Chile) | 4 | 2 | 0 | 2 | 4 | 4 | 0 | 6 | Bronze medal match | 0–2 | 0–2 | — | 2–0 | 2–0 |
| 4 | Daniel Condori (Bolivia) | 4 | 1 | 0 | 3 | 2 | 6 | −4 | 3 | Bronze medal match | 0–2 | 0–2 | 0–2 | — | 2–0 |
| 5 | Víctor Moreno (Venezuela) | 4 | 0 | 0 | 4 | 0 | 8 | −8 | 0 | | 0–2 | 0–2 | 0–2 | 0–2 | — |

Knockout stage

Final
(Peru) Cristopher Martínez | 2
(Argentina) Guillermo Osorio | 0
Bronze-medal match
(Chile) Renato Bolelli | 2
(Bolivia) Daniel Condori | 0

=== Men's frontball ===
Group A

| Pos | Team | Pld | W | D | L | GF | GA | GD | Pts | Qualification | PER | ARG | VEN | URU |
|---|---|---|---|---|---|---|---|---|---|---|---|---|---|---|
| 1 | Jesús Poma (Peru) | 3 | 3 | 0 | 0 | 6 | 0 | +6 | 9 | Semifinals | — | 2–0 | 2–0 | 2–0 |
| 2 | Adrián Astorga (Argentina) | 3 | 2 | 0 | 1 | 4 | 4 | 0 | 6 | Semifinals | 0–2 | — | 2–1 | 2–1 |
| 3 | Junior Delgado (Venezuela) | 3 | 1 | 0 | 2 | 3 | 4 | −1 | 3 | | 0–2 | 1–2 | — | 2–0 |
| 4 | Agustín Paglia (Uruguay) | 3 | 0 | 0 | 3 | 1 | 6 | −5 | 0 | | 0–2 | 1–2 | 0–2 | — |

Group B

| Pos | Team | Pld | W | D | L | GF | GA | GD | Pts | Qualification | BRA | CHI | BOL | ECU |
|---|---|---|---|---|---|---|---|---|---|---|---|---|---|---|
| 1 | Filipe Otheguy (Brazil) | 3 | 3 | 0 | 0 | 6 | 0 | +6 | 9 | Semifinals | — | 2–0 | 2–0 | 2–0 |
| 2 | Gonzalo Fouilloux (Chile) | 3 | 1 | 0 | 2 | 3 | 4 | −1 | 3 | Semifinals | 0–2 | — | 1–2 | 2–0 |
| 3 | Alberto Jiménez (Bolivia) | 3 | 1 | 0 | 2 | 3 | 5 | −2 | 3 | | 0–2 | 2–1 | — | 1–2 |
| 4 | Luis Manosalvas (Ecuador) | 3 | 1 | 0 | 2 | 2 | 5 | −3 | 3 | | 0–2 | 0–2 | 2–1 | — |

Knockout stage

Semifinals
(Chile) Gonzalo Fouilloux | 0
(Peru) Jesús Poma | 2
(Brazil) Filipe Otheguy | 2
(Argentina) Adrián Astorga | 1

Final
(Peru) Jesús Poma | 2
(Brazil) Filipe Otheguy | 0
Bronze-medal match
(Chile) Gonzalo Fouilloux | 0
(Argentina) Adrián Astorga | 2

=== Men's rubber trinquet ===
Group stage

| Pos | Team | Pld | W | D | L | GF | GA | GD | Pts | Qualification | ARG | CHI | URU | PER | BOL |
|---|---|---|---|---|---|---|---|---|---|---|---|---|---|---|---|
| 1 | Facundo Andreasen / Alfredo Villegas (Argentina) | 4 | 4 | 0 | 0 | 8 | 0 | +8 | 12 | Gold medal match | — | 2–0 | 2–0 | 2–0 | 2–0 |
| 2 | Esteban Romero / Julián Stabon (Chile) | 4 | 3 | 0 | 1 | 6 | 3 | +3 | 9 | Gold medal match | 0–2 | — | 2–1 | 2–0 | 2–0 |
| 3 | Manuel Pelua / Santiago Varela (Uruguay) | 4 | 2 | 0 | 2 | 5 | 5 | 0 | 6 | Bronze medal match | 0–2 | 1–2 | — | 2–1 | 2–0 |
| 4 | David Yupanquiaguilar / Andre Bellido (Peru) | 4 | 1 | 0 | 3 | 3 | 6 | −3 | 3 | Bronze medal match | 0–2 | 0–2 | 1–2 | — | 2–0 |
| 5 | Samuel Quispe / Jheison Padilla (Bolivia) | 4 | 0 | 0 | 4 | 0 | 8 | −8 | 0 | | 0–2 | 0–2 | 0–2 | 0–2 | — |

Knockout stage

Final
(Argentina) Facundo Andreasen (Argentina) Alfredo Villegas | 2
(Chile) Julián Stabon (Chile) Esteban Romero | 0
Bronze-medal match
(Uruguay) Santiago Varela (Uruguay) Manuel Pelua | 2
(Peru) David Yupanquiaguilar (Peru) Andre Bellido | 0

=== Women's fronton ===
Group A

| Pos | Team | Pld | W | D | L | GF | GA | GD | Pts | Qualification | PER | ARG | VEN | BOL |
|---|---|---|---|---|---|---|---|---|---|---|---|---|---|---|
| 1 | Valeria Garcés (Peru) | 3 | 3 | 0 | 0 | 6 | 0 | +6 | 9 | Gold medal match | — | 2–0 | 2–0 | 2–0 |
| 2 | Melina Spahn (Argentina) | 3 | 2 | 0 | 1 | 4 | 3 | +1 | 6 | Gold medal match | 0–2 | — | 2–1 | 2–0 |
| 3 | Diana Rangel (Venezuela) | 3 | 1 | 0 | 2 | 3 | 5 | −2 | 3 | Bronze medal match | 0–2 | 1–2 | — | 2–1 |
| 4 | Rocío Rengifo (Bolivia) | 3 | 0 | 0 | 3 | 1 | 6 | −5 | 0 | Bronze medal match | 0–2 | 0–2 | 1–2 | — |

Knockout stage

Final
(Peru) Valeria Garcés | 2
(Argentina) Melina Spahn | 0
Bronze-medal match
(Venezuela) Diana Rangel | 2
(Bolivia) Rocío Rengifo | 0

=== Women's frontball ===
Group stage

| Pos | Team | Pld | W | D | L | GF | GA | GD | Pts | Qualification | VEN | ARG | PER |
|---|---|---|---|---|---|---|---|---|---|---|---|---|---|
| 1 | Julieta Rengel (Venezuela) | 2 | 2 | 0 | 0 | 4 | 0 | +4 | 6 | Semifinals | — | 2–0 | 2–0 |
| 2 | Micaela Cortez (Argentina) | 2 | 1 | 0 | 1 | 2 | 2 | 0 | 3 | Semifinals | 0–2 | — | 2–0 |
| 3 | Cristina Nuñez (Peru) | 2 | 0 | 0 | 2 | 0 | 4 | −4 | 0 | | 0–2 | 0–2 | — |

Group B

| Pos | Team | Pld | W | D | L | GF | GA | GD | Pts | Qualification | URU | CHI | BOL |
|---|---|---|---|---|---|---|---|---|---|---|---|---|---|
| 1 | Leonella Acosta (Uruguay) | 2 | 2 | 0 | 0 | 4 | 0 | +4 | 6 | Semifinals | — | 2–0 | 2–0 |
| 2 | Zita Solas (Chile) | 2 | 1 | 0 | 1 | 2 | 2 | 0 | 3 | Semifinals | 0–2 | — | 2–0 |
| 3 | Abigail Mena (Bolivia) | 2 | 0 | 0 | 2 | 0 | 4 | −4 | 0 | | 0–2 | 0–2 | — |

Knockout stage

Semifinals
(Venezuela) Julieta Rengel | 2
(Chile) Zita Solas | 0
(Uruguay) Leonella Acosta | 0
(Argentina) Micaela Cortez | 2

Final
(Venezuela) Julieta Rengel | 2
(Argentina) Micaela Cortez | 0
Bronze-medal match
(Chile) Zita Solas | 0
(Uruguay) Leonella Acosta | 2

=== Women's rubber trinquet ===
Group stage

| Pos | Team | Pld | W | D | L | GF | GA | GD | Pts | Qualification | ARG | CHI | URU | PER | BOL |
|---|---|---|---|---|---|---|---|---|---|---|---|---|---|---|---|
| 1 | Lis García / Cynthia Pinto (Argentina) | 4 | 4 | 0 | 0 | 8 | 0 | +8 | 12 | Gold medal match | — | 2–0 | 2–0 | 2–0 | 2–0 |
| 2 | Sofía Vicente / Camila Naviliat (Uruguay) | 4 | 3 | 0 | 1 | 6 | 2 | +4 | 9 | Gold medal match | 0–2 | — | 2–0 | 2–0 | 2–0 |
| 3 | Magdalena Muñoz / Rosario Valderrama (Chile) | 4 | 2 | 0 | 2 | 4 | 4 | 0 | 6 | Bronze medal match | 0–2 | 0–2 | — | 2–0 | 2–0 |
| 4 | Jessenia Bernal / Grecia Febres (Peru) | 4 | 1 | 0 | 3 | 2 | 6 | −4 | 3 | Bronze medal match | 0–2 | 0–2 | 0–2 | — | 2–0 |
| 5 | Jessica Mena / Andrea Quiroga (Bolivia) | 4 | 0 | 0 | 4 | 0 | 8 | −8 | 0 | | 0–2 | 0–2 | 0–2 | 0–2 | — |

Knockout stage

Final
(Argentina) Lis García (Argentina) Cynthia Pinto | 2
(Uruguay) Sofía Vicente (Uruguay) Camila Naviliat | 0
Bronze-medal match
(Chile) Rosario Valderrama (Chile) Magdalena Muñoz | 2
(Peru) Jessenia Bernal (Peru) Grecia Febres | 0
