= Triathlon at the 2026 South American Games =

Triathlon competitions at the 2026 South American Games

- Venue: Costanera Este
- Dates: September 16–18
- Competitors: 49 from 11 nations

Triathlon competitions at the 2026 South American Games in Rosario, Santa Fe, and Rafaela, Argentina, were held between September 16 and 18 at Costanera Este, located within Laguna Setúbal in Santa Fe.

A total of 3 events were contested (one men's, one women's and one mixed). The games gave four quotas for the 2027 Pan American Games triathlon competitions.

== Medal summary ==
=== Medal table ===
* Host nation (Argentina)

Rank	Nation	Gold	Silver	Bronze	Total
1	Chile	1	2	0	3
2	Brazil	1	1	0	2
3	Colombia	1	0	0	1
4	Venezuela	0	0	2	2
5	Argentina*	0	0	1	1
Totals (5 entries)		3	3	3	9

=== Medalists ===
Event	Gold		Silver		Bronze	
Men's	Andree Buc; Chile	54:30	Mateo Mendoza; Chile	54:52	Tiago Muñoz; Argentina	54:57
Women's	Carolina Velásquez; Colombia	59:50	Djenyfer Arnold; Brazil	1:00:20	Rosa Martínez; Venezuela	1:00:42
Mixed relay	Brazil; Djenyfer Arnold; Antonio Bravo Neto; Vittória Lopes; Vinicius Sant'Ana	1:25:51	Chile; Dominga Jácome; Mateo Mendoza; Rafaela Capó; Diego Moya	1:25:58	Venezuela; Rosa Martínez; Yhousman Perdomo; Yaniuska Jiménez; Cristian Torrealba	1:26:52

== Participation ==
Eleven nations participated in the diving events of the 2026 South American Games.

- Argentina (6)
- Bolivia (4)
- Brazil (6)
- Chile (6)
- Colombia (4)
- Ecuador (6)
- Panama (1)
- Paraguay (4)
- Peru (4)
- Uruguay (2)
- Venezuela (6)

== Results ==
=== Men's ===
Rank	Name	Nation	Time	Notes
1st place, gold medalist(s)	Andree Buc	Chile	54:30	
2nd place, silver medalist(s)	Mateo Mendoza	Chile	54:52	+0:22
3rd place, bronze medalist(s)	Tiago Muñoz	Argentina	54:57	+0:27
4	Vinicius Sant'Ana	Brazil	55:07	+0:37
5	Diego Moya	Chile	55:08	+0:38
6	Antonio Bravo Neto	Brazil	55:20	+0:50
7	Cristián Torrealba	Venezuela	55:23	+0:53
8	Kauê Willy	Brazil	55:33	+1:03
9	Ramón Matute	Ecuador	55:36	+1:06
10	Gabriel Terán	Ecuador	55:46	+1:16
11	Diego Ladera	Peru	55:56	+1:26
12	Juan Andrade	Ecuador	56:41	+2:11
13	Tadeo Baruffato	Argentina	56:57	+2:27
14	Dixon Hernández	Venezuela	57:30	+3:00
15	Arturo Salinas	Peru	57:39	+3:09
16	Bautista Arbizu	Argentina	57:56	+3:26
17	Oliver Bautista	Panama	57:59	+3:29
	Yhousman Perdomo	Venezuela	DNF	
	Nicolás Gómez	Colombia	LAP	
	Santiago Sierra	Uruguay	LAP	
	Rodrigo Leaño	Bolivia	LAP	
	David Pardo	Paraguay	LAP	
	Fernando Ferreira	Paraguay	LAP	
	Fabricio Mamani	Bolivia	LAP	
	Juan Giraldo	Colombia	LAP	

=== Women's ===
Rank	Name	Nation	Time	Notes
1st place, gold medalist(s)	Carolina Velásquez	Colombia	59:50	
2nd place, silver medalist(s)	Djenyfer Arnold	Brazil	1:00:20	+0:30
3rd place, bronze medalist(s)	Rosa Martínez	Venezuela	1:00:42	+0:52
4	Vittoria Lopes	Brazil	1:01:11	+1:21
5	Rafaela Capó	Chile	1:01:21	+1:31
6	Dominga Jácome	Chile	1:01:41	+1:51
7	Moira Miranda	Argentina	1:02:09	+2:19
8	Giovanna Lacerda	Brazil	1:02:38	+2:48
9	Elizabeth Bravo	Ecuador	1:03:26	+3:36
10	María Bonilla	Ecuador	1:03:33	+3:43
11	Gianella Coaguila	Peru	1:03:35	+3:45
12	Daniela Moya	Chile	1:03:43	+3:53
13	Yaniuska Jiménez	Venezuela	1:03:51	+4:01
14	María Vargas	Argentina	1:04:01	+4:11
15	Sofía de Rosas	Argentina	1:04:06	+4:16
16	Génesis Ruiz	Venezuela	1:04:57	+5:07
17	Paula Jara	Ecuador	1:05:47	+5:57
18	Valentina Álvarez	Colombia	1:06:00	+6:10
19	Carla Larrabeiti	Peru	1:06:23	+6:33
	Susana Guillén	Paraguay	LAP	
	Clara Zubillaga	Uruguay	LAP	
	Gabriela Chávez	Bolivia	LAP	
	Rocío Leaño	Bolivia	LAP	
	Ana Portillo	Paraguay	DNF	

=== Mixed ===
Rank	Name	Nation	Time	Notes
1st place, gold medalist(s)	Djenyfer Arnold; Antonio Bravo Neto; Vittoria Lopes; Vinicius Sant'Ana	Brazil	1:25:51	
2nd place, silver medalist(s)	Dominga Jácome; Mateo Mendoza; Rafaela Capó; Diego Moya	Chile	1:25:58	+0:07
3rd place, bronze medalist(s)	Rosa Martínez; Yhousman Perdomo; Yaniuska Jiménez; Cristián Torrealba	Venezuela	1:26:52	+1:01
4	Moira Miranda; Tiago Muñoz; María Vargas; Tadeo Baruffato	Argentina	1:28:10	+2:19
5	Elizabeth Bravo; Ramón Matute; María Bonilla; Gabriel Terán	Ecuador	1:28:42	+2:51
6	Gianella Coaguila; Arturo Salinas; Carla Larrabeiti; Diego Ladera	Peru	1:29:29	+3:38
7	Susana Guillén; David Pardo; Ana Portillo; Fernando Ferreira	Paraguay	1:39:09	+13:18
8	Gabriela Chávez; Rodrigo Leaño; Rocío Leaño; Fabricio Mamani	Bolivia	1:41:07	+15:16
	Carolina Velásquez; Nicolás Gómez; Valentina Álvarez; Juan Giraldo	Colombia	DNF	
