= Bocce at the 2026 South American Games =

Bocce competitions at the 2026 South American Games

- Venue: Estación Belgrano
- Dates: September 14–17
- Competitors: 34 from 6 nations

Bocce competitions at the 2026 South American Games in Rosario and Rafaela, Santa Fe, Argentina, were held between September 14 and 17 at the former Santa Fe train station of Belgrano Railway in Santa Fe (popularly known as "Estación Belgrano")

A total of four events were contested. The mixed lyonnaise doubles event was dropped while two individual events were added.

== Venue ==
(Argentina) Santa Fe
Estación Belgrano
Capacity: n/a
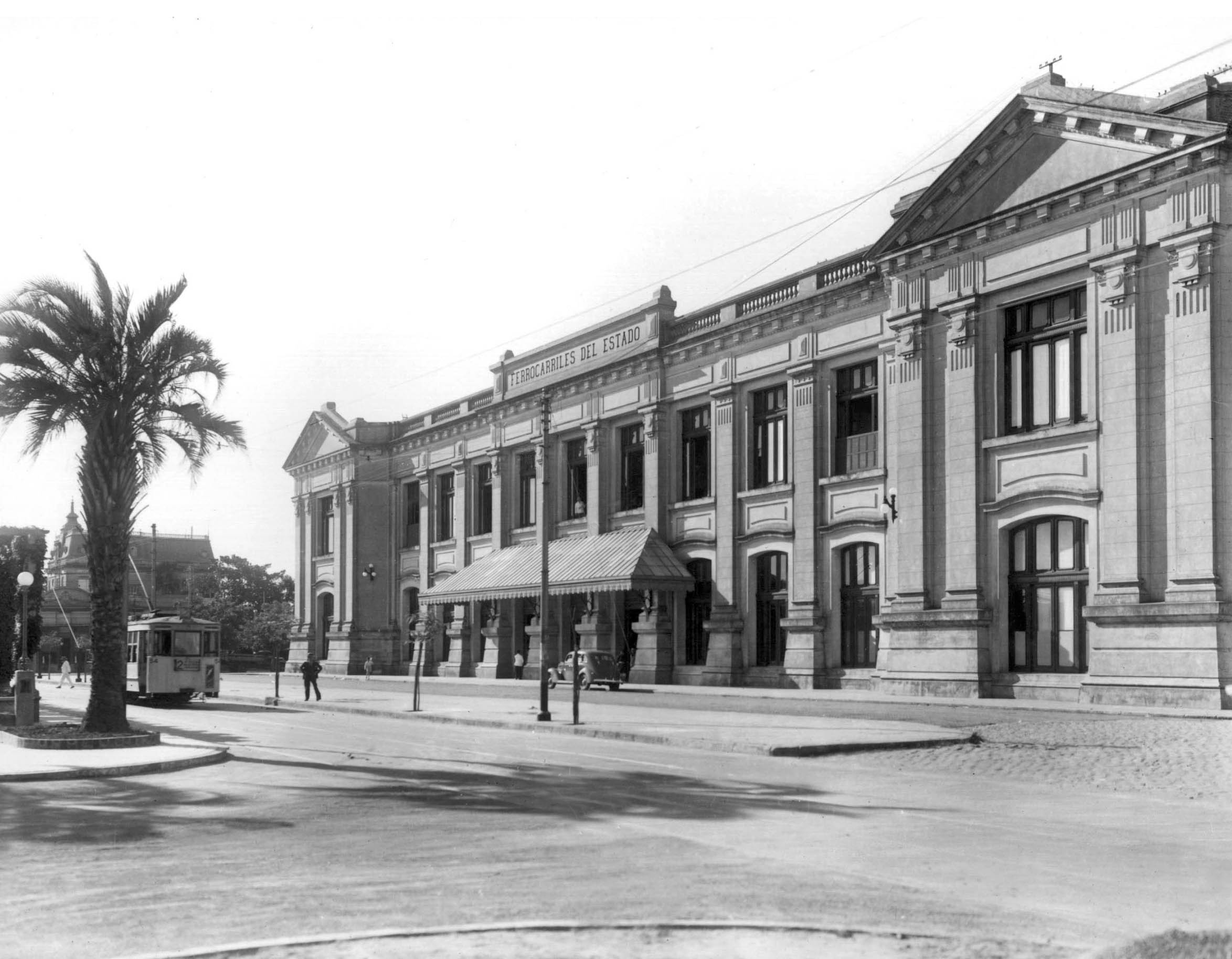

== Medal summary ==
=== Medal table ===
* Host nation (Argentina)

Rank	Nation	Gold	Silver	Bronze	Total
1	Chile	2	1	1	4
2	Venezuela	1	0	1	2
3	Peru	1	0	0	1
4	Argentina*	0	1	3	4
5	Uruguay	0	1	2	3
6	Paraguay	0	1	1	2
Totals (6 entries)		4	4	8	16

=== Medalists ===
Event	Gold	Silver	Bronze
Men's singles	Franco Barbano; Chile	Lucas Hecker; Argentina	Mariel Alves; Paraguay
Men's singles	Franco Barbano; Chile	Lucas Hecker; Argentina	Rubén Garrido; Venezuela
Women's singles	Laura Oses; Venezuela	Karen Sanguinet; Uruguay	Sabrina Polito; Chile
Women's singles	Laura Oses; Venezuela	Karen Sanguinet; Uruguay	Romina Bolatti; Argentina
Mixed pétanque doubles	Tomaz Centa; Rosalba Rojas; Peru	Rodolfo Gálvez; Sabrina Polito; Chile	Gabriel Crespi; Candela Molina; Argentina
Mixed pétanque doubles	Tomaz Centa; Rosalba Rojas; Peru	Rodolfo Gálvez; Sabrina Polito; Chile	Celeste Alaniz; Cristian Calero; Uruguay
Mixed raffa doubles	Rodolfo Gálvez; Franca Martini; Chile	Thaila Krauz; Marcos Moreira; Paraguay	Renzo Farías; Milagros Pereyra; Argentina
Mixed raffa doubles	Rodolfo Gálvez; Franca Martini; Chile	Thaila Krauz; Marcos Moreira; Paraguay	Facundo Fierro; Valentina Pérez; Uruguay

== Participation ==
Six nations participated in bocce events of the 2026 South American Games.

- Argentina (6)
- Chile (4)
- Paraguay (6)
- Peru (6)
- Uruguay (6)
- Venezuela (6)

== Results ==
=== Men's singles ===
Qualification round

Rank	Athlete	Nation	Round 1		Round 2		Total	Result
Rank	Athlete	Nation	Result	Gap	Result	Gap	Total	Result
1	Franco Barbano	Chile	37		37	–1	74	Q
2	Lucas Hecker	Argentina	35	–2	38		73	Q
3	Rubén Garrido	Venezuela	26	–11	29	–4	55	Q
4	Mariel Alves	Paraguay	28	–9	19	–19	47	Q
5	Johny Sanguinet	Uruguay	24	–13	20	–18	44	
6	Kenny Ganaja	Peru	22	–15	19	–19	41	

Knockout stage

Semifinals
(Chile) Franco Barbano	34
(Paraguay) Mariel Alves	21
(Argentina) Lucas Hecker	41
(Venezuela) Rubén Garrido	29

Final
(Chile) Franco Barbano	47
(Argentina) Lucas Hecker	45

=== Women's singles ===
Group A

Pos	Team	Pld	W	D	L	GF	GA	GD	Pts	Qualification	CHI	URU	PER
1	Sabrina Polito (Chile)	2	1	0	1	19	11	+8	3	Semifinals	—	6–9	13–2
2	Karen Sanguinet (Uruguay)	2	1	0	1	16	14	+2	3	Semifinals	9–6	—	7–8
3	Nicole Koster (Peru)	2	1	0	1	10	20	−10	3		2–13	8–7	—

Group B

Pos	Team	Pld	W	D	L	GF	GA	GD	Pts	Qualification	ARG	VEN	PAR
1	Romina Bolatti (Argentina)	2	2	0	0	26	3	+23	6	Semifinals	—	11–0	12–4
2	Laura Oses (Venezuela)	2	1	0	1	7	19	−12	3	Semifinals	0–11	—	11–3
3	Sol Gómez (Paraguay)	2	0	0	2	9	20	−11	0		4–12	3–11	—

Knockout stage

Semifinals
(Chile) Sabrina Polito	3
(Venezuela) Laura Oses	9
(Argentina) Romina Bolatti	8
(Uruguay) Karen Sanguinet	9

Final
(Venezuela) Laura Oses	10
(Uruguay) Karen Sanguinet	7

=== Mixed pétanque doubles ===
Group A

Pos	Team	Pld	W	D	L	GF	GA	GD	Pts	Qualification	PER	ARG	PAR
1	Tomaz Centa / Rosalba Rojas (Peru)	2	1	0	1	26	16	+10	3	Semifinals	—	13–8	13–8
2	Gabriel Crespi / Candela Molina (Argentina)	2	1	0	1	21	15	+6	3	Semifinals	8–13	—	13–2
3	Liz Valdez / Ricardo Bogarín (Paraguay)	2	1	0	1	10	26	−16	3		8–13	2–13	—

Group B

Pos	Team	Pld	W	D	L	GF	GA	GD	Pts	Qualification	CHI	URU	VEN
1	Rodolfo Gálvez / Sabrina Polito (Chile)	2	1	0	1	19	18	+1	3	Semifinals	—	11–12	8–6
2	Celeste Alaniz / Cristián Calero (Uruguay)	2	1	0	1	22	22	0	3	Semifinals	12–11	—	10–11
3	María Pérez Bitriago / José Marcano (Venezuela)	2	1	0	1	17	18	−1	3		6–8	11–10	—

Knockout stage

Semifinals
(Peru) Tomaz Centa (Peru) Rosalba Rojas	13
(Uruguay) Celeste Alaniz (Uruguay) Cristián Calero	1
(Chile) Rodolfo Gálvez (Chile) Sabrina Polito	8
(Argentina) Gabriel Crespi (Argentina) Candela Molina	7

Final
(Peru) Tomaz Centa (Peru) Rosalba Rojas	12
(Chile) Rodolfo Gálvez (Chile) Sabrina Polito	4

=== Mixed raffa doubles ===
Group A

Pos	Team	Pld	W	D	L	GF	GA	GD	Pts	Qualification	CHI	URU	VEN
1	Rodolfo Gálvez / Franca Martini (Chile)	2	2	0	0	23	11	+12	6	Semifinals	—	12–3	11–8
2	Facundo Fierro / Valentina Pérez (Uruguay)	2	1	0	1	20	14	+6	3	Semifinals	3–12	—	12–3
3	Anabel Jiménez / Cristián Velásquez (Venezuela)	2	0	0	2	6	24	−18	0		8–11	3–12	—

Group B

Pos	Team	Pld	W	D	L	GF	GA	GD	Pts	Qualification	PAR	ARG	PER
1	Thalia Kreuz / Marcus Moreira (Paraguay)	2	1	0	1	21	16	+5	3	Semifinals	—	9–12	12–4
2	Renzo Farías / Milagros Pereyra (Argentina)	2	1	0	1	19	18	+1	3	Semifinals	12–9	—	7–9
3	Iván Brecevich / Erica Álvarez (Peru)	2	1	0	1	13	19	−6	3		4–12	9–7	—

Knockout stage

Semifinals
(Chile) Rodolfo Gálvez (Chile) Franca Martini	12
(Argentina) Renzo Farías (Argentina) Milagros Pereyra	5
(Paraguay) Marcus Moreira (Paraguay) Thalia Kreuz	12
(Uruguay) Facundo Fierro (Uruguay) Valentina Pérez	3

Final
(Chile) Rodolfo Gálvez (Chile) Franca Martini	12
(Paraguay) Marcus Moreira (Paraguay) Thalia Kreuz	2
