= Water skiing at the 2026 South American Games =

Water skiing competitions at the 2026 South American Games

- Venue: Lago Sur
- Dates: September 18–20
- Competitors: 44 from 6 nations

Water skiing competitions at the 2026 South American Games in Rosario, Santa Fe, and Rafaela, Argentina, were held between September 18 and 20 at Lago Sur, located within Parque del Sur in Santa Fe.

A total of 10 events were contested (five men's and five women's). The games will give two quotas for the wakeboard events from the 2027 Pan American Games water skiing competitions.

== Medal summary ==
=== Medal table ===
* Host nation (Argentina)

Rank	Nation	Gold	Silver	Bronze	Total
1	Chile	4	5	3	12
2	Argentina*	3	3	5	11
3	Peru	2	0	0	2
4	Colombia	1	2	2	5
Totals (4 entries)		10	10	10	30

=== Medalists ===
==== Men ====
Event	Gold	Silver	Bronze
Jump	Tobías Giorgis; Argentina	Emile Ritter; Chile	Martín Labra; Chile
Overall	Martín Labra; Chile	Tobías Giorgis; Argentina	Francisco Giorgis; Argentina
Slalom	Gustavo Kretschmer; Chile	Antonio Collazo; Argentina	Bautista Ahumada; Argentina
Tricks	Martín Labra; Chile	Matías González; Chile	Francisco Giorgis; Argentina
Wakeboard	Ulf Ditsch; Argentina	Kai Ditsch; Argentina	Jorge Rocha; Colombia

==== Women ====
Event	Gold	Silver	Bronze
Jump	Agustina Varas; Chile	Martina Piedrahita; Colombia	Daniela Verswyvel; Colombia
Overall	Daniela Verswyvel; Colombia	Agustina Varas; Chile	Dominga González; Chile
Slalom	Cristhina de Osma; Peru	Trinidad Espinal; Chile	Violeta Mociulsky; Argentina
Tricks	Natalia Cuglievan; Peru	Daniela Verswyvel; Colombia	Dominga González; Chile
Wakeboard	Eugenia de Armas; Argentina	Ignacia Holscher; Chile	María Victoria de Armas; Argentina

== Participation ==
Six nations participated in the water skiing events of the 2026 South American Games.

- Argentina (12)
- Brazil (3)
- Chile (10)
- Colombia (8)
- Paraguay (6)
- Peru (5)

== Results ==
=== Men's jump ===
Rank	Athlete	Nation	Preliminary round			Final
Rank	Athlete	Nation	Result	Rank	Notes	Final
1st place, gold medalist(s)	Tobías Giorgis	Argentina	58.8	1	Q	58.1
2nd place, silver medalist(s)	Emile Ritter	Chile	37.7	5	Q	58.0
3rd place, bronze medalist(s)	Martín Labra	Chile	54.7	3	Q	56.7
4	Francisco Giorgis	Argentina	55.4	2	Q	54.7
5	Noé Osorio	Colombia	40.9	4	Q	42.4
6	Raúl Codas	Paraguay	29.7	6	Q	28.0
7	Diego Tejada	Peru	26.6	7		Did not advance
8	Cristóbal Chocano	Peru	21.4	8		Did not advance

=== Men's overall ===
Rank	Athlete	Nation	Preliminary round			
Rank	Athlete	Nation	Slalom	Tricks	Jump	Total
1st place, gold medalist(s)	Martín Labra	Chile	957.45	975.83	899.39	2832.67
2nd place, silver medalist(s)	Tobías Giorgis	Argentina	1000.00	684.93	1000.00	2684.93
3rd place, bronze medalist(s)	Francisco Giorgis	Argentina	893.62	584.21	963.41	2441.24
4	Matías González	Chile	957.45	1000.00		1957.45
5	Noé Osorio	Colombia	776.60	250.60	518.29	1545.49
6	Raúl Codas	Paraguay	691.49	220.79	149.39	1061.67

=== Men's slalom ===
Rank	Athlete	Nation	Preliminary round			Final
Rank	Athlete	Nation	Result	Rank	Notes	Final
1st place, gold medalist(s)	Gustavo Kretschmer	Chile	3.00/58/10.75	1	Q	5.00/58/11.25
2nd place, silver medalist(s)	Antonio Collazo	Argentina	2.50/58/10.75	2	Q	4.00/58/11.25
3rd place, bronze medalist(s)	Bautista Ahumada	Argentina	6.00/58/11.25	3	Q	4.00/58/11.25
4	Felipe Nieves	Brazil	2.50/58/11.25	6	Q	4.00/58/11.25
5	Santiago Correa	Colombia	4.50/58/11.25	4	Q	3.00/58/11.25
6	Matías González	Chile	2.00/58/11.25	5	Q	5.00/58/13.00
7	Tobías Giorgis	Argentina	3.00/58/11.25	7		Did not advance
8	Francisco Giorgis	Argentina	2.00/58/12.00	8		Did not advance
=9	Pablo Alvira	Colombia	0.50/58/12.00	9		Did not advance
=9	Noé Osorio	Colombia	0.50/58/12.00	9		Did not advance
11	Martín Labra	Chile	0.00/58/12.00	11		Did not advance
12	Raúl Codas	Paraguay	4.00/58/13.00	12		Did not advance
13	Fernando Cáceres	Paraguay	0.00/58/13.00	13		Did not advance
14	Diego Tejada	Peru	3.00/58/14.25	14		Did not advance
15	Cristóbal Chocano	Peru	3.50/58/18.25	15		Did not advance
16	Franco Gorostiaga	Paraguay	3.50/49/18.25	16		Did not advance
	Antonio Collazo	Argentina	–			

=== Men's tricks ===
Rank	Athlete	Nation	Preliminary round			Final
Rank	Athlete	Nation	Result	Rank	Notes	Final
1st place, gold medalist(s)	Martín Labra	Chile	12410	1	Q	12590
2nd place, silver medalist(s)	Matías González	Chile	12360	2	Q	12560
3rd place, bronze medalist(s)	Francisco Giorgis	Argentina	9140	3	Q	8990
4	Bautista Ahumada	Argentina	8860	4	Q	8830
5	Noé Osorio	Colombia	5400	6	Q	4450
6	Tobías Giorgis	Argentina	7400	5	Q	3060
7	Raúl Codas	Paraguay	4110	7		Did not advance
8	Pablo Alvira	Colombia	3970	8		Did not advance
9	Fernando Cáceres	Paraguay	1830	9		Did not advance
10	Diego Tejada	Peru	1810	10		Did not advance
11	Cristóbal Chocano	Peru	1340	11		Did not advance

=== Men's wakeboard ===
Rank	Athlete	Nation	Preliminary round				Last chance qualifier			Final
Rank	Athlete	Nation	Heat	Result	Rank	Notes	Result	Rank	Notes	Final
1st place, gold medalist(s)	Ulf Ditsch	Argentina	1	73.33	2	Q	—N/a			85.33
2nd place, silver medalist(s)	Kai Ditsch	Argentina	2	86.67	1	Q	—N/a			83.67
3rd place, bronze medalist(s)	Jorge Rocha	Colombia	1	76.00	1	Q	—N/a			74.33
4	Henrique Daibert	Brazil	1	63.00	3	L	75.33	1	Q	65.33
5	Giovanni Vigo	Paraguay	1	45.00	4	L	50.00	2	Q	50.00
6	Kord Holscher	Chile	2	33.67	2	Q	—N/a			36.00
7	Camilo Corrales	Paraguay	2	30.00	3	L	28.33	3		Did not advance

=== Women's jump ===
Rank	Athlete	Nation	Preliminary round			Final
Rank	Athlete	Nation	Result	Rank	Notes	Final
1st place, gold medalist(s)	Agustina Varas	Chile	41.3	1	Q	42.0
2nd place, silver medalist(s)	Martina Piedrahita	Colombia	32.6	=2	Q	33.3
3rd place, bronze medalist(s)	Daniela Verswyvel	Colombia	32.6	=2	Q	32.9
4	Isabella Besso	Argentina	31.8	4	Q	29.6
5	Tehri Gisler	Argentina	24.1	5	Q	23.8
6	Constanza Codas	Paraguay	19.0	7	Q	18.4
7	María Paulina Torres	Colombia	23.2	6		Did not advance
	Delfina Renosto	Argentina	–			
	Aleska Musiris	Peru	–			
	Valentina González	Chile	–			

=== Women's overall ===
Rank	Athlete	Nation	Preliminary round			
Rank	Athlete	Nation	Slalom	Tricks	Jump	Total
1st place, gold medalist(s)	Daniela Verswyvel	Colombia	850.57	1000.00	530.47	2381.04
2nd place, silver medalist(s)	Agustina Varas	Chile	873.56	455.06	1000.00	2328.62
3rd place, bronze medalist(s)	Dominga González	Chile	965.52	945.79		1911.31
4	Cristhiana de Osma	Peru	1000.00	865.91		1865.91
5	Terhi Gisler	Argentina	620.69	507.85	240.14	1368.68
6	Martina Piedrahita	Colombia	344.83	708.99	516.13	1225.12

=== Women's slalom ===
Rank	Athlete	Nation	Preliminary round			Final
Rank	Athlete	Nation	Result	Rank	Notes	Final
1st place, gold medalist(s)	Cristhiana de Osma	Peru	3.00/55/11.25	1	Q	3.00/55/11.25
2nd place, silver medalist(s)	Trinidad Espinal	Chile	1.00/55/11.25	2	Q	5.00/55/12.00
3rd place, bronze medalist(s)	Violeta Mociulsky	Argentina	3.00/55/12.00	3	Q	3.00/55/12.00
4	Dominga González	Chile	2.50/55/12.00	=8	Q	3.00/55/12.00
5	Daniela Verswyvel	Colombia	2.50/55/13.00	=8	Q	4.00/55/13.00
6	Delfina Renosto	Argentina	0.50/55/13.00	=13	Q	2.00/55/16.00
7	Agustina Varas	Chile	2.00/55/12.00	=11		Did not advance
8	Terhi Gisler	Argentina	3.00/55/14.25	=6		Did not advance
9	María Paulina Torres	Colombia	2.00/55/14.25	=11		Did not advance
10	Martina Piedrahita	Colombia	4.50/55/16.00	=4		Did not advance
11	Constanza Codas	Paraguay	4.50/55/18.25	4		Did not advance
12	Isabella Besso	Argentina	3.00/55/18.25	=6		Did not advance
13	Aleska Musiris	Peru	2.50/55/18.25	8		Did not advance
14	Valentina González	Chile	0.50/46/18.25	=13		Did not advance

=== Women's tricks ===
Rank	Athlete	Nation	Preliminary round			Final
Rank	Athlete	Nation	Result	Rank	Notes	Final
1st place, gold medalist(s)	Natalia Cuglievan	Peru	9800	1	Q	9080
2nd place, silver medalist(s)	Daniela Verswyvel	Colombia	8640	2	Q	8400
3rd place, bronze medalist(s)	Dominga González	Chile	6230	3	Q	6630
4	Delfina Renosto	Argentina	5240	6	Q	5520
5	Cristhiana de Osma	Peru	5910	4	Q	5470
6	María Paulina Torres	Colombia	5390	5	Q	3730
7	Martina Piedrahita	Colombia	5220	7		Did not advance
8	Terhi Gisler	Argentina	3560	8		Did not advance
9	Aleska Musiris	Peru	3370	9		Did not advance
10	Agustina Varas	Chile	3290	10		Did not advance
11	Isabella Besso	Argentina	1000	11		Did not advance
12	Constanza Codas	Paraguay	570	12		Did not advance
	Violeta Mociulsky	Argentina	–			
	Valentina González	Chile	–			

=== Women's wakeboard ===
Rank	Athlete	Nation	Preliminary round			Final
Rank	Athlete	Nation	Result	Rank	Notes	Final
1st place, gold medalist(s)	Eugenia de Armas	Argentina	85.67	1	Q	90.33
2nd place, silver medalist(s)	Ignacia Holscher	Chile	70.00	2	Q	79.00
3rd place, bronze medalist(s)	María Victoria de Armas	Argentina	64.33	3	Q	67.66
4	Mariana Nep	Brazil	62.67	4	Q	50.33
5	Luciana Toro	Colombia	50.00	5	Q	39.67
6	Victoria Manoiloff	Paraguay	35.00	6	Q	5.00
