= Artistic swimming at the 2026 South American Games =

Artistic swimming competitions at the 2026 South American Games

- Venue: Invencible Centro Acuático Provincial
- Dates: September 18–20
- Competitors: 56 from 8 nations

Artistic swimming competitions at the 2026 South American Games in Rosario, Santa Fe, and Rafaela, Argentina, were held between September 18 and 20 at Invencible Centro Acuático Provincial, located within Museo del Deporte Santafesino in Santa Fe.

A total of three events was contested, one more than the previous games. With the inclusion of male athletes to the competition, the events were re-structured into one female event (duet) and two mixed (duet and team). The games gave a qualifying quota to the best placed duet for the 2027 Pan American Games artistic swimming competitions.

== Medal summary ==
=== Medal table ===
* Host nation (Argentina)

Rank	Nation	Gold	Silver	Bronze	Total
1	Chile	3	0	0	3
2	Colombia	0	2	1	3
3	Brazil	0	1	2	3
Totals (3 entries)		3	3	3	9

=== Medalists ===
Event	Gold	Silver	Bronze
Duet	Soledad García; Trinidad García; Chile	Sara Castañeda; Melisa Ceballos; Colombia	Eduarda Chagas; Marina Postal; Brazil
Mixed duet	Nicolás Campos; Theodora Garrido; Chile	Anna França; Bernardo Santos; Brazil	Gustavo Sánchez; Emily Minante; Colombia
Mixed team	Chile; Nicolás Campos; Adriana Cerda; Bárbara Coppelli; Soledad García; Trinidad García; Theodora Garrido; Florencia Lazcano; Chloe Plaut; Eva Rubio; Macarena Vial	Colombia; Sara Castañeda; Melisa Ceballos; Tatiana Tobón; Luisa Botero; Gustavo Sánchez; Emily Minante; Isabella Franco; Laura Rodríguez; Juliana Pacheco; Valeria Jurado	Brazil; Ana Almeida; Ana Nunes; Anna França; Bernardo Barreto; Bernardo Santos; Celina Rangel; Eduarda Chagas; Hannah Sukman; Marina Postal; Sara Ribeiro

== Participation ==
Eight nations participated in the artistic swimming events of the 2026 South American Games.

- Argentina (10)
- Brazil (10)
- Chile (10)
- Colombia (10)
- Curaçao (2)
- Ecuador (2)
- Peru (2)
- Uruguay (10)

== Results ==
=== Duet ===
Rank	Name	Nation	Technical Routine	Free Routine	Total Points
1st place, gold medalist(s)	Soledad García; Trinidad García	Chile	252.6800	250.2659	502.9459
2nd place, silver medalist(s)	Sara Castañeda; Melisa Ceballos	Colombia	248.5250	250.3025	498.8275
3rd place, bronze medalist(s)	Eduarda Chagas; Marina Postal	Brazil	233.5825	231.4680	465.0505
4	Lia Luna; María Ccoyllo	Peru	230.6850	215.5025	446.1875
5	Agustina Medina; Lucía Ververis	Uruguay	235.1883	207.1814	442.3697
6	María Carasatorre; Tiziana Bonucci	Argentina	221.9492	215.9230	437.8722

=== Mixed duet ===
Rank	Name	Nation	Technical Routine	Free Routine	Total Points
1st place, gold medalist(s)	Nicolás Campos; Theodora Garrido	Chile	179.0150	250.4529	429.4679
2nd place, silver medalist(s)	Anna Franca; Bernardo Santos	Brazil	176.4892	195.5575	372.0467
3rd place, bronze medalist(s)	Gustavo Sánchez; Emily Minante	Colombia	119.6116	244.5100	364.1216
4	Yaqil Alberto; Ziva King	Curaçao	145.9958	153.7350	299.7308
5	Joaquín Espinoza; Ayelen Yépez	Ecuador	143.2750	149.7467	293.0217

=== Mixed team ===
Rank	Name	Nation	Technical Routine	Free Routine	Acrobatic Routine	Total Pointss
1st place, gold medalist(s)	Nicolás Campos; Adriana Cerda; Bárbara Coppelli; Soledad García; Trinidad García; Theodora Garrido; Florencia Lazcano; Chloe Plaut; Eva Rubio; Macarena Vial	Chile	233.8166	193.0800	197.1898	624.0864
2nd place, silver medalist(s)	Sara Castañeda; Melisa Ceballos; Tatiana Tobón; Luisa Botero; Gustavo Sánchez; Emily Minante; Isabella Franco; Laura Rodríguez; Juliana Pacheco; Valeria Jurado	Colombia	235.5233	196.5080	170.5867	602.6180
3rd place, bronze medalist(s)	Ana Almeida; Ana Nunes; Anna França; Bernardo Barreto; Bernardo Santos; Celina Rangel; Eduarda Chagas; Hannah Sukman; Marina Postal; Sara Ribeiro	Brazil	231.9008	190.5222	170.3014	592.7244
4	Martina Da Cunda; Paulina Altieri; Maite Alvarez; Ines Cabral; María Gagliardi; Martina Maisonaba; Agustina Medina; Julieta Oberti Díaz; Josefina Paris; Lucía Ververis	Uruguay	202.9687	164.1694	155.2246	522.3627
5	Milva Aimetta; Mercedes Romero; María Romagnoli; Valentina Ramírez; Morena Basso; María Carasatorre; Milena Bonucci; Iara Palacios; Tiziana Bonucci; María Rivero	Argentina	205.0417	156.7762	148.0866	509.9045
