= Racquetball at the 2026 South American Games =

Racquetball competitions at the 2026 South American Games

- Venue: Instituto Superior de Educación Física N° 11
- Dates: September 21–26
- Competitors: 26 from 5 nations

Racquetball competitions at the 2026 South American Games in Rosario, Santa Fe, and Rafaela, Argentina, were held between September 21 and 26 at Instituto Superior de Educación Física N° 11, located within Parque de la Independencia in Rosario.

Racquetball made its return to the games after being absent during the previous edition. A total of 7 events were contested (three men's, three women's and one mixed). A mixed doubles event was introduced. The games gave qualifying quotas to the gold-medal winning teams for the 2027 Pan American Games racquetball competitions.

== Medal summary ==
=== Medal table ===
* Host nation (Argentina)

Rank	Nation	Gold	Silver	Bronze	Total
1	Argentina*	4	3	1	8
2	Bolivia	3	4	1	8
3	Chile	0	0	7	7
4	Ecuador	0	0	5	5
Totals (4 entries)		7	7	14	28

=== Medalists ===
==== Men ====
Event	Gold	Silver	Bronze
Singles	Conrrado Moscoso; Bolivia	Jhonatan Flores; Bolivia	Diego García; Argentina
Singles	Conrrado Moscoso; Bolivia	Jhonatan Flores; Bolivia	Rodrigo Salgado Jr. Chile
Doubles	Conrrado Moscoso; Ismael Conrrado; Bolivia	Fernando Kurzbard; Diego García; Argentina	Rodrigo Salgado Jr. Francisco Troncoso; Chile
Doubles	Conrrado Moscoso; Ismael Conrrado; Bolivia	Fernando Kurzbard; Diego García; Argentina	José Daniel Ugalde; Juan Cueva; Ecuador
Team	Conrrado Moscoso; Jhonatan Flores; Ismael Conrrado; Bolivia	Fernando Kurzbard; Lautaro Cufré; Diego García; Argentina	Rodrigo Salgado Jr. Francisco Troncoso; Chile
Team	Conrrado Moscoso; Jhonatan Flores; Ismael Conrrado; Bolivia	Fernando Kurzbard; Lautaro Cufré; Diego García; Argentina	José Daniel Ugalde; Martín Carchi; Juan Cueva; Ecuador

==== Women ====
Event	Gold	Silver	Bronze
Singles	María José Vargas; Argentina	Natalia Méndez; Argentina	Camila Rivero; Bolivia
Singles	María José Vargas; Argentina	Natalia Méndez; Argentina	Carla Muñoz; Chile
Doubles	María José Vargas; Valeria Centellas; Argentina	Camila Rivero; Jenny Daza; Bolivia	María José Muñoz; María Villacreses; Ecuador
Doubles	María José Vargas; Valeria Centellas; Argentina	Camila Rivero; Jenny Daza; Bolivia	Paula Mansilla; Carla Muñoz; Chile
Team	María José Vargas; Natalia Méndez; Valeria Centellas; Argentina	Camila Rivero; Jenny Daza; Valeria Miranda; Bolivia	María José Muñoz; María Emilia Quinde; María Villacreses; Ecuador
Team	María José Vargas; Natalia Méndez; Valeria Centellas; Argentina	Camila Rivero; Jenny Daza; Valeria Miranda; Bolivia	Paula Mansilla; Carla Muñoz; Chile

==== Mixed ====
Event	Gold	Silver	Bronze
Doubles	Natalia Méndez; Diego García; Argentina	Jenny Daza; Jhonatan Flores; Bolivia	Carla Muñoz; Rodrigo Salgado Jr. Chile
Doubles	Natalia Méndez; Diego García; Argentina	Jenny Daza; Jhonatan Flores; Bolivia	María Villacreses; Martín Carchi; Ecuador

== Participation ==
Five nations participated in the racquetball events of the 2026 South American Games.

- Argentina (6)
- Bolivia (6)
- Chile (4)
- Ecuador (6)
- Peru (4)

== Results ==
=== Men's singles ===
Pool A

Rank	Athlete	Nation	Pld	W	L	Pts	Qualification
1	Conrrado Moscoso	Bolivia	2	2	0	4	Semifinals
2	José Daniel Ugalde	Ecuador	2	1	1	2	Quartefinals
3	Francisco Troncoso	Chile	2	0	2	0	

Pool B

Rank	Athlete	Nation	Pld	W	L	Pts	Qualification
1	Diego García	Argentina	2	2	0	4	Semifinals
2	Rodrigo Salgado Jr.	Chile	2	1	1	2	Quartefinals
3	Martín Carchi	Ecuador	2	0	2	0	

Pool C

Rank	Athlete	Nation	Pld	W	L	Pts	Qualification
1	Jhonatan Flores	Bolivia	3	3	0	6	Quartefinals
2	Lautaro Cufré	Argentina	3	2	1	4	Quartefinals
3	David Gonzales	Peru	3	1	2	2	
4	Kelby Arimana	Peru	3	0	3	0	

Knockout stage

Quarterfinals
4	(Bolivia) Jhonatan Flores	3
5	(Ecuador) José Daniel Ugalde	0
2	(Chile) Rodrigo Salgado Jr.	'3
7	(Argentina) Lautaro Cufré	0

Semifinals
(Bolivia) Jhonatan Flores	3
(Argentina) Diego García	2
(Bolivia) Conrrado Moscoso	3
(Chile) Rodrigo Salgado Jr.	0

Final
(Bolivia) Jhonatan Flores	0
(Bolivia) Conrrado Moscoso	3

=== Men's doubles ===
Rank	Athlete	Nation	Pld	W	L	Pts	Qualification
1	Conrrado Moscoso / Ismael Conrrado	Bolivia	4	4	0	8	Semifinals
2	José Daniel Ugalde / Juan Cueva	Ecuador	4	3	1	6	Semifinals
3	Fernando Kurzbard / Diego García	Argentina	4	2	2	4	Semifinals
4	Rodrigo Salgado Jr. / Francisco Troncoso	Chile	4	1	3	2	Semifinals
5	Kelby Arimana / David Gonzales	Peru	4	0	0	0	

Knockout stage

Semifinals
1	(Bolivia) Conrrado Moscoso (Bolivia) Ismael Conrrado	3
4	(Chile) Rodrigo Salgado Jr. (Chile) Francisco Troncoso	1
3	(Argentina) Fernando Kurzbard (Argentina) Diego García	3
2	(Ecuador) José Daniel Ugalde (Ecuador) Juan Cueva	2

Final
(Bolivia) Conrrado Moscoso (Bolivia) Ismael Conrrado	3
(Argentina) Fernando Kurzbard (Argentina) Diego García	2

=== Men's team ===
Knockout stage

Quarterfinals
4	Peru	0
5	Ecuador	2

Semifinals
Bolivia	2
Ecuador	0
Chile	0
Argentina	2

Final
Bolivia	2
Argentina	0

=== Women's singles ===
Pool A

Rank	Athlete	Nation	Pld	W	L	Pts	Qualification
1	María José Vargas	Argentina	2	2	0	4	Semifinals
2	María José Muñoz	Ecuador	2	1	1	2	Quartefinals
3	Paula Mansilla	Chile	2	0	2	0	

Pool B

Rank	Athlete	Nation	Pld	W	L	Pts	Qualification
1	Camila Rivero	Bolivia	2	2	0	4	Semifinals
2	Carla Muñoz	Chile	2	1	1	2	Quartefinals
3	María Emilia Quinde	Ecuador	2	0	2	0	

Pool C

Rank	Athlete	Nation	Pld	W	L	Pts	Qualification
1	Natalia Méndez	Argentina	3	3	0	6	Quartefinals
2	Valeria Miranda	Bolivia	3	2	1	4	Quartefinals
3	Kristen Hammerschmidt	Peru	3	1	2	2	
4	Chiara Molfino	Peru	3	0	3	0	

Knockout stage

Quarterfinals
4	(Argentina) Natalia Méndez	3
5	(Ecuador) María José Muñoz	0
2	(Chile) Carla Muñoz	0
7	(Bolivia) Valeria Miranda	3

Semifinals
(Argentina) Natalia Méndez	3
(Bolivia) Camila Rivero	2
(Argentina) María José Vargas	3
(Chile) Carla Muñoz	0

Final
(Argentina) Natalia Méndez	1
(Argentina) María José Vargas	3

=== Women's doubles ===
Rank	Athlete	Nation	Pld	W	L	Pts	Qualification
1	María José Vargas / Valeria Centellas	Argentina	4	4	0	8	Semifinals
2	Camila Rivero / Jenny Daza	Bolivia	4	3	1	6	Semifinals
3	Paula Mansilla / Carla Muñoz	Chile	4	2	2	4	Semifinals
4	María José Muñoz / María Villacredes	Ecuador	4	1	3	2	Semifinals
5	Kristen Hammerschmidt / Chriara Molfino	Peru	4	0	0	0	

Knockout stage

Semifinals
1	(Argentina) María José Vargas (Argentina) Valeria Centellas	3
4	(Ecuador) María José Muñoz (Ecuador) María Villacreses	1
3	(Bolivia) Camila Rivero (Bolivia) Jenny Daza	3
2	(Chile) Paula Mansilla (Chile) Carla Muñoz	2

Final
(Argentina) María José Vargas (Argentina) Valeria Centellas	3
(Bolivia) Camila Rivero (Bolivia) Jenny Daza	2

=== Women's team ===
Knockout stage

Quarterfinals
4	Peru	0
5	Ecuador	2

Semifinals
Argentina	2
Ecuador	0
Chile	0
Bolivia	2

Final
Argentina	2
Bolivia	0

=== Mixed doubles ===
Rank	Athlete	Nation	Pld	W	L	Pts	Qualification
1	Natalia Méndez / Diego García	Argentina	4	4	0	8	Semifinals
2	Jenny Daza / Jhonatan Flores	Bolivia	4	3	1	6	Semifinals
3	Martín Carchi / María Villacreses	Ecuador	4	2	2	4	Semifinals
4	Carla Muñoz / Rodrigo Salgado Jr.	Chile	4	1	3	2	Semifinals
5	Kristen Hammerschmidt / David Gonzales	Peru	4	0	0	0	

Knockout stage

Semifinals
1	(Argentina) Natalia Méndez (Argentina) Diego García	3
4	(Chile) Carla Muñoz (Chile) Rodrigo Salgado Jr.	0
3	(Bolivia) Jenny Daza (Bolivia) Jhonatan Flores	3
2	(Ecuador) María Villacreses (Ecuador) Martín Carchi	0

Final
(Argentina) Natalia Méndez (Argentina) Diego García	3
(Bolivia) Jenny Daza (Bolivia) Jhonatan Flores	0
