= Sport climbing at the 2026 South American Games =

Sport climbing competitions at the 2026 South American Games

Competition climbing at the 2026 South American Games
- Venue: Instituto Superior de Educación Física N° 27
- Dates: September 22–25
- Competitors: 66 from 7 nations

Competition climbing at the 2026 South American Games in Rosario, Santa Fe, and Rafaela, Argentina, was held between September 22 and 25 at Instituto Superior de Educación Física N° 27, located within Parque del Sur in Santa Fe.

Competition climbing made its debut at the games as one of the three new sports included for this edition, alongside cricket and surfing. A total of 6 events were contested (three men's and three women's) in the disciplines of lead climbing, bouldering and speed climbing. The games gave qualifying quotas for the 2027 Pan American Games competition climbing events.

== Medal summary ==
=== Medal table ===
* Host nation (Argentina)

Rank	Nation	Gold	Silver	Bronze	Total
1	Chile	2	2	4	8
2	Brazil	1	2	0	3
3	Ecuador	1	1	0	2
3	Venezuela	1	1	0	2
5	Argentina*	1	0	2	3
Totals (5 entries)		6	6	6	18

=== Medalists ===
==== Men ====
Event	Gold	Silver	Bronze
Boulder	Alejo Suter; Argentina	Benjamín Vargas; Chile	Joaquín Urrutia; Chile
Lead	Joaquín Urrutia; Chile	Felipe Ho; Brazil	Dante Caballero; Chile
Speed	Carlos Granja; Ecuador	Gustavo Pérez; Venezuela	Valentín Sternik; Argentina

==== Women ====
Event	Gold	Silver	Bronze
Boulder	Anja Kohler; Brazil	Martina Castro; Chile	María Aguado; Argentina
Lead	Martina Castro; Chile	Anja Kohler; Brazil	Matilde Cabezas; Chile
Speed	Sabrina Baumgartner; Venezuela	Valentina Flores; Ecuador	Anahí Riveros; Chile

== Participation ==
Seven nations participated in the competition climbing events of the 2026 South American Games.

- Argentina (13)
- Brazil (9)
- Chile (13)
- Colombia (3)
- Ecuador (3)
- Peru (10)
- Venezuela (15)

== Results ==
=== Men's boulder ===
Rank	Climber	Nation	Qualification					Final				
Rank	Climber	Nation	1	2	3	4	Total	1	2	3	4	Total
1st place, gold medalist(s)	Alejo Suter	Argentina	9.7	10.0	25.0	10.0	54.7 Q	25.0	25.0	25.0	9.9	84.9
2nd place, silver medalist(s)	Benjamín Vargas	Chile	24.7	10.0	24.9	25.0	84.6 Q	24.9	24.9	25.0	9.7	84.5
3rd place, bronze medalist(s)	Joaquín Urrutia	Chile	10.0	9.9	25.0	10.0	54.9 Q	24.7	25.0	10.0	10.0	69.7
4	Dante Caballero	Chile	10.0	0.0	25.0	25.0	60.0 Q	24.5	10.0	25.0	9.9	69.4
5	Felipe Ho	Brazil	0.0	9.8	25.0	25.0	59.8 Q	10.0	24.9	0.0	10.0	44.9
6	Rodrigo Iasi	Brazil	9.9	10.0	10.0	24.9	54.8 Q	24.9	10.0	0.0	10.0	44.9
7	Ariel Flores	Argentina	9.1	10.0	9.9	24.9	53.9 Q	25.0	9.7	0.0	10.0	44.7
8	Kenu Puerta	Peru	10.0	10.0	24.9	24.9	69.8 Q	10.0	9.7	9.9	9.7	39.3
9	Rafael Galindo	Venezuela	0.0	10.0	25.0	9.6	44.6	Did not advance				
10	Gianfranco Díaz	Venezuela	0.0	9.5	9.9	10.0	29.4	Did not advance				
=11	Yaku Gálmez	Peru	9.5	9.8	0.0	10.0	29.3	Did not advance				
=11	Gianstefano Di Nino	Venezuela	0.0	9.7	9.9	9.7	29.3	Did not advance				
13	Jerónimo Boque	Argentina	9.1	0.0	9.7	0.0	18.8	Did not advance				
14	Sebastián Mesías	Peru	0.0	0.0	0.0	9.8	9.8	Did not advance				

=== Men's lead ===
Rank	Climber	Nation	Qualification			Final	
Rank	Climber	Nation	Time	Score	Notes	Time	Score
1st place, gold medalist(s)	Joaquín Urrutia	Chile	3:52	42+	Q	3:38	36+
2nd place, silver medalist(s)	Felipe Ho	Brazil	2:58	34+	Q	2:59	29+
3rd place, bronze medalist(s)	Dante Caballero	Chile	3:23	34+	Q	2:38	28+
4	Alejo Suter	Argentina	2:15	27	Q	2:17	26+
5	Benjamín Vargas	Chile	2:50	32	Q	2:13	24+
6	Rafael Galindo	Venezuela	1:34	22+	Q	1:44	24+
7	Davi Peres	Brazil	2:46	33+	Q	1:50	21+
8	Gianstefano Di Nino	Venezuela	1:39	23+	Q	1:39	18+
9	Sebastián Mesías	Peru	2:08	21+		Did not advance	
10	Franco Medina	Argentina	1:57	21		Did not advance	
11	Jerónimo Boque	Argentina	1:32	19		Did not advance	

=== Men's speed ===
Qualification

Rank	Climber	Nation	Lane A	Lane B	Time	Notes
1	Carlos Granja	Ecuador	~~5.55~~	5.40	5.40	Q
2	Gustavo Pérez	Venezuela	5.45	~~5.64~~	5.45	Q
3	Valentín Sternik	Argentina	5.88	~~6.20~~	5.88	Q
4	Piero Luna	Ecuador	6.05	~~6.23~~	6.05	Q
5	Gianfranco Díaz	Venezuela	~~FALL~~	6.37	6.37	Q
6	Pedro Egg	Brazil	~~6.87~~	6.45	6.45	Q
7	Rafael Galindo	Venezuela	6.80	~~6.81~~	6.80	Q
8	Kenu Puerta	Peru	~~7.37~~	7.21	7.21	Q
9	Joaquín Tapia	Chile	~~FS~~	9.40	9.40	

Knockout stage

Quarterfinals
1	(Ecuador) Carlos Granja	5.55
8	(Peru) Kenu Puerta	7.86
4	(Ecuador) Piero Luna	13.14
5	(Venezuela) Gianfranco Díaz	6.31
2	(Argentina) Valentín Sternik	5.77
7	(Brazil) Pedro Egg	5.81
3	(Venezuela) Gustavo Pérez	5.59
6	(Venezuela) Rafael Galindo	6.29

Semifinals
(Ecuador) Carlos Granja	5.94
(Venezuela) Gianfranco Díaz	6.09
(Argentina) Valentín Sternik	5.80
(Venezuela) Gustavo Pérez	5.63

Final
(Ecuador) Carlos Granja	5.54
(Venezuela) Gustavo Pérez	7.76
Bronze medal match
(Venezuela) Gianfranco Díaz
(Argentina) Valentín Sternik	6.04

=== Women's boulder ===
Rank	Climber	Nation	Qualification					Final				
Rank	Climber	Nation	1	2	3	4	Total	1	2	3	4	Total
1st place, gold medalist(s)	Anja Kohler	Brazil	24.8	25.0	25.0	24.9	99.7 Q	25.0	25.0	9.8	9.9	69.7
2nd place, silver medalist(s)	Martina Castro	Chile	9.9	25.0	25.0	24.9	84.8 Q	24.9	24.9	10.0	9.6	69.4
3rd place, bronze medalist(s)	María Aguado	Argentina	24.7	24.8	24.9	25.0	99.4 Q	24.7	24.9	9.6	9.2	68.4
4	Marian Luna	Argentina	24.5	9.6	24.7	0.0	58.8 Q	10.0	24.9	0.0	9.9	44.8
5	Mariana Hanggi	Brazil	25.0		9.9	10.0	44.9 Q	9.8	24.4	0.0	9.6	43.8
6	Muykuay Silva	Chile	24.5	25.0	25.0	0.0	74.5 Q	9.1	24.8	0.0	9.7	43.6
7	Sara Noriega	Venezuela	24.8	24.8	24.6	0.0	74.2 Q	9.4	10.0	10.0	9.8	39.2
8	Malena Torrejón	Argentina	24.7	0.0	9.9	0.0	34.6 Q	9.8	10.0	0.0	9.8	29.6
9	Ainoa Hernández	Venezuela	24.5		9.7		34.2	Did not advance				
10	Tamara Ortiz	Peru	24.2	9.6	0.0	0.0	33.8	Did not advance				
11	Saray García	Colombia	10.0		9.9		19.9	Did not advance				
=12	Zoé Garrido	Peru	9.6				9.6	Did not advance				
=12	Silvana Leyton	Peru	9.6			0.0	9.6	Did not advance				
14	Camila Belandria	Venezuela	9.5				9.5	Did not advance				

=== Women's lead ===
Rank	Climber	Nation	Qualification			Final	
Rank	Climber	Nation	Time	Score	Notes	Time	Score
1st place, gold medalist(s)	Martina Castro	Chile	5:04	TOP	Q	4:29	TOP
2nd place, silver medalist(s)	Anja Kohler	Brazil	4:36	TOP	Q	4:52	TOP
3rd place, bronze medalist(s)	Matilde Cabezas	Chile	3:43	40+	Q	4:40	36+
4	María Aguado	Argentina	2:51	37	Q	2:52	32+
5	Sara Noriega	Venezuela	4:36	38	Q	2:33	28+
6	Muykuay Silva	Chile	3:15	32+	Q	2:07	27+
7	María Herrera	Argentina	2:56	28+	Q	2:29	27+
8	Mariana Hanggi	Brazil	2:50	28+	Q	2:06	24+
9	Saray García	Colombia	3:00	22+		Did not advance	
10	Marian Luna	Argentina	2:35	21		Did not advance	
11	Silvana Leyton	Peru	1:35	15		Did not advance	
12	Zoé Garrido	Peru	1:40	13+		Did not advance	
13	Camila Belandria	Venezuela	0:54	12+		Did not advance	

=== Women's speed ===
Qualification

Rank	Climber	Nation	Lane A	Lane B	Time	Notes
1	Sabrina Baumgartner	Brazil	~~12.15~~	7.92	7.92	Q
2	Anahí Riveros	Chile	~~FS~~	8:04	8:04	Q
3	Valentina Flores	Ecuador	~~8:82~~	8.76	8.76	Q
4	Ainoa Hernández	Venezuela	~~FS~~	9.97	9.97	Q
5	María Sánchez	Colombia	10.86	~~FALL~~	10.86	

Knockout stage

Semifinals
1	(Venezuela) Sabrina Baumgartner	7.85
4	(Venezuela) Ainoa Hernández	23.40
3	(Chile) Anahí Riveros	8.34
2	(Ecuador) Valentina Flores	8.23

Final
(Venezuela) Sabrina Baumgartner	7.65
(Ecuador) Valentina Flores	8.50
Bronze medal match
(Venezuela) Ainoa Hernández	10.85
(Chile) Anahí Riveros	7.79
