= Modern pentathlon at the 2026 South American Games =

Modern pentathlon competitions at the 2026 South American Games

- Venue: Estadio Municipal Jorge Newbery
- Dates: September 14–18
- Competitors: 37 from 8 nations

Modern pentathlon competitions at the 2026 South American Games in Rosario, Santa Fe, and Rafaela, Argentina, were held between September 14 and 18 at Estadio Municipal Jorge Newbery, located within Parque de la Independencia in Rosario.

Modern pentathlon made make its return to the games after being absent during the previous edition. A total of 5 events were contested (two men's, two women's and one mixed). Two gendered relay events were added.

== Medal summary ==
=== Medal table ===
* Host nation (Argentina)

Rank	Nation	Gold	Silver	Bronze	Total
1	Ecuador	3	1	2	6
2	Argentina*	1	2	0	3
3	Venezuela	1	1	2	4
4	Brazil	0	1	1	2
Totals (4 entries)		5	5	5	15

=== Medalists ===
Event	Gold	Silver	Bronze
Men's individual	Bayardo Naranjo; Ecuador	João Victor Acioly; Brazil	Albert Rivas; Venezuela
Men's relay	Ecuador; Bayardo Naranjo; Andrés Torres	Venezuela; Albert Rivas; Neiverson Quintana	Brazil; João Victor Acioly; Rômulo Bandeira
Women's individual	Catalina Serio; Argentina	Sol Naranjo; Ecuador	Luciana Aroca; Ecuador
Women's relay	Ecuador; Luciana Aroca; Sol Naranjo	Argentina; Martina Armanazqui; Nerea Luna	Venezuela; Osmaidy Arias; Ariana Vivenes
Mixed relay	Venezuela; Albert Rivas; Osmaidy Arias	Argentina; Franco Serrano; Catalina Serio	Ecuador; Bayardo Naranjo; Sol Naranjo

== Participation ==
Eight nations participated in the modern pentathlon events of the 2026 South American Games.

- Argentina (6)
- Bolivia (4)
- Brazil (5)
- Chile (3)
- Ecuador (6)
- Peru (3)
- Uruguay (4)
- Venezuela (6)

== Results ==
=== Men's individual ===
Rank	Athlete	Nation	Fencing Victories (pts)	Swimming Time (pts)	Obstacle Time (pts)	Laser run Time (pts)	Score
1st place, gold medalist(s)	Bayardo Naranjo	Ecuador	12 (250)	00:57.31 (314)	00:21.93 (380)	11:05 (645)	1579
2nd place, silver medalist(s)	João Victor Acioly	Brazil	14 (218)	00:57.40 (313)	00:24.74 (371)	10:28 (672)	1574
3rd place, bronze medalist(s)	Albert Rivas	Peru	18 (236)	00:57.87 (311)	00:26.12 (367)	10:45 (655)	1569
4	Franco Serrano	Argentina	15 (238)	00:55.62 (322)	00:31.72 (350)	10:55 (645)	1555
5	Andrés Torres	Ecuador	13 (244)	00:53.12 (335)	00:26.24 (367)	11:35 (605)	1551
6	Romulo Neto	Brazil	8 (208)	00:54.64 (327)	00:29.86 (356)	11:01 (639)	1530
7	Isaac Hernández	Ecuador	8 (212)	00:58.50 (308)	00:30.94 (353)	10:58 (642)	1515
8	Vicente Valderrama	Chile	8 (228)	01:02.80 (286)	00:35.69 (338)	10:43 (657)	1509
9	Vladimir Dovichi	Argentina	8 (226)	00:56.83 (316)	00:29.32 (358)	11:37 (603)	1503
10	Martín Gajardo	Chile	10 (230)	00:56.36 (319)	00:30.84 (353)	11:42 (598)	1500
11	Nelson Espeleta	Argentina	7 (204)	01:00.38 (299)	00:29.73 (356)	11:01 (639)	1498
12	Renzo Cifuentes	Peru	7 (198)	00:57.38 (314)	00:30.47 (354)	11:27 (613)	1479
13	Neiverson Quintana	Venezuela	7 (206)	01:05.13 (275)	00:28.31 (361)	11:12 (628)	1470
14	Rainer Arias	Venezuela	8 (210)	00:56.40 (318)	00:41.70 (320)	11:50 (590)	1438
15	Jair Samame	Peru	7 (224)	01:02.55 (288)	00:30.80 (353)	12:14 (566)	1431
16	Francesco Chumacero	Bolivia	9 (214)	01:04.18 (280)	00:43.09 (316)	11:52 (588)	1398
17	Ticiano Castro	Uruguay	6 (196)	01:08.33 (259)	00:44.87 (311)	12:06 (574)	1340
18	Emiliano Silva	Uruguay	12 (216)	01:01.57 (293)	01:13.81 (224)	13:10 (510)	1243
19	Juan Diego Mamani	Bolivia	4 (216)	01:01.67 (292)	01:16.20 (217)	15:09 (391)	1116
20	Matheus Nobre	Brazil	12 (244)	01:00.16 (300)	EL	DNF	544

=== Men's relay ===
Rank	Athlete	Nation	Fencing Victories (pts)	Swimming Time (pts)	Obstacle Time (pts)	Laser run Time (pts)	Score
1st place, gold medalist(s)	Bayardo Naranjo; Andrés Torres	Ecuador	28 (244)	00:49.19 (355)	00:49.10 (358)	12:47 (533)	1490
2nd place, silver medalist(s)	Neiverson Quintana; Albert Rivas	Venezuela	23 (250)	00:55.38 (324)	00:51.88 (350)	12:29 (551)	1475
3rd place, bronze medalist(s)	Romulo Neto; João Victor Acioly	Brazil	19 (238)	00:50.78 (347)	01:06.79 (305)	12:03 (577)	1467
4	Jair Samame; Renzo Cifuentes	Peru	18 (236)	00:53.92 (331)	01:06.60 (306)	12:33 (547)	1420
5	Nelson Espeleta; Vladimir Dovichi	Argentina	14 (228)	00:52.45 (338)	00:58.54 (330)	12:57 (523)	1419
6	Emiliano Silva; Ticiano Romero	Uruguay	7 (226)	00:56.30 (319)	EL	14:32 (428)	973
7	Francesco Chumacero; Juan Diego Mamani	Bolivia	16 (230)	00:58.48 (308)	EL	15:22 (378)	916

=== Women's individual ===
Rank	Athlete	Nation	Fencing Victories (pts)	Swimming Time (pts)	Obstacle Time (pts)	Laser run Time (pts)	Score
1st place, gold medalist(s)	Catalina Serio	Argentina	24 (244)	01:02.93 (286)	00:34.24 (343)	12:49 (531)	873
2nd place, silver medalist(s)	Lucianna Aroca	Ecuador	20 (236)	01:07.04 (265)	00:30.28 (355)	13:07 (513)	856
3rd place, bronze medalist(s)	Nerea Luna	Argentina	19 (228)	01:02.99 (286)	00:43.97 (314)	12:53 (527)	828
4	Martina Armanazqui	Argentina	19 (230)	01:04.27 (279)	00:48.53 (300)	12:50 (530)	809
5	Osmaidy Arias	Venezuela	14 (212)	01:03.94 (281)	00:43.93 (314)	13:15 (505)	807
6	Isabela Abreu	Brazil	17 (226)	01:04.43 (278)	00:48.04 (301)	13:15 (505)	805
7	Giraly Marcano	Venezuela	14 (224)	01:07.10 (265)	00:43.69 (314)	14:16 (444)	803
8	Sol Naranjo	Ecuador	19 (250)	01:11.79 (242)	00:45.74 (308)	12:10 (570)	800
9	Ariana Vivenes	Venezuela	13 (210)	01:10.12 (250)	00:42.03 (319)	13:27 (493)	779
10	Nicole Farias	Brazil	11 (208)	01:08.34 (259)	00:56.49 (276)	12:00 (580)	743
11	Lorena Isaías	Peru	3 (204)	01:06.79 (267)	01:17.42 (213)	14:10 (450)	684
12	Britney Maurell	Uruguay	11 (206)	01:27.56 (163)	01:08.85 (239)	13:54 (466)	608
13	Victoria Gerlach	Uruguay	19 (218)	01:09.91 (251)	01:45.61 (129)	13:12 (508)	598
14	Dara Salazar	Ecuador	25 (238)	01:00.55 (298)	EL	13:30 (490)	536
15	Jeiny Cerda	Bolivia	6 (198)	01:07.79 (262)	EL	15:51 (349)	460
16	María José Bravo	Chile	18 (216)	01:12.56 (238)	EL	12:45 (535)	454
17	Mariela Ayala	Bolivia	15 (214)	01:32.94 (136)	EL	14:34 (426)	350

=== Women's relay ===
Rank	Athlete	Nation	Fencing Victories (pts)	Swimming Time (pts)	Obstacle Time (pts)	Laser run Time (pts)	Score
1st place, gold medalist(s)	Lucianna Aroca; Sol Naranjo	Ecuador	21 (250)	01:01.25 (294)	01:14.49 (282)	14:35 (425)	1251
2nd place, silver medalist(s)	Nerea Luna; Martina Armanazqui	Argentina	21 (244)	00:58.01 (310)	01:29.50 (237)	14:32 (428)	1219
3rd place, bronze medalist(s)	Ariana Vivenes; Osmaidy Arias	Venezuela	12 (236)	00:59.32 (304)	01:23.41 (255)	15:30 (370)	1165
4	Isabela Abreu; Nicole Faria	Brazil	15 (238)	00:59.72 (302)	01:46.26 (187)	15:28 (372)	1099
5	Britney Maurell; Victoria Gerlach	Uruguay	11 (230)	01:09.93 (251)	02:36.03 (37)	16:30 (310)	828

=== Mixed relay ===
Rank	Athlete	Nation	Fencing Victories (pts)	Swimming Time (pts)	Obstacle Time (pts)	Laser run Time (pts)	Score
1st place, gold medalist(s)	Osmaidy Arias; Albert Rivas	Venezuela	22 (238)	00:54.44 (238)	01:06.31 (307)	13:12 (508)	1381
2nd place, silver medalist(s)	Catalina Serio; Franco Serrano	Argentina	27 (250)	00:52.60 (337)	01:04.20 (313)	13:39 (481)	1381
3rd place, bronze medalist(s)	Sol Naranjo; Bayardo Naranjo	Ecuador	23 (244)	00:57.55 (313)	01:09.41 (297)	13:10 (510)	1364
4	Nicole Faria; Romulo Neto	Brazil	16 (230)	00:56.60 (317)	01:36.62 (216)	12:51 (529)	1292
5	Lorena Isaías; Renzo Cifuentes	Peru	13 (228)	00:54.82 (326)	01:28.93 (239)	14:47 (413)	1206
6	María José Bravo; Vicente Valderrama	Chile	16 (236)	01:00.24 (299)	01:44.44 (192)	13:43 (477)	1204
7	Victoria Gerlach; Ticiano Romero	Uruguay	9 (226)	EL	02:20.62 (84)	14:30 (430)	740
