= 2026 South American Games =

Multi-sport event in Santa Fe, Argentina

XIII South American Games
- Host city: Rosario, Santa Fe, and Rafaela
- Country: Argentina
- Motto: Esta tierra te vuelve invencible (English: This land makes you invincible)
- Nations: 15
- Events: 447 in 43 sports (60 disciplines)
- Opening: 12 September 2026
- Closing: 26 September 2026
- Opened by: Governor Maximiliano Pullaro
- Main venue: National Flag Memorial (opening); Parque del Sur FanFest Stage (closing)

The XIII South American Games (Spanish: XIII Juegos Suramericanos Santa Fe 2026) were a multi-sport event held between 12 and 26 September 2026 in Rosario, Santa Fe, and Rafaela, Argentina. It is the third time the Games have taken place in the country after the 1982 Games in Rosario and the 2006 Games in Buenos Aires.

The Games were organized by the South American Sports Organization, the Argentine Olympic Committee, the government of the Argentine Republic and the local provincial government. Many of the events were part of the qualification system for the 2027 Pan American Games, set to be held in Lima, Peru.

== Opening ceremony ==
The opening ceremony took place at National Flag Memorial in Rosario and featured musical performances from Soledad Pastorutti, Abel Pintos, Juan Carlos Baglietto, Luck Ra, Cacho Deicas, Valentino Merlo, and Agustín Rada Aristarán. Pastorutti also composed the games' official song "Late el Sur".

== Participating nations ==
The number of athletes entered by a NOC is in parentheses:

- Argentina (638) (host)
- Aruba (13)
- Bolivia (220)
- Brazil (468)
- Chile (523)
- Colombia (405)
- Curaçao (17)
- Ecuador (180)
- Guyana (31)
- Panama (87)
- Paraguay (337)
- Peru (468)
- Suriname (13)
- Uruguay (336)
- Venezuela (374)

== Sports ==
A total of 43 sports were contested, 26 of them are in the program of the 2027 Pan American Games, and gave nominal places for the event. The sports of sport climbing and surfing made their debuts. Basque pelota, modern pentathlon, racquetball and softball returned after not being included for the previous edition of the Games. Namely, softball was last included at the 2010 Games. Previously held as demonstration sports, esports and padel were included as official sports for the first time. Basketball, bodybuilding, beach soccer and futsal were dropped from this year's program. Chess, billiards and mixed martial arts were contested as exhibition/demonstration sports. Cricket was planned, but was dropped in August 2026 due to a lack of participating teams.

- Aquatics
  - Artistic swimming (3)
  - Diving (6)
  - Open water swimming (2)
  - Swimming (41)
  - Water polo (2)
- Archery (10)
- Athletics (44)
- Badminton (6)
- Basque pelota (6)
- Bocce (4)
- Bowling (4)
- Boxing (12)
- Canoeing
  - Canoe sprint (16)
  - Slalom canoeing (8)
- Cycling
  - BMX freestyle (2)
  - BMX racing (2)
  - Mountain biking (2)
  - Road cycling (4)
  - Track cycling (12)
- Equestrian
  - Dressage (2)
  - Eventing (2)
  - Jumping (2)
- Esports (4)
- Fencing (12)
- Field hockey (2)
- Football (2)
- Golf (3)
- Gymnastics
  - Artistic gymnastics (14)
  - Rhythmic gymnastics (8)
  - Trampoline (5)
- Handball (2)
- Judo (17)
- Karate (12)
- Modern pentathlon (5)
- Padel (2)
- Racquetball (7)
- Roller sports
  - Artistic roller skating (4)
  - Skateboarding (2)
  - Inline speed skating (10)
- Rowing
  - Coastal rowing (5)
  - Rowing (17)
- Rugby sevens (2)
- Sailing (7)
- Shooting (15)
- Softball (2)
- Sport climbing (6)
- Squash (7)
- Surfing (10)
- Table tennis (7)
- Taekwondo (12)
- Tennis (5)
- Triathlon (3)
- Volleyball
  - Beach volleyball (2)
  - Volleyball (2)
- Water skiing (10)
- Weightlifting (16)
- Wrestling
  - Freestyle wrestling (12)
  - Greco-Roman wrestling (6)

== Calendar ==
The schedule was as follows:

OC	Opening ceremony	●	Event competitions	1	Gold medal events	CC	Closing ceremony

Sports		September															Events
Sports		12th Sat	13th Sun	14th Mon	15th Tue	16th Wed	17th Thu	18th Fri	19th Sat	20th Sun	21st Mon	22nd Tue	23rd Wed	24th Thu	25th Fri	26th Sat	Events
Ceremonies		OC														CC	—N/a
Aquatics	Artistic swimming							●	2	1							3
Aquatics	Diving		1	1	2	2											6
Aquatics	Open water swimming		2														2
Aquatics	Swimming		12	12	10	7											41
Aquatics	Water polo										●	●	●	●	●	2	2
Archery												●	4	●	6		10
Athletics												9	12	13	12		46
Badminton											●	1	●	●	●	5	6
Basque pelota										●	●	●	●	6			6
Bocce				●	●	1	3										4
Bowling					●	●	2	●	2								4
Boxing			●	●	●	●	●	14									14
Canoeing	Slalom												●	2	6		8
Canoeing	Sprint												6	6	4		16
Cycling	BMX freestyle			●	2												2
Cycling	BMX racing					●	2										2
Cycling	Mountain biking			2													2
Cycling	Road cycling				2			2									4
Cycling	Track cycling									4	2	2	4				12
Equestrian	Dressage		●	1		1											2
Equestrian	Eventing							●	●	2							2
Equestrian	Jumping												●	1		1	2
Esports			●	3	●	2											5
Fencing			2	2	2	2	2	2									12
Field hockey			●	●	●	●	●	●	●	●	●	2					2
Football						●	●	●	●	●	●		1		1		2
Golf					●	●	●	3									3
Gymnastics	Artistic gymnastics		2	2	5	5											14
Gymnastics	Rhythmic gymnastics							●	1	2	5						8
Gymnastics	Trampoline								●	●	5						5
Handball						●	●	●	●	1		●	●	●	●	1	2
Judo								8	8	2							18
Karate													4	4	4		12
Modern pentathlon				●	●	2	2	1									5
Padel												●	●	●	2		2
Racquetball											●	●	●	5	●	2	7
Roller sports	Artistic			●	4												4
Roller sports	Skateboarding							●	2								2
Roller sports	Speed			4	4	2											10
Rowing	Coastal rowing											●	5				5
Rowing	Rowing				●	6	6	5									17
Rugby sevens								●	●	2							2
Sailing						●	●	●	●	7							7
Shooting					2	3	1	2	4	3							15
Softball					●	●	●	●	1		●	●	●	●	1		2
Sport climbing												1	1	2	2		6
Squash											●	●	2	3	●	2	7
Surfing					2	2			●	●	●	●	●	●	6		10
Table tennis											●	1	4	●	●	2	7
Taekwondo													4	4	4		12
Tennis											●	●	●	●	3	2	5
Triathlon						2		1									3
Volleyball	Beach volleyball		●	●	●	●	2										2
Volleyball	Volleyball				●	●	●	●	1		●	●	●	●	1		2
Water skiing								●	2	8							10
Weightlifting				4	4	4	4										16
Wrestling									6	6	6						18
Daily medal events			20	33	40	41	24	38	30	37	18	16	47	46	52	17	459
Cumulative total			20	53	93	134	158	196	226	263	281	297	344	390	442	459	459
Sports		12th Sat	13th Sun	14th Mon	15th Tue	16th Wed	17th Thu	18th Fri	19th Sat	20th Sun	21st Mon	22nd Tue	23rd Wed	24th Thu	25th Fri	26th Sat	Total events
Sports		September															Total events

== Venues ==
Most of the events took place across different venues in Rosario, Santa Fe, and Rafaela. Additionally, softball took place in Paraná, while Munro, a city of Vicente López Partido in Greater Buenos Aires, hosted bowlingand surfing events were held in Mar del Plata.

City	Cluster	Venue	Events
Santa Fe	Parque del Sur	Centro de Alto Rendimiento Deportivo	Athletics
Santa Fe	Parque del Sur	Estadio de la Asociación Santafesina de Hockey	Field hockey
Santa Fe	Parque del Sur	Instituto Superior de Educación Física N° 27	Sport climbing
Santa Fe	Parque del Sur	Invencible Santa Fe	Handball
Santa Fe	Parque del Sur	Lago Sur	Open water swimming
Santa Fe	Parque del Sur	Lago Sur	Slalom canoeing
Santa Fe	Parque del Sur	Lago Sur	Water skiing
Santa Fe	Parque del Sur	FanFest Stage	Closing ceremony
Santa Fe	Estación Belgrano		Bocce
Santa Fe	Laguna Setúbal	Costanera Este	Rowing
Santa Fe	Laguna Setúbal	Costanera Este	Triathlon
Santa Fe	Laguna Setúbal	Costanera Este	Canoeing
Santa Fe	Laguna Setúbal	Club de Niños Manuel Belgrano	Coastal rowing
Santa Fe	Laguna Setúbal	Club de Niños Manuel Belgrano	Sailing
Santa Fe	Museo del Deporte Santafesino	Invencible Centro Acuático Provincial	Artistic swimming
Santa Fe	Museo del Deporte Santafesino	Invencible Centro Acuático Provincial	Diving
Santa Fe	Museo del Deporte Santafesino	Invencible Centro Acuático Provincial	Swimming
Santa Fe	Museo del Deporte Santafesino	Invencible Centro Acuático Provincial	Water polo
Santa Fe	Museo del Deporte Santafesino	Asociación Rosarina de Fútbol [es]	Football (women's)
Santa Fe	Recreo	Invencible Centro Internacional de Tiro Deportivo	Shooting
Rosario	Parque de la Independencia	Estadio Marcelo Bielsa	Football (men's)
Rosario	Parque de la Independencia	Estadio Salvador Bonilla	Fencing
Rosario	Parque de la Independencia	Estadio Salvador Bonilla	Table tennis
Rosario	Parque de la Independencia	Estadio Claudio Newell	Volleyball
Rosario	Parque de la Independencia	Estadio Municipal Jorge Newbery	Modern pentathlon
Rosario	Parque de la Independencia	Instituto Superior de Educación Física N° 11	Badminton
Rosario	Parque de la Independencia	Instituto Superior de Educación Física N° 11	Racquetball
Rosario	Parque de la Independencia	Invencible Rosario	Judo
Rosario	Parque de la Independencia	Invencible Rosario	Karate
Rosario	Parque de la Independencia	Invencible Rosario	Artistic roller skating
Rosario	Parque de la Independencia	Invencible Arena	Gymnastics
Rosario	Parque de la Independencia	Rural Picadero	Beach volleyball
Rosario	Parque de la Independencia	Patinódromo Municipal	Inline speed skating
Rosario	Parque de la Independencia	Hipódromo	Archery
Rosario	Parque de la Independencia	Hipódromo	Tennis
Rosario	Parque de la Independencia	Hipódromo	Rugby sevens
Rosario	Parque de la Independencia	Rural Nave B	Taekwondo
Rosario	Parque de la Independencia	Rural Nave B	Wrestling
Rosario	Parque de la Independencia	Gimnasio N° 5	Weightlifting
Rosario	Parque de la Independencia	Rural Nave C	Squash
Rosario	Parque a la Bandera	Club Gimnasia y Esgrima	Basque pelota (trinquete)
Rosario	Parque a la Bandera	National Flag Memorial	Opening ceremony
Rosario	Parque a la Bandera	National Flag Memorial	Basque pelota (fronton and frontball)
Rosario	Jockey Club de Rosario		Equestrian
Rosario	Rosario Golf Club		Golf
Rosario	Mercado del Patio	L2 Arena	Esports
Rafaela	Eco Parque	BMX Park	BMX freestyle
Rafaela	Eco Parque	BMX Race	BMX racing
Rafaela	Eco Parque	Invencible Velódromo	Track cycling
Rafaela	Eco Parque	Skate Park	Skateboarding
Rafaela	Autódromo Ciudad de Rafaela	Circuito MTB	Mountain biking
Rafaela	Distrito Joven	Estadio Invencible Rafaela	Boxing
Rafaela	Distrito Joven	Estadio Invencible Rafaela	Padel
Rafaela	NR 34 [es]	Circuito Ruta	Road cycling
Mar del Plata	Playa Grande		Surfing
Paraná	Estadio Mundialista de Sóftbol		Softball
Munro	Norcenter		Bowling

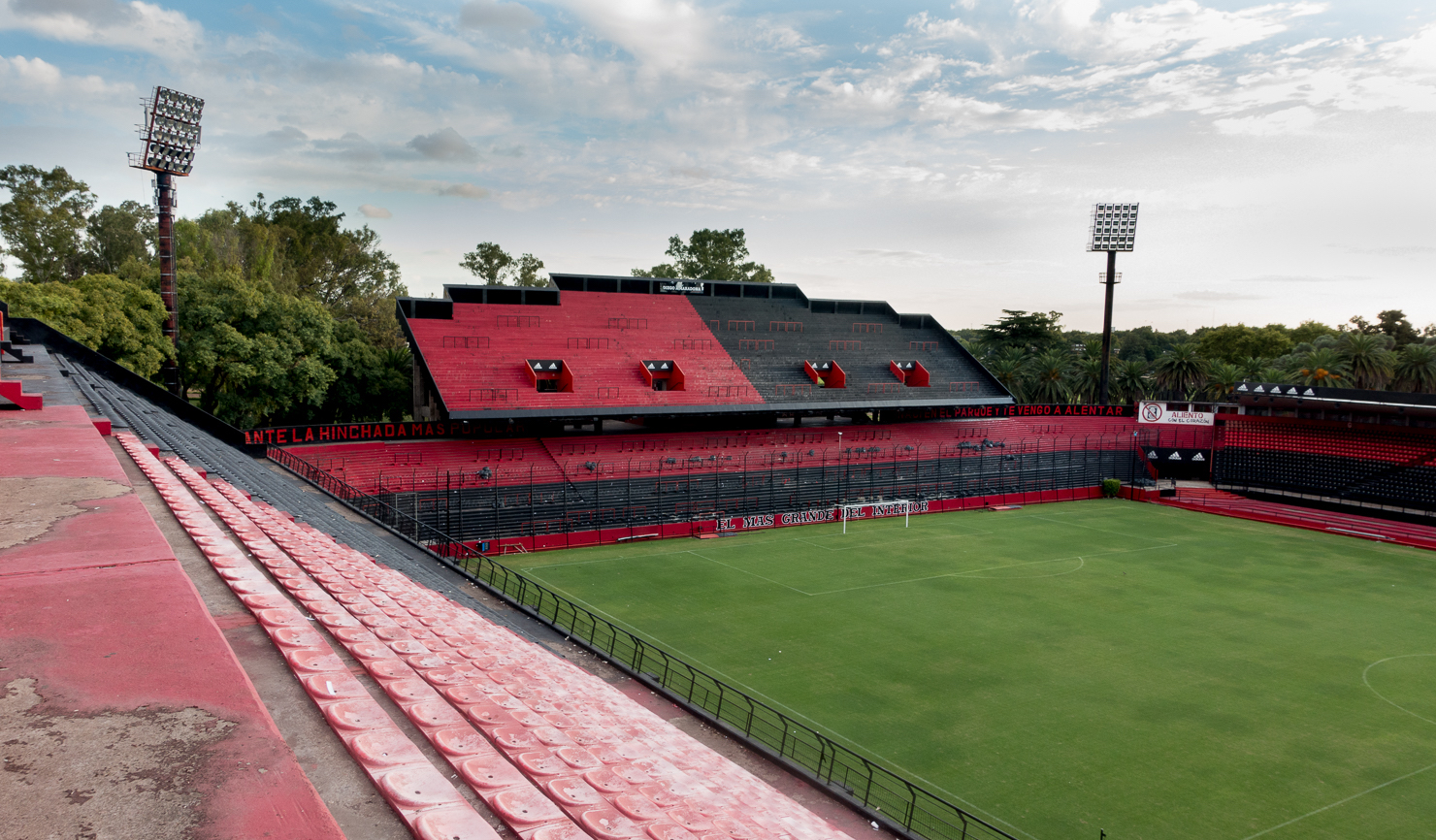
Estadio Marcelo Bielsa (men's football)

Estadio Asociación Rosarina (women's football)

Estadio Asociación Santafesina (field hockey)

Invencible Centro Acuático Provincial (swimming)

Invencible Santa Fe (handball)

Invencible Velódromo (cycling)

Norcenter Munro (bocce)

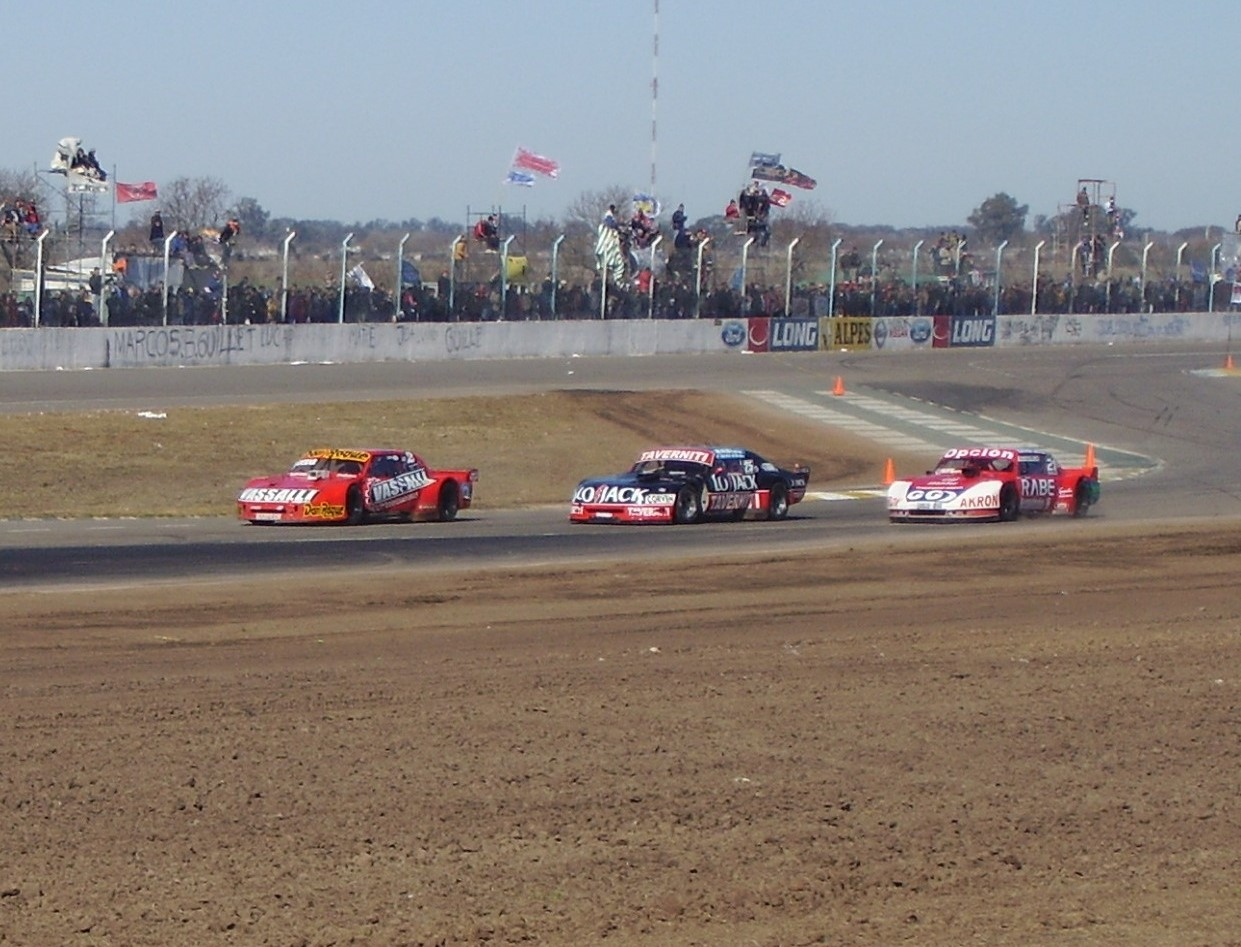
Autódromo de Rafaela (mountain biking)

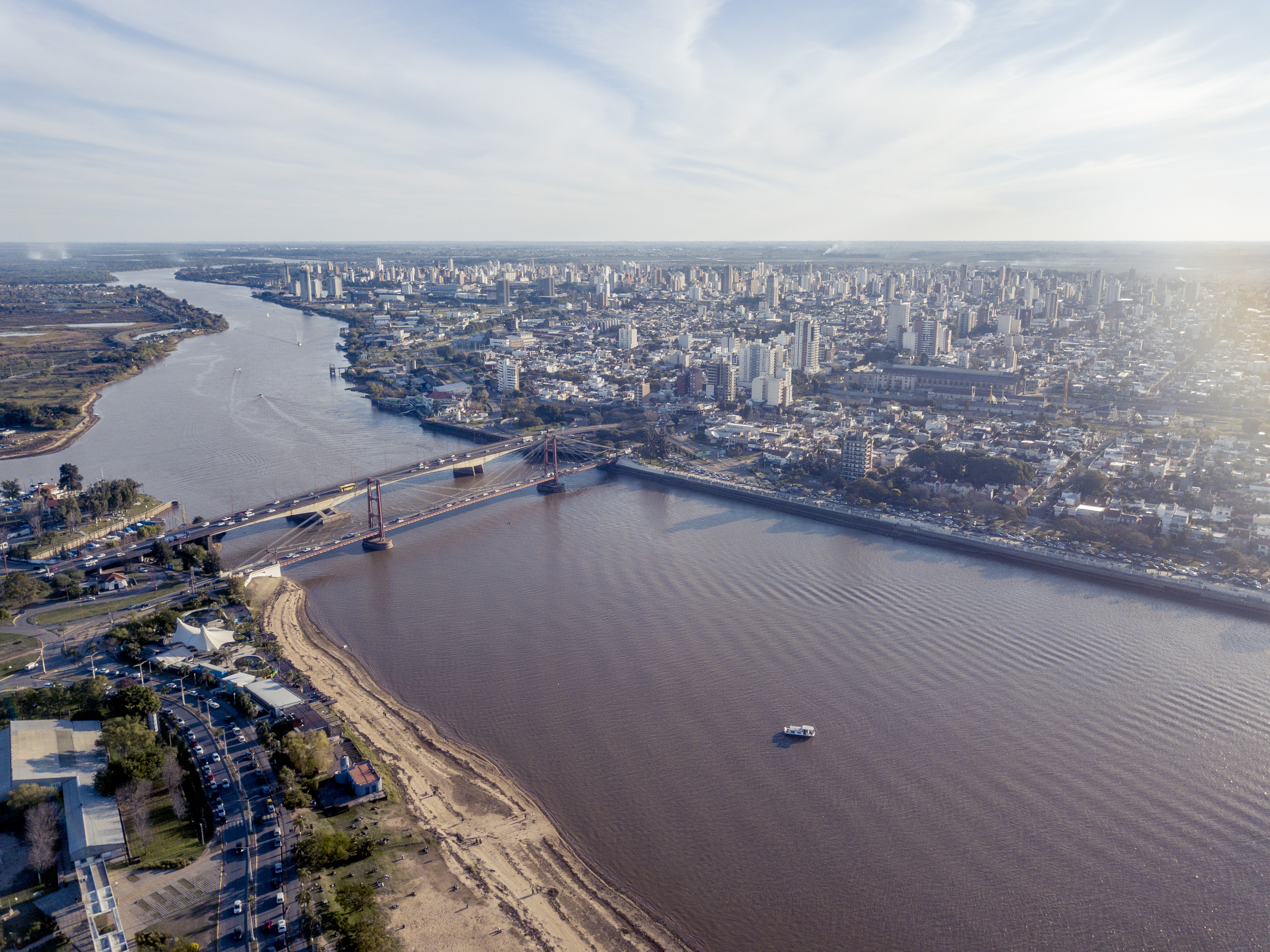
Laguna Setúbal, Santa Fe (rowing, triathlon, and sailing)

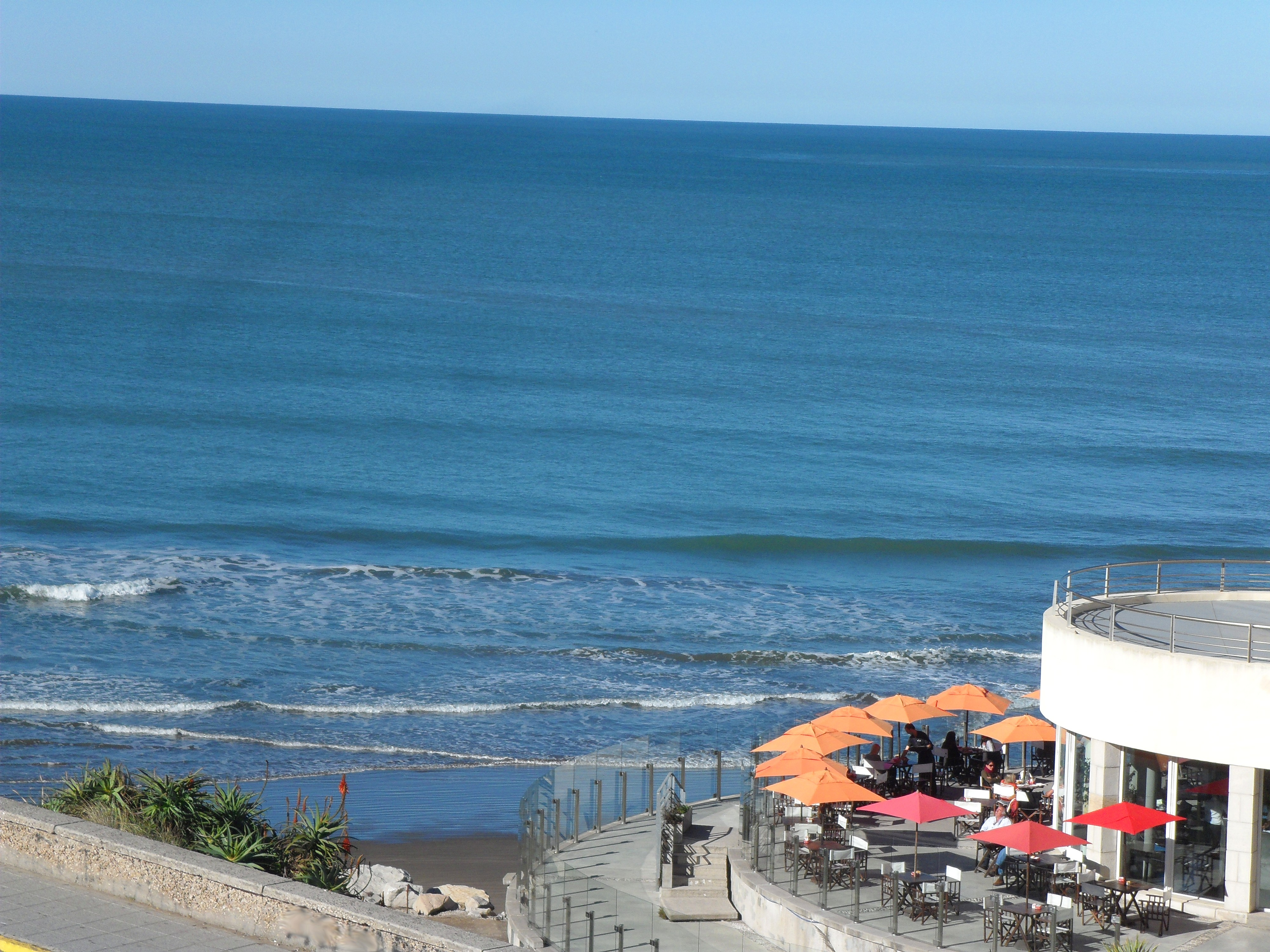
Playa Grande, Mar del Plata (surfing)

== Medal table ==
* Host nation (Argentina)

Rank	Nation	Gold	Silver	Bronze	Total
1	Brazil (BRA)	122	107	83	312
2	Argentina (ARG)*	81	87	125	293
3	Colombia (COL)	69	61	62	192
4	Chile (CHI)	49	58	68	175
5	Venezuela (VEN)	48	43	55	146
6	Peru (PER)	28	32	39	99
7	Uruguay (URU)	17	14	23	54
8	Ecuador (ECU)	16	27	39	82
9	Paraguay (PAR)	9	9	19	37
10	Panama (PAN)	5	3	8	16
11	Bolivia (BOL)	3	4	9	16
12	Curaçao (CUW)	1	0	1	2
13	Aruba (ARU)	0	3	1	4
14	Guyana (GUY)	0	0	4	4
Totals (14 entries)		448	448	536	1,432
