= Softball at the 2026 South American Games =

Baseball competitions at the 2026 South American Games

- Venue: Estadio Mundialista Ingeniero Nafaldo Cargnel
- Dates: September 15–25

Softball tournaments at the 2026 South American Games in Rosario, Santa Fe, and Rafaela, Argentina, were held between September 15 and 25 at the Estadio Mundialista Ingeniero Nafaldo Cargnel, located in Paraná.

Softball make their return to the games, after being last included in the 2010 South American Games, held in Medellín, Colombia. The team that wins the gold medal in the women's tournament qualied to the Americas WBSC Qualifying Event, set to take place in 2027, as a part of the qualification route for the softball tournament at the 2028 Summer Olympics.

== Participating nations ==
A total of six ODESUR nations participated in the softball events, with teams of 15 players for each tournament.

- Argentina (30)
- Bolivia (28)
- Brazil (14)
- Colombia (14)
- Peru (29)
- Venezuela (29)

== Medal summary ==
=== Medal table ===
* Host nation (Argentina)

Rank	Nation	Gold	Silver	Bronze	Total
1	Venezuela	2	0	0	2
2	Argentina*	0	1	1	2
3	Brazil	0	1	0	1
4	Peru	0	0	1	1
Totals (4 entries)		2	2	2	6

=== Medalists ===
Event	Gold	Silver	Bronze
Men's tournament	Venezuela; Sebastián Silvera; Alvi Paredes; Luis Colombo; Ángel Adames; David Galeno; Jean Flores; Engelbert Herrera; José Dorantes; Kleiver Rodríguez; Erwin Díaz; Juan Pereira; Eduardo Juárez; Yanluis Núñez; José Blanco; Clevelan Santeliz	Argentina; Matías Etchevers; Federico Olheiser; Teo Migliavacca; Franco Ortellado; Federico Eder; Lucio Retamar; Fausto Siviero; Franco Saenz; Manuel Godoy; Luciano Biondi; Francisco Lombardo; Alejo Muñoz; Alán Peker; Pablo Migliavacca; Khalil Luna	Peru; Gonzalo Sakuda; Ian Takaesu; Kevin Areche; Daniel Ramírez; Joaquín Pando; Maikor Ventura; Geyni Silva; Bruno Casanova; Gonzalo Guimet; Sergio Oshiro; Fabricio Pando; Luis Montero; Stefano Huancas; Diego Riquelme; Juan Cabrera
Women's tournament	Venezuela; Yulexis Barrios; Loreley Francia; Valentina Linares; Daryelin Rivas; Yusneiby Acacio; Kendal Lunar; Bailey Olerich; Eila Infante; Verónica Antequera; Yakary Molina; Irene Rabasco; Jairimar Pulido; Sarah Willis; Michelle Floyd	Brazil; Gabriela Nishiuchi; Caroline Mito; Emanueli da Silva; Gabriela Mit Luz; Samira Tanaka; Bárbara Woll; Maria Ueno; Fernanda Shiroma; Beatriz Narazaki; Thalia Vieira da Silva; Mariana Ribeiro Pereira; Mayra Akamine; Veronica Puckett; Amanda Handa	Argentina; Abigail Barboza; María Grimolizzi; Aldana Gómez; Juliana Martínez; María Salguero; Emiliana Gumpel; Carolina Asato; Mariana Gorosito; Keila Luna; Agustina Bonetti; María Bonetti; Isabel Malarkey; Violeta Figueroa; Carina Amarilla; Jasmine Armenteros
