= Surfing at the 2026 South American Games =

Surfing competitions at the 2026 South American Games

- Venue: Playa Grande
- Dates: September 15–25
- Competitors: 78 from 10 nations

Surfing competitions at the 2026 South American Games in Rosario, Santa Fe, and Rafaela, Argentina, were held between September 15 and 25 at Playa Grande in Mar del Plata.

Surfing made its debut at the games as one of the three new sports included for this edition, alongside cricket and sport climbing. A total of 10 events were contested (five men's and five women's). The games gave qualifying quotas for the 2027 Pan American Games surfing competitions.

== Medal summary ==
=== Medal table ===
* Host nation (Argentina)

Rank	Nation	Gold	Silver	Bronze	Total
1	Argentina*	6	5	3	14
2	Peru	1	3	1	5
3	Brazil	1	0	3	4
4	Panama	1	0	0	1
4	Uruguay	1	0	0	1
6	Chile	0	2	0	2
7	Venezuela	0	0	2	2
8	Colombia	0	0	1	1
Totals (8 entries)		10	10	10	30

=== Medalists ===
==== Men ====
Event	Gold	Silver	Bronze
Bodyboard	Edwin Núñez; Panama	Moisés Silva; Chile	Sergio Alonzo; Venezuela
Longboard	Julián Schweizer; Uruguay	Sebastián Cárdenas; Peru	Matías Maturano; Argentina
Shortboard	Joaquín Muñoz; Argentina	Thiago Passeri; Argentina	Francisco Bellorín; Venezuela
SUP sprint racing	Santino Basaldella; Argentina	Itzel Delgado; Peru	Ignacio Arias; Argentina
SUP technical racing	Santino Basaldella; Argentina	Itzel Delgado; Peru	Ignacio Arias; Argentina

==== Women ====
Event	Gold	Silver	Bronze
Bodyboard	Isabella Assmann; Argentina	Valentina Díaz; Chile	Beatriz Arleo; Colombia
Longboard	Chloe Calmon; Brazil	Evelyn Gontier; Argentina	María Fernanda Reyes; Peru
Shortboard	Catalina Zariquiey; Peru	Victoria Muñoz; Argentina	Silvana Lima; Brazil
SUP sprint racing	Juliette Duhaime; Argentina	Lucía Clembosky; Argentina	Jessika Matos; Brazil
SUP technical racing	Juliette Duhaime; Argentina	Alma Coletta; Argentina	Jessika Matos; Brazil

== Participation ==
Ten nations participated in the surfing events of the 2026 South American Games.

- Argentina (14)
- Brazil (6)
- Chile (8)
- Colombia (8)
- Ecuador (5)
- Panama (6)
- Paraguay (1)
- Peru (19)
- Uruguay (3)
- Venezuela (8)

== Results ==
=== Men's bodyboard ===
==== Main round ====
Round 1
(Venezuela) David Duarte	9.50
(Peru) Lucciano Campos	8.86
(Venezuela) Sergio Alonzo	13.16
(Peru) Ronald Gómez	9.34
(Panama) Edwin Núñez	9.78
(Argentina) Emiliano Tabare	9.67
(Colombia) Leison Jiménez	8.73
(Ecuador) José Rosero	7.80

Round 2
(Chile) Matías Díaz	5.00
(Chile) Moisés Silva	9.90
(Venezuela) David Duarte	13.07
(Venezuela) Sergio Alonzo	15.33
(Panama) Edwin Núñez	10.00
(Colombia) Leison Jiménez	8.67

Round 3
(Chile) Moisés Silva	10.70
(Venezuela) Sergio Alonzo	13.33
(Panama) Edwin Núñez	11.53

Round 4
(Venezuela) Sergio Alonzo	13.10
(Panama) Edwin Núñez	13.17

==== Repechage ====
Round 1
(Peru) Lucciano Campos	9.13
(Peru) Ronald Gómez	6.07
(Ecuador) José Rosero	8.00
(Argentina) Emiliano Tabare	3.97

Round 2
(Venezuela) David Duarte	13.07
(Peru) Lucciano Campos	7.10
(Colombia) Leison Jiménez	9.44
(Ecuador) José Rosero	8.13

Round 3
(Chile) Matías Díaz	16.30
(Venezuela) David Duarte	13.93
(Colombia) Leison Jiménez	7.60

Round 4
(Venezuela) David Duarte	11.83
(Chile) Matías Díaz	5.43

Round 5
(Chile) Moisés Silva	13.47
(Venezuela) David Duarte	12.84

==== Final stage ====
Bronze medal match
(Chile) Moisés Silva	14.86
(Venezuela) Sergio Alonzo	12.83

Gold medal match
(Panama) Edwin Núñez	10.33
(Chile) Moisés Silva	4.50

=== Men's longboard ===
==== Main round ====
Round 1
(Chile) Rafael Cortéz	11.73
(Brazil) Carlos Oliveira	11.50
(Peru) Sebastián Cárdenas	10.57
(Argentina) Surfiel Gil	13.50
(Peru) Benoit Clemente	12.64
(Panama) Agustín Cedeño	9.07
(Argentina) Matías Maturano	13.20
(Uruguay) Julián Schweizer	10.60
(Chile) José Boza	8.60

Round 2
(Peru) Benoit Clemente	11.94
(Uruguay) Julián Schweizer	9.50
(Chile) Rafael Cortéz	5.80
(Argentina) Surfiel Gil	10.93
(Argentina) Matías Maturano	9.67
(Brazil) Carlos Oliveira	9.46

Round 3
(Argentina) Matías Maturano	13.40
(Peru) Benoit Clemente	11.83
(Uruguay) Julián Schweizer	12.27
(Argentina) Surfiel Gil	10.16

Round 4
(Argentina) Matías Maturano	8.40
(Uruguay) Julián Schweizer	15.13

==== Repechage ====
Round 1
(Peru) Sebastián Cárdenas	8.50
(Chile) José Boza	5.57
(Panama) Agustín Cedeño	5.26

Round 2
(Peru) Sebastián Cárdenas	11.56
(Chile) Rafael Cortéz	9.50
(Brazil) Carlos Oliveira	9.60
(Chile) José Boza	8.93

Round 3
(Peru) Sebastián Cárdenas	16.00
(Peru) Benoit Clemente	13.93

Round 4
(Peru) Sebastián Cárdenas	12.56
(Brazil) Carlos Oliveira	11.33

==== Final stage ====
Bronze medal match
(Peru) Sebastián Cárdenas	13.94
(Argentina) Matías Maturano	12.33

Gold medal match
(Uruguay) Julián Schweizer	14.13
(Peru) Sebastián Cárdenas	13.00

=== Men's shortboard ===
==== Main round ====
Round 1
(Colombia) Kahlil Piñeres	WD
(Argentina) Thiago Passeri	1
(Ecuador) Bruce Burgos	9.67
(Chile) Manuel Selman	6.70
(Ecuador) Alex Suárez	15.00
(Chile) Noel de la Torre	9.17
(Argentina) Joaquín Muñoz	8.37
(Uruguay) Martín Ottado	7.03
(Venezuela) Francisco Bellorín	8.66
(Venezuela) Wulgen Rodríguez	5.83
(Peru) Lucas Pérez	10.84
(Panama) Jean González	9.67
(Peru) Alejandro Bernales	11.00
(Colombia) Romeo Chávez	6.87

Round 2
(Argentina) Thiago Passeri	17.50
(Ecuador) Bruce Burgos	12.44
(Ecuador) Alex Suárez	3.77
(Argentina) Joaquín Muñoz	14.83
(Venezuela) Francisco Bellorín	11.17
(Brazil) Yage Fernandes	8.77
(Peru) Lucas Pérez	8.90
(Peru) Alejandro Bernales	11.07

Round 3
(Argentina) Thiago Passeri	11.44
(Argentina) Joaquín Muñoz	12.76
(Venezuela) Francisco Bellorín	12.67
(Peru) Alejandro Bernales	11.13

Round 4
(Argentina) Joaquín Muñoz	12.13
(Venezuela) Francisco Bellorín	11.67

==== Repechage ====
Round 1
(Chile) Noel de la Torre	14.97
(Uruguay) Martín Ottado	10.43
(Colombia) Romeo Chávez	10.43
(Panama) Jean González	10.23

Round 2
(Ecuador) Bruce Burgos	9.17
(Chile) Manuel Selman	8.67
(Chile) Noel de la Torre	11.90
(Ecuador) Alex Suárez	7.60
(Brazil) Yage Fernandes	10.13
(Venezuela) Wuigen Rodríguez	6.50
(Colombia) Romeo Chávez	8.33
(Peru) Lucas Perez	6.06

Round 3
(Ecuador) Bruce Burgos	9.93
(Chile) Noel de la Torre	7.00
(Brazil) Yage Fernandes	5.17
(Colombia) Romeo Chávez	14.34

Round 4
(Argentina) Thiago Passeri	13.67
(Ecuador) Bruce Burgos	13.23
(Peru) Alejandro Bernales	12.30
(Colombia) Romeo Chávez	9.93

Round 5
(Argentina) Thiago Passeri	16.34
(Peru) Alejandro Bernales	9.33

==== Final stage ====
Bronze medal match
(Argentina) Thiago Passeri	15.50
(Venezuela) Francisco Bellorín	11.20

Gold medal match
(Argentina) Joaquín Muñoz	10.17
(Argentina) Thiago Passeri	9.33

=== Men's SUP sprint racing ===
Rank	Athlete	Nation	Semifinals				Final
Rank	Athlete	Nation	Heat	Time	Rank	Notes	Final
1st place, gold medalist(s)	Santino Basaldella	Argentina	2	56.46	1	Q	55.92
2nd place, silver medalist(s)	Itzel Delgado	Peru	2	57.39	1	Q	57.95
3rd place, bronze medalist(s)	Ignacio Arias	Argentina	2	56.95	2	Q	59.67
4	Rober Córdoba	Colombia	1	59.79	4	Q	1:34.12
5	Luiz de Castro	Brazil	1	1:00.67	3		Did not advance
6	Edonays Caballero	Panama	2	1:05.11	3		Did not advance
7	Adrián Calvo	Peru	1	1:08.18	4		Did not advance
8	Darío González	Colombia	2	1:08.53	4		Did not advance

=== Men's SUP technical racing ===
Rank	Athlete	Nation	Final				
Rank	Athlete	Nation	Final	1st place, gold medalist(s)	Santino Basaldella	Argentina	18:43.37
2nd place, silver medalist(s)	Itzel Delgado	Peru	18:46.74				
3rd place, bronze medalist(s)	Ignacio Arias	Argentina	19:13.35				
4	Luiz de Castro	Brazil	20:12.25				
5	Edonays Caballero	Panama	20:33.65				
6	Rober Córdoba	Colombia	20:47.95				
7	Andrés Rodríguez	Peru	20:50.26				
8	Darío González	Colombia	21:30.23				

=== Women's bodyboard ===
==== Main round ====
Round 1
(Colombia) Beatriz Arleo	8.47
(Peru) Solange Calderón	4.87
(Argentina) Isabella Assmann	10.67
(Venezuela) Emily Hurtado	4.60
(Chile) Valentina Díaz	10.03
(Venezuela) Rosmarky Álvarez	4.67
(Panama) Verónica Correa	10.50
(Peru) Chiara Olcese	5.10

Round 2
(Colombia) Beatriz Arleo	6.27
(Argentina) Isabella Assmann	11.17
(Chile) Valentina Díaz	9.80
(Panama) Verónica Correa	4.50

Round 3
(Argentina) Isabella Assmann	8.77
(Chile) Valentina Díaz	2.37

==== Repechage ====
Round 1
(Peru) Solange Calderón	4.66
(Venezuela) Emily Hurtado	2.50
(Peru) Chiara Olcese	7.40
(Venezuela) Rosmarky Álvarez	5.26

Round 2
(Colombia) Beatriz Arleo	12.33
(Peru) Solange Calderón	9.83
(Peru) Chiara Olcese	9.47
(Panama) Verónica Correa	7.53

Round 3
(Colombia) Beatriz Arleo	9.40
(Peru) Chiara Olcese	5.27

==== Final stage ====
Bronze medal match
(Chile) Valentina Díaz	8.86
(Colombia) Beatriz Arleo	7.80

Gold medal match
(Chile) Valentina Díaz	7.90
(Argentina) Isabella Assmann	9.13

=== Women's longboard ===
==== Main round ====
Round 1
(Peru) María Fernanda Reyes	12.50
(Uruguay) Inés Beisso	8.90
(Peru) Noelia Arata	5.97
(Colombia) Margarita Conde	5.94
(Brazil) Chloe Calmon	13.06
(Argentina) Evelyn Gontier	6.77

Round 2
(Brazil) Chloe Calmon	9.76
(Peru) María Fernanda Reyes	7.17
(Peru) Noelia Arata	2.23

Round 3
(Brazil) Chloe Calmon	12.07
(Peru) María Fernanda Reyes	10.00

==== Repechage ====
Round 1
(Uruguay) Inés Beisso	5.97
(Argentina) Evelyn Gontier	5.83
(Colombia) Margarita Conde	3.14

Round 2
(Uruguay) Inés Beisso	7.30
(Argentina) Evelyn Gontier	8.10

Round 3
(Peru) Noelia Arata	7.94
(Argentina) Evelyn Gontier	10.23

==== Final stage ====
Bronze medal match
(Argentina) Evelyn Gontier	8.97
(Peru) María Fernanda Reyes	6.84

Gold medal match
(Brazil) Chloe Calmon	15.84
(Argentina) Evelyn Gontier	8.40

=== Women's shortboard ===
==== Main round ====
Round 1
(Colombia) Margarita Conde	WD
(Peru) Sofía Artieda	W
(Chile) Isidora Fernández	W
(Peru) Catalina Zariquiey	DNS
(Ecuador) Dominic Barona	7.33
(Ecuador) Génesis Borja	2.40
(Argentina) Victoria Muñoz	7.83
(Venezuela) Rosanny Álvarez	5.30
(Argentina) Lucía Indurain	11.93
(Venezuela) Luna Marcano	4.76

Round 2
(Brazil) Silvana Lima	9.20
(Peru) Sofía Artieda	4.44
(Chile) Isidora Fernández	9.84
(Ecuador) Dominic Barona	9.00
(Argentina) Victoria Muñoz	14.34
(Argentina) Lucía Indurain	7.94

Round 3
(Brazil) Silvana Lima	10.70
(Chile) Isidora Fernández	7.80
(Argentina) Victoria Muñoz	11.60

Round 4
(Brazil) Silvana Lima	1.90
(Argentina) Victoria Muñoz	9.23

==== Repechage ====
Round 1
(Venezuela) Rosanny Álvarez	8.60
(Venezuela) Luna Marcano	4.03
(Peru) Catalina Zariquiey	12.10
(Ecuador) Génesis Borja	1.93

Round 2
(Venezuela) Rosanny Álvarez	4.07
(Argentina) Lucía Indurain	2.84
(Peru) Catalina Zariquiey	12.83
(Ecuador) Dominic Barona	5.93

Round 3
(Peru) Sofía Artieda	13.27
(Peru) Catalina Zariquiey	12.77
(Venezuela) Rosanny Álvarez	4.46

Round 4
(Peru) Sofía Artieda	10.67
(Peru) Catalina Zariquiey	11.56

==== Final stage ====
Bronze medal match
(Peru) Catalina Zariquiey	13.50
(Brazil) Silvana Lima	4.87

Gold medal match
(Peru) Catalina Zariquiey	8.97
(Argentina) Victoria Muñoz	5.04

=== Women's SUP sprint racing ===
Rank	Athlete	Nation	Semifinals				Final
Rank	Athlete	Nation	Heat	Time	Rank	Notes	Final
1st place, gold medalist(s)	Juliette Duhaime	Argentina	2	1:09.23	1	Q	1:03.72
2nd place, silver medalist(s)	Lucía Clembosky	Argentina	1	1:15.02	1	Q	1:04.31
3rd place, bronze medalist(s)	Jessika Matos	Brazil	2	1:13.81	2	Q	1:11.91
4	Mariajose Gómez	Peru	1	1:23.23	2	Q	1:20.33
5	Stephanie Bodden	Panama	2	1:16.51	3		Did not advance
6	Danilsa de Oro	Colombia	2	1:24.81	4		Did not advance
	Zoe Martín	Peru	1	DNS			Did not advance

=== Women's SUP technical racing ===
Rank	Athlete	Nation	Final				
Rank	Athlete	Nation	Final	1st place, gold medalist(s)	Juliette Duhaime	Argentina	20:28.80
2nd place, silver medalist(s)	Alma Coletta	Argentina	21:49.20				
3rd place, bronze medalist(s)	Jessika Matos	Brazil	21:51.50				
4	Giannisa Vecco	Peru	22:01.69				
5	Stephanie Bodden	Panama	22:03.25				
6	Emilia Ezcurra	Peru	22:34.20				
7	Danilsa de Oro	Colombia	24:24.03				
