= Archery at the 2027 Pan American Games – Qualification =

The following is the qualification system and qualified athletes, countries and teams for the Archery at the 2027 Pan American Games competitions.

== Qualification system ==
A total of 102 archers will qualify to compete at the games (51 per gender). A country may enter a maximum of ten archers (five per gender). As host nation, Peru qualifies eight athletes automatically (3 for the men's and women's recurve event each, 1 for the men's and women's compound event each).

The present Qualification System has been designed to ensure 8 recurve teams and 6 compound teams of each gender, as well as the participation of individual archers from as many countries as possible. For this reason, a country can qualify either a 3-archers team or just one archer.

As provided for the Olympic Games, a country cannot participate with two archers in one category for Lima, except if one of the archers qualified at the Pan American Junior Games in Asunción.

As there are countries (Colombia, Venezuela, Panama and Guyana) whose geographical location allows them to compete at the South American Games and the Central American and Caribbean Games, their National Federations must inform World Archery Americas by March 31, 2026, in which of these two Games they want to be considered for Pan American Games qualifying positions. This information must be provided in writing and must be accompanied by a letter of approval of their respective National Olympic Committee.

As Canada and the United States do not compete in any of the Regional Games, they will be the only countries eligible to earn spots in the North American Qualifier.

=== Recurve ===
A country may enter a maximum of three recurve athletes per gender (for a maximum of six total). As host, Peru automatically receives three quotas per gender. At the first qualification tournament, the top five teams in the team event qualify along with three individuals per gender. At the second qualification tournament, the top two teams along with two individuals will qualify per gender. If a country that won an individual quota(s) at the first tournament, wins a team quota at the second tournament, those individual spots will be reallocated to the second qualification individual event.

=== Compound ===
A country may enter a maximum of two compound athletes per gender (for a maximum of four total). As host, Peru automatically receives one quota per gender. The top four two-member teams in the first qualification tournament will qualify along with one individual per gender. At the second qualification tournament, the top two teams along with one individual will qualify per gender. If a country that won an individual quota at the first tournament, wins a team quota at the second tournament, that individual spot will be reallocated to the second qualification individual event.

== Qualification timeline ==
Events	Date	Venue
2025 Junior Pan American Games	10–12 August 2025	(Paraguay) Asunción
Pan American Archery Championship	23–28 June 2026	(Mexico) Tlaxcala
North American Qualifier	23–28 June 2026	(Mexico) Tlaxcala
2026 Central American and Caribbean Games	23 – 26 July 2026	(Dominican Republic) Santo Domingo
2026 South American Games	21–25 September 2026	(Argentina) Santa Fe
TBC	April 2027	TBC

== Qualification summary ==
Nation	Men				Women				Mixed		Total
Nation	I. recurve	T. recurve	I. compound	T. compound	I. recurve	T. recurve	I. compound	T. compound	T. recurve	T. compound	Athletes
Argentina	1				1						2
Brazil	3	X	2		4	X			X		9
Canada	1				1				X		2
Chile	3	X									3
Colombia	3	X	2	X	3	X	2	X	X	X	10
Cuba	1				1						2
Dominican Republic							1				1
Ecuador					1		1				2
El Salvador	1		1				1			X	3
Guatemala	1		2	X	3	X			X		6
Mexico	3	X	2	X	3	X	2	X	X	X	10
Peru	3	X	1		3	X	1		X	X	8
Puerto Rico	1		1				2	X		X	4
United States	3	X	2	X	3	X	2	X	X	X	10
Venezuela					1		1				2
Total: 17 NOCs	33	8	18	6	33	8	18	6	15	8	102

== Recurve men ==
Event	Qualified	Archers per NOC	Total
Host nation	Peru	3	3
2025 Junior Pan American Games	Guatemala	1	1
Pan American Archery Championship	United States; Colombia; Chile; Mexico; Brazil	3	15
Pan American Archery Championship	Cuba; Canada; El Salvador	1	3
North American Qualifier	—N/a	0	0
2026 Central American and Caribbean Games	Puerto Rico	1	1
2026 South American Games	Argentina	1	1
Qualification event		3	6
Qualification event		1	~~2~~ 3
TOTAL			33

== Recurve women ==
Event	Qualified	Archers per NOC	Total
Host nation	Peru	3	3
2025 Junior Pan American Games	Brazil	1	1
Pan American Archery Championship	United States; Mexico; Brazil; Colombia; Guatemala	3	15
Pan American Archery Championship	Canada; Argentina; Venezuela	1	3
North American Qualifier	—N/a	0	0
2026 Central American and Caribbean Games	Cuba	1	1
2026 South American Games	Ecuador	1	1
Qualification event		3	6
Qualification event		1	~~2~~ 3
TOTAL			33

== Compound men ==
Event	Qualified	Archers per NOC	Total
Host nation	Peru	1	1
2025 Junior Pan American Games	Brazil	1	1
Pan American Archery Championship	United States; Colombia; Mexico; Guatemala	2	8
Pan American Archery Championship	El Salvador	1	1
2026 Central American and Caribbean Games	Puerto Rico	1	1
2026 South American Games	Brazil	1	1
Qualification event		2	4
Qualification event		1	1
TOTAL			18

== Compound women ==
Event	Qualified	Archers per NOC	Total
Host nation	Peru	1	1
2025 Junior Pan American Games	Ecuador	1	1
Pan American Archery Championship	Mexico; Colombia; United States; Puerto Rico	2	8
Pan American Archery Championship	El Salvador	1	1
2026 Central American and Caribbean Games	Dominican Republic	1	1
2026 South American Games	Venezuela	1	1
Qualification event		2	4
Qualification event		1	1
TOTAL			18
