= Squash at the 2027 Pan American Games – Qualification =

The following are the qualification system and qualified countries for the Squash at the 2027 Pan American Games competition in Lima, Peru.

== Qualification system ==
A total of 74 squash athletes (37 men and 37 women) will qualify to compete. Each nation may enter a maximum of 6 athletes (three per gender), except for the NOCs that have qualified in Asuncion 2025. The host nation, Peru automatically qualified the maximum team size. Other ten men's and women's teams (of three athletes) qualified through the 2026 Pan American Championships.

== Qualification timeline ==
Event	Date	Venue
2025 Junior Pan American Games	August 11–16, 2025	(Paraguay) Asuncion
2026 Pan American Squash Championships	August 15–22, 2026	(Paraguay) Asuncion
North American Ranking	August 22, 2026	—N/a
2026 Central American and Caribbean Games	August 2–7, 2026	(Dominican Republic) Santo Domingo
2026 South American Games	September 21–26, 2026	(Argentina) Santa Fe

== Qualification summary ==
A total of 13 countries qualified athletes.

Nation	Men			Women			Mixed	Total
Nation	Individual	Doubles	Team	Individual	Doubles	Team	Doubles	Athletes
Argentina	3	1	X	3	1	X	X	6
Barbados				3	1	X		3
Brazil	3	1	X	3	1	X	X	6
Canada	3	1	X	3	1	X	X	6
Chile	3	1	X					3
Colombia	4	1	X	3	1	X	X	7
Ecuador	3	1	X	3	1	X	X	6
Guatemala	3	1	X	3	1	X	X	6
Jamaica	3	1	X					3
Mexico	3	1	X	3	1	X	X	6
Paraguay				4	1	X		4
Peru	3	1	X	3	1	X	X	6
United States	3	1	X	3	1	X	X	6
Total: 13 NOCs	37	11	11	37	11	11	9	74

== Men ==
Event	Criterion	Qualified	Athletes per NOC	Total
Host nation	—N/a	Peru	3	3
2025 Junior Pan American Games	Gold medalist	Juan José Torres (COL)	1	1
2026 Pan American Squash Championships	Top 10	Argentina; Mexico; United States; Colombia; Canada; Brazil; Jamaica; Guatemala; Chile; Ecuador	3	30
North American Ranking	From a non-qualified NOC	—N/a	0	0
2026 Central American and Caribbean Games	Gold medalist (from a non-qualified NOC)	—N/a	0	0
2026 South American Games	Gold medalist (from a non-qualified NOC)	—N/a	0	0
Reallocation	2026 Pan American Championships		1	3
TOTAL				37

== Women ==
Event	Criterion	Qualified	Athletes per NOC	Total
Host nation	—N/a	Peru	3	3
2025 Junior Pan American Games	Gold medalist	Fiorella Gatti (PAR)	1	1
2026 Pan American Squash Championships	Top 10	United States; Canada; Mexico; Colombia; Barbados; Ecuador; Brazil; Argentina; Paraguay; Guatemala	3	30
North American Ranking	From a non-qualified NOC	—N/a	0	0
2026 Central American and Caribbean Games	Gold medalist (from a non-qualified NOC)	—N/a	0	0
2026 South American Games	Gold medalist (from a non-qualified NOC)	—N/a	0	0
Reallocation	2026 Pan American Championships		1	3
TOTAL				37
