= Roller sports at the 2027 Pan American Games – Qualification =

The following is the qualification system and qualified countries for the Roller sports at the 2027 Pan American Games competition which will be held in Lima, Peru.

== Qualification ==
A total of 18 athletes qualified in artistic and 48 in speed skating. The 2025 Junior Pan American Games, the Pan American Championships for each discipline held in 2026, the 2026 Central American and Caribbean Games and the 2026 South American Games were used to determine the qualifiers.

== Qualification timeline ==
| Events | Date | Venue |
|---|---|---|
| 2025 Junior Pan American Games | August 10–22, 2025 | (Paraguay) Asuncion |
| 2026 Pan American Artistic Skating Championship | June 27 – July 7, 2026 | (Argentina) Buenos Aires |
| 2026 Pan American Speed Skating Championship | July 14–19, 2026 | (Colombia) Antioquía |
| 2026 Central American and Caribbean Games | July 25–26, 2026 | (Dominican Republic) Santo Domingo |
| 2026 South American Games | September 14–16, 2026 | (Argentina) Santa Fe |

== Qualification summary ==
| NOC | Figure | | Speed | | Skateboarding | | Total |
| NOC | Men | Women | Men | Women | Men | Women | Total |
|---|---|---|---|---|---|---|---|
| Argentina | 1 | 1 | | | | | 2 |
| Brazil | 1 | 1 | | | | | 2 |
| Colombia | 1 | 2 | | | | | 3 |
| Chile | 1 | 1 | | | | | 2 |
| Ecuador | 1 | | | | | | 1 |
| El Salvador | | 1 | | | | | 1 |
| Mexico | | 1 | | | | | 1 |
| Peru | 1 | 1 | | | | | 2 |
| United States | 1 | | | | | | 1 |
| Uruguay | 1 | 1 | | | | | 2 |
| Venezuela | 1 | | | | | | 1 |
| Total: 11 NOCs | 9 | 9 | 22 | 22 | 17 | 17 | 96 |

== Figure ==
The top six nations in the 2026 Pan American Championship and the best nation in the 2026 Central American and Caribbean Games not yet qualified received spots along with hosts Peru, who were given an automatic entrant into each event. A nation could enter a maximum one skater per event. A total of 18 quotas were available (nine per gender). One extra spot per gender was granted to the winners of the 2025 Junior Pan American Games.

| Event | Qualified Men | Qualified Women |
|---|---|---|
| Host nation | Peru | Peru |
| 2025 Junior Pan American Games | Erik Leite (BRA) | Paulina Ruiz (COL) |
| 2026 Pan American Championship | Argentina; Colombia; Chile; United States; Ecuador; Uruguay | Brazil; Argentina; Chile; Uruguay; Colombia; Mexico |
| 2026 Central American and Caribbean Games | Venezuela | El Salvador |
| TOTAL | 9 | 9 |

== Speed ==
A total of 48 speed skaters will qualify. Peru as host nation received the maximum quota allocation of four (two men and two women). The remaining 40 spots were allocated using the results of the 2025 Junior Pan American Games, the 2026 Pan American Championship and the 2026 South American Games.

| Event | Skaters per NOC | Qualified Men | Qualified Women |
|---|---|---|---|
| Host nation | 2 | Peru | Peru |
| 2025 Junior Pan American Games | 1 | Santiago Vásquez (COL); Sebastián Florez (COL); Jacob Melton (USA) | Kollin Castro (COL); Yicel Giraldo (COL) |
| 2026 Pan American Championship | 2 | Chile | Chile |
| 2026 South American Games | 2 | Brazil | |
| TOTAL | | 24 | 24 |
