= Table tennis at the 2027 Pan American Games – Qualification =

The following is the qualification system and list of qualified nations for the table tennis at the 2027 Pan American Games competition.

== Qualification system ==
A total of 88 athletes will qualify to compete (44 men and 44 women). Each nation may enter a maximum of 6 athletes (three per gender). In each gender there will be a total of 12 teams qualified, with one team per event reserved for the host nation Peru. Six places will be allocated for singles events (by gender) to athletes that have obtained the best results at the qualification tournament for singles events of the Pan American Games. Athletes qualified through various qualifying events.

The top team (for men and women) at the 2026 South American Games, the top two teams (not already qualified) at the 2026 Pan American Championships, the top two teams (not already qualified) from the Caribbean, Central America, the top team from South America and the top team from North America, and the two best teams from the Special qualification event will each qualify a team. As stated earlier, Peru also qualified a team in each event. The last 6 spots will be awarded to individuals, with a maximum of two per nation.

== Qualification timeline ==
Event	Date	Venue
2025 Junior Pan American Games	August 16–22	(Paraguay) Asuncion
2026 South American Games	September 21–26	(Argentina) Santa Fe
Pan American Championships	October 18–25	(Peru) Lima
2027 North American Championship	TBD	TBD
2027 Central American and Caribbean Championship	TBD	TBD
2027 South American Championship	TBD	TBD
Special Qualification Event - Teams	TBD	TBD
Special Qualification Event - Singles

== Qualification summary ==
A total of 5 countries qualified athletes.

NOC	Men		Women		Total
NOC	Individual	Team	Individual	Team	Total
Argentina	2	X			3
Brazil	2	X			3
Chile			2	X	3
Peru	2	X	2	X	6
Puerto Rico			3	X	4
United States	1		2	X	4
Total: 6 NOCs	44	12	44	12	88

- Each country with a team enters three athletes per respective gender, but is only allowed a maximum two in the individual event.

== Men ==
Competition/Ranking	Athletes per NOC	Total	Qualified
Host Nation	3	3	Peru
2025 Junior Pan American Games	1	1	Nandan Naresh (USA)
2026 South American Games	3	3	Brazil
Pan American Championships	3	6	Argentina
North America	3	3	
Central American and Caribbean Championships	3	12	
South American Championship	3	3	
Special Qualification Event - Teams	3	6	
Special Qualification Event - Singles	1	6	
Universality	1	1	
TOTAL		44	

== Women ==
Competition/Ranking	Athletes per NOC	Total	Qualified
Host Nation	3	3	Peru
2025 Junior Pan American Games	1	1	Edmarie Leon (PUR)
2026 South American Games	3	3	Chile
Pan American Championships	3	6	United States; Puerto Rico
North America	3	3	
Central American and Caribbean Championships	3	12	
South American Championship	3	3	
Special Qualification Event - Teams	3	6	
Special Qualification Event - Singles	1	6	
Universality	1	1	
TOTAL		44	
