= Triathlon at the 2027 Pan American Games – Qualification =

The following is the qualification system for the triathlon at the 2027 Pan American Games event and qualified athletes/quotas.

== Qualification system ==
A total of 72 triathletes (36 per gender) will qualify to compete. A nation may enter a maximum of 6 triathletes (three per gender), with the exception of the winners of the 2025 Junior Pan American Games. The host nation (Peru) automatically qualified four athletes (two per gender). All other nations will qualify through various qualifying tournaments and rankings. A maximum five nations could enter the maximum of 3 triathletes per gender.

The top placed mixed relay team not yet qualified at the 2026 South American Games and 2026 Central American and Caribbean Games will each qualify two athletes per gender. The top five teams not qualified at the Pan American Mixed Relays Championship will also qualify two quotas per gender. The rest of the slots will be awarded through the ITU World Ranking as of April 15, 2027 and through wild card slots. An athlete cannot earn more than one slot for their country.

A country may enter the mixed relay competition if it has qualified at least two male and two female triathletes.

== Qualification timeline ==
Events	Date	Venue
2021 Junior Pan American Games	August 20–22	(Paraguay) Asunción
2026 Central American and Caribbean Games	August 1–3	(Dominican Republic) Santo Domingo
2026 South American Games	September 12–16	(Argentina) Santa Fe
2027 Pan American Mixed Relays Championship	April 2027	TBD
ITU World Rankings	April 15, 2027	—N/a
Wildcards	TBC	—N/a

== Qualification summary ==
NOC	Men	Women	Mixed relay	Total
Brazil	2	2	X	4
Mexico	2	2	X	4
Peru	2	2	X	4
United States	1	1		2
Total: 4 NOCs	36	36	3	72

== Qualification progress ==
Event	Quotas	Men	Women
Host nation	2	Peru; Peru	Peru; Peru
2025 Junior Pan American Games	1	Legg Braxton (USA)	Ruff Naomi (USA)
2026 Central American and Caribbean Games	2	Mexico; Mexico	Mexico; Mexico
2026 South American Games	2	Brazil; Brazil	Brazil; Brazil
2027 Pan American Mixed Relay Championships	10		
ITU World Rankings	16		
Invitational	3		
Total	72	36	36
