= Colombia at the 2027 Pan American Games =

- IOC code: COL
- NOC: Colombian Olympic Committee

in Lima, Peru 2027 – 2027
- Competitors: 89 in 11 sports
- Medals: Gold 0 Silver 0 Bronze 0 Total 0

Pan American Games appearances (overview)
- 1951; 1955; 1959; 1963; 1967; 1971; 1975; 1979; 1983; 1987; 1991; 1995; 1999; 2003; 2007; 2011; 2015; 2019; 2023; 2027

Colombia is scheduled to compete at the 2027 Pan American Games in Lima, Peru from July 23 to August 8, 2027. This will be Colombia's 20th appearance at the Pan American Games, having competed at every edition of the games since the inaugural edition in 1951.

== Competitors ==
The following is the list of number of competitors (per gender) participating at the games per sport/discipline.

Sport	Men	Women	Total
Archery	5	5	10
Bowling	0	2	2
Boxing	3	3	6
Equestrian			12
Fencing	3	6	9
Gymnastics	7	5	12
Rugby sevens	0	12	12
Sailing	2	2	4
Squash	4	3	7
Volleyball	0	12	12
Wrestling	2	1	3
Total	26	51	89

== Archery ==
Colombia qualified two recurve and two compound teams during the 2026 Pan American Archery Championships.

Men

Athlete	Event	Ranking Round		Round of 32	Round of 16	Quarterfinals	Semifinals	Final / BM	Rank
Athlete	Event	Score	Seed	Opposition Score	Opposition Score	Opposition Score	Opposition Score	Opposition Score	Rank
	Individual recurve								
	Individual compound			—N/a					
	Individual compound			—N/a					
	Team recurve			—N/a					
	Team compound			—N/a					

Women

Athlete	Event	Ranking Round		Round of 32	Round of 16	Quarterfinals	Semifinals	Final / BM	Rank
Athlete	Event	Score	Seed	Opposition Score	Opposition Score	Opposition Score	Opposition Score	Opposition Score	Rank
	Individual recurve								
	Individual compound			—N/a					
	Individual compound			—N/a					
	Team recurve			—N/a					
	Team compound			—N/a					

Mixed

Athlete	Event	Ranking Round		Round of 32	Round of 16	Quarterfinals	Semifinals	Final / BM	Rank
Athlete	Event	Score	Seed	Opposition Score	Opposition Score	Opposition Score	Opposition Score	Opposition Score	Rank
	Team recurve			—N/a					
	Team compound			—N/a					

== Bowling ==
Colombia qualified a team of two female bowlers through the 2026 South American Games.

Women

Athlete	Event	Ranking round																		Semifinal	Final	
Athlete	Event	Block 1								Block 2								Total	Rank	Opposition Result	Opposition Result	Rank
Athlete	Event	1	2	3	4	5	6	7	8	9	10	11	12	13	14	15	16	Total	Rank	Opposition Result	Opposition Result	Rank
	Singles																					
	Doubles																			—N/a		

== Boxing ==
Colombia qualified 6 boxers (three men and three women) after they reached the semifinals at the 2026 Pan American Boxing Championship.

Men

Athlete	Event	Quarterfinal	Semifinal	Final	
Athlete	Event	Opposition Result	Opposition Result	Opposition Result	Rank
	–70 kg				
	–90 kg				
	+90 kg				

Women

Athlete	Event	Quarterfinal	Semifinal	Final	
Athlete	Event	Opposition Result	Opposition Result	Opposition Result	Rank
	–60 kg				
	–70 kg				
	–75 kg				

== Equestrian ==
Colombia qualified a full team of 12 equestrians (four in Dressage, Eventing and Jumping) after reaching the podium in all disciplines at the 2026 Central American and Caribbean Games.

=== Dressage ===
Athlete	Horse	Event	Prix St. Georges		Grand Prix Special			Grand Prix Freestyle	
Athlete	Horse	Event	Score	Rank	Score	Total	Rank	Score	Rank
		Individual				—N/a			
		Team						—N/a	

=== Eventing ===
Athlete	Horse	Event	Dressage		Cross-country			Jumping			Total	
Athlete	Horse	Event	Result	Rank	Penalties	Total	Rank	Penalties	Total	Rank	Penalties	Rank
		Individual										
		Team			—N/a			—N/a			—N/a	

=== Jumping ===
Athlete	Horse	Event	Qualification											Final							
Athlete	Horse	Event	Round 1			Round 2.1			Round 2.2			Total		Round A			Round B			Total	
Athlete	Horse	Event	Faults	Result Time	Rank	Faults	Result Time	Rank	Faults	Result Time	Rank	Faults	Rank	Faults	Result Time	Rank	Faults	Result Time	Rank	Faults	Rank
		Individual																			
		Team		—N/a			—N/a			—N/a				—N/a							

== Fencing ==
Colombia qualified a team of 9 fencers (three men and six women), after three teams finished at least in the top seven at the 2026 Pan American Fencing Championships in Lima, Peru.

Men

Athlete	Event	Pool Round		Round of 16	Quarterfinals	Semifinals	Final	
Athlete	Event	Victories	Seed	Opposition Score	Opposition Score	Opposition Score	Opposition Score	Rank
	Individual épée							
	Team épée	—N/a						

Women

Athlete	Event	Pool Round		Round of 16	Quarterfinals	Semifinals	Final	
Athlete	Event	Victories	Seed	Opposition Score	Opposition Score	Opposition Score	Opposition Score	Rank
	Individual foil							
	Individual sabre							
	Team foil	—N/a						
	Team sabre	—N/a						

== Gymnastics ==
=== Artistic ===
Colombia qualified a team of seven gymnasts in artistic (five men and two women) at the 2026 Pan American Artistic Gymnastics Championships. The country also qualified one male gymnast at the 2025 Junior Pan American Games.

Men

Team & Individual Qualification

Athlete	Event	Final							
Athlete	Event	Apparatus						Total	Rank
Athlete	Event	F	PH	R	V	PB	HB	Total	Rank
Thomas Mejía	Team								
Total	Team								
Total	Team								

Qualification Legend: Q = Qualified to apparatus final

Women

Athlete	Event	Qualification				Total	Rank
Athlete	Event	V	UB	BB	F	Total	Rank
	Individual all-around						

Qualification Legend: Q = Qualified to apparatus final

=== Rhythmic ===
Colombia qualified one individual gymnast in rhythmic at the 2026 Pan American Rhythmic Gymnastics Championships.

Individual

Athlete	Event	Apparatus				Total	
Athlete	Event	Ball	Clubs	Hoop	Ribbon	Score	Rank
	All-around						

=== Trampoline ===
Colombia qualified three gymnasts in trampoline (one man and two women) at the 2026 Pan American Trampoline and Tumbling Championships.

Men

Athlete	Event	Qualification		Final	
Athlete	Event	Score	Rank	Score	Rank
	Individual				

Women

Athlete	Event	Qualification		Final	
Athlete	Event	Score	Rank	Score	Rank
	Individual				
	Synchronized				

== Rugby sevens ==
Colombia qualified a women's team (of 12 athletes) after winning the bronze medal at the 2026 Sudamérica Rugby Women's Sevens.

Summary

Team	Event	Group stage				Semifinal	Final / BM / Pl.	
Team	Event	Opposition Result	Opposition Result	Opposition Result	Rank	Opposition Result	Opposition Result	Rank
Colombia women	Women's tournament							

== Sailing ==
Colombia qualified 2 boats for a total of 4 sailors.

Athlete	Event	Opening series																		Finals				
Athlete	Event	1	2	3	4	5	6	7	8	9	10	11	12	13	14	15	16	Points	Rank	QF	SF	M / F	Points	Rank
	Men's sunfish											—N/a												
	Lightning											—N/a								—N/a				

== Squash ==
Colombia qualified a male athlete after his victory at the 2025 Junior Pan American Games. Colombia qualified a full team of six athletes (three men and three women) through the 2026 Pan American Squash Championships.

Men

Athlete	Event	Round of 32	Round of 16	Quarterfinal	Semifinal	Final / BM	
Athlete	Event	Opposition Result	Opposition Result	Opposition Result	Opposition Result	Opposition Result	Rank
Juan José Torres	Singles						
	Doubles	—N/a					
	Team	—N/a					

Women

Athlete	Event	Round of 32	Round of 16	Quarterfinal	Semifinal	Final / BM	
Athlete	Event	Opposition Result	Opposition Result	Opposition Result	Opposition Result	Opposition Result	Rank
	Singles						
	Doubles	—N/a					
	Team	—N/a					

Mixed

Athlete	Event	Round of 16	Quarterfinal	Semifinal	Final / BM	
Athlete	Event	Opposition Result	Opposition Result	Opposition Result	Opposition Result	Rank
	Doubles					

== Volleyball ==
=== Indoor ===
Colombia qualified both a women's team after finishing second in the 2026 Copa Sudamericana.

Summary

Team	Event	Group stage				Semifinal	Final / BM / Pl.	
Team	Event	Opposition Result	Opposition Result	Opposition Result	Rank	Opposition Result	Opposition Result	Rank
Colombia women	Women's tournament							

== Wrestling ==
Colombia qualified 3 wrestlers (two men and one woman) through the 2026 Pan American Wrestling Championships.

Key:

- VT – Victory by fall.
- PP – Decision by points – the loser with technical points.
- PO – Decision by points – the loser without technical points.
- SP – Technical superiority – the loser with technical points and a margin of victory of at least 9 (Greco-Roman) or 10 (freestyle) points.
- ST – Great superiority – the loser without technical points and a margin of victory of at least 8 (Greco-Roman) or 10 (freestyle) points.
- VA – Decision by withdrawal

Athlete	Event	Round of 16	Quarterfinal	Semifinal	Repechage	Final / BM	
Athlete	Event	Opposition Result	Opposition Result	Opposition Result	Opposition Result	Opposition Result	Rank
	Men's Freestyle 86 kg						
	Men's Greco-Roman 67 kg						
	Women's Freestyle 68 kg						
