= Brazil at the 2027 Pan American Games =

- IOC code: BRA
- NOC: Brazilian Olympic Committee

in Lima, Peru 2027 – 2027
- Competitors: 259 in 25 sports
- Medals: Gold 0 Silver 0 Bronze 0 Total 0

Pan American Games appearances (overview)
- 1951; 1955; 1959; 1963; 1967; 1971; 1975; 1979; 1983; 1987; 1991; 1995; 1999; 2003; 2007; 2011; 2015; 2019; 2023; 2027

Brazil will compete at the 2027 Pan American Games in Lima, Peru. This will be Brazil's 20th appearance at the Pan American Games, having competed at every edition of the games since the inaugural edition in 1951.

Brazilian athletes will have two possible major paths to qualify for the games: the 2025 Junior Pan American Games and the 2026 South American Games; many other qualifying tournaments will be held.

== Competitors ==
The following is the list of number of competitors (per gender) participating at the games per sport/discipline.

Sport	Men	Women	Total
Archery	5	4	9
Athletics	11	6	17
Bowling	2	0	2
Boxing	5	7	12
Cycling	0	1	1
Equestrian			12
Fencing	9	9	18
Gymnastics	7	14	21
Handball	14	14	28
Judo	6	5	11
Karate	1	0	1
Roller sports	2	1	3
Rugby sevens	0	12	12
Sailing	5	4	9
Shooting	1	0	1
Softball	0	16	16
Squash	3	3	6
Swimming	5	6	11
Table tennis	3	0	3
Taekwondo	1	0	1
Tennis	1	0	1
Triathlon	2	2	14
Volleyball	14	12	26
Water polo	13	13	26
Wrestling	4	4	8
Total	114	133	259

== Archery ==
Brazil qualified two archers after winning their categories at the 2025 Junior Pan American Games. Brazil also qualified two recurve teams during the 2026 Pan American Archery Championships and one compound archer during the 2026 South American Games.

Men

Athlete	Event	Ranking Round		Round of 32	Round of 16	Quarterfinals	Semifinals	Final / BM	Rank
Athlete	Event	Score	Seed	Opposition Score	Opposition Score	Opposition Score	Opposition Score	Opposition Score	Rank
	Individual recurve								
Rafael Magalhães	Individual compound			—N/a					
	Individual compound			—N/a					
	Team recurve			—N/a					

Women

Athlete	Event	Ranking Round		Round of 32	Round of 16	Quarterfinals	Semifinals	Final / BM	Rank
Athlete	Event	Score	Seed	Opposition Score	Opposition Score	Opposition Score	Opposition Score	Opposition Score	Rank
	Individual recurve								
	Team recurve			—N/a					

Mixed

Athlete	Event	Ranking Round		Round of 32	Round of 16	Quarterfinals	Semifinals	Final / BM	Rank
Athlete	Event	Score	Seed	Opposition Score	Opposition Score	Opposition Score	Opposition Score	Opposition Score	Rank
	Team recurve			—N/a					

== Athletics ==
Brazil qualified 17 athletes (11 men and 6 women) after winning their events at the 2025 Junior Pan American Games, 2026 Pan American Athletics Championships or South American Games.

Key

- Note–Ranks given for track events are within the athlete's heat only
- Q = Qualified for the next round
- q = Qualified for the next round as a fastest loser
- Bye = Athlete not required to compete in round

Men

Track & road events

Athlete	Event	Semifinal		Final	
Athlete	Event	Result	Rank	Result	Rank
Alison dos Santos	400 m				
Eduardo Moreira	800 m				
Rafael Pereira	110 m hurdles				
Matheus Lima	400 m hurdles				
Caio Bonfim	Half marathon walk	—N/a			

Field events

Athlete	Event	Final	
Athlete	Event	Distance	Position
Fernando Ferreira	High jump		
Augusto Dutra	Pole vault		
Almir dos Santos	Triple jump		
Elton Petronilho	Triple jump		
Willian Dourado	Shot put		

Combined events – Decathlon

Athlete	Event	100 m	LJ	SP	HJ	400 m	110H	DT	PV	JT	1500 m	Final	Rank
José Fernando Ferreira	Result												
Points													

Women

Track & road events

Athlete	Event	Semifinal		Final	
Athlete	Event	Result	Rank	Result	Rank
Sabrina Pena	800 m				
Vitória Sena	100 m hurdles				

Field events

Athlete	Event	Final	
Athlete	Event	Distance	Position
Juliana Campos	Pole vault		
Gabriele Sousa dos Santos	Triple jump		
Andressa Morais	Discus throw		

Combined events – Heptathlon

Athlete	Event	100H	HJ	SP	200 m	LJ	JT	800 m	Final	Rank
Paloma Cardoso	Result									
Points										

== Bowling ==
Brazil qualified a team of two male bowlers through the 2026 South American Games.

Men

Athlete	Event	Ranking round																		Semifinal	Final	
Athlete	Event	Block 1								Block 2								Total	Rank	Opposition Result	Opposition Result	Rank
Athlete	Event	1	2	3	4	5	6	7	8	9	10	11	12	13	14	15	16	Total	Rank	Opposition Result	Opposition Result	Rank
	Singles																					
	Doubles																			—N/a		

== Boxing ==
Brazil qualified 12 boxers (five men and seven women) after they reached the semifinals at the 2026 Pan American Boxing Championship.

Men

Athlete	Event	Quarterfinal	Semifinal	Final	
Athlete	Event	Opposition Result	Opposition Result	Opposition Result	Rank
	–55 kg				
	–65 kg				
	–80 kg				
	–90 kg				
	+90 kg				

Women

Athlete	Event	Quarterfinal	Semifinal	Final	
Athlete	Event	Opposition Result	Opposition Result	Opposition Result	Rank
	–51 kg				
	–54 kg				
	–57 kg				
	–60 kg				
	–65 kg				
	–70 kg				
	–75 kg				

== Cycling ==
=== Mountain biking ===
Brazil qualified a female mountain biker after winning the competition at the 2025 Junior Pan American Games.

Athlete	Event	Time	Rank
Luiza Cocuzzi	Women's cross-country		

== Equestrian ==
Brazil qualified a full team of 12 equestrians (four in Dressage, Eventing and Jumping).

=== Dressage ===
Athlete	Horse	Event	Prix St. Georges		Grand Prix Special			Grand Prix Freestyle	
Athlete	Horse	Event	Score	Rank	Score	Total	Rank	Score	Rank
		Individual				—N/a			
		Team						—N/a	

=== Eventing ===
Athlete	Horse	Event	Dressage		Cross-country			Jumping			Total	
Athlete	Horse	Event	Result	Rank	Penalties	Total	Rank	Penalties	Total	Rank	Penalties	Rank
		Individual										
		Team			—N/a			—N/a			—N/a	

=== Jumping ===
Athlete	Horse	Event	Qualification											Final							
Athlete	Horse	Event	Round 1			Round 2.1			Round 2.2			Total		Round A			Round B			Total	
Athlete	Horse	Event	Faults	Result Time	Rank	Faults	Result Time	Rank	Faults	Result Time	Rank	Faults	Rank	Faults	Result Time	Rank	Faults	Result Time	Rank	Faults	Rank
		Individual																			
		Team		—N/a			—N/a			—N/a				—N/a							

== Fencing ==
Brazil qualified a full team of 18 fencers (nine men and nine women), after all six teams finished at least in the top seven at the 2026 Pan American Fencing Championships in Lima, Peru.

Men

Athlete	Event	Pool Round		Round of 16	Quarterfinals	Semifinals	Final	
Athlete	Event	Victories	Seed	Opposition Score	Opposition Score	Opposition Score	Opposition Score	Rank
	Individual épée							
	Individual foil							
	Individual sabre							
	Team épée	—N/a						
	Team foil	—N/a						
	Team sabre	—N/a						

Women

Athlete	Event	Pool Round		Round of 16	Quarterfinals	Semifinals	Final	
Athlete	Event	Victories	Seed	Opposition Score	Opposition Score	Opposition Score	Opposition Score	Rank
	Individual épée							
	Individual foil							
	Individual sabre							
	Team épée	—N/a						
	Team foil	—N/a						
	Team sabre	—N/a						

== Gymnastics ==
=== Artistic ===
Brazil qualified a team of ten gymnasts in artistic (five men and five women) at the 2026 Pan American Artistic Gymnastics Championships.

Men

Team & Individual Qualification

Athlete	Event	Final							
Athlete	Event	Apparatus						Total	Rank
Athlete	Event	F	PH	R	V	PB	HB	Total	Rank
	Team								
Total	Team								

Qualification Legend: Q = Qualified to apparatus final

Women

Team & Individual Qualification

Athlete	Event	Final					
Athlete	Event	Apparatus				Total	Rank
Athlete	Event	V	UB	BB	F	Total	Rank
	Team						
Total	Team						

Qualification Legend: Q = Qualified to apparatus final

=== Rhythmic ===
Brazil qualified two individual gymnasts and five gymnasts for the group event in rhythmic at the 2026 Pan American Rhythmic Gymnastics Championships.

Individual

Athlete	Event	Apparatus				Total	
Athlete	Event	Ball	Clubs	Hoop	Ribbon	Score	Rank
	All-around						

Group

Athlete	Event	Apparatus		Total	
Athlete	Event	5 balls	3 hoops + 2 clubs	Score	Rank
	All-around				

=== Trampoline ===
Brazil qualified four gymnasts in trampoline (two men and two women) at the 2026 Pan American Trampoline and Tumbling Championships.

Men

Athlete	Event	Qualification		Final	
Athlete	Event	Score	Rank	Score	Rank
	Individual				
	Synchronized				

Women

Athlete	Event	Qualification		Final	
Athlete	Event	Score	Rank	Score	Rank
	Individual				
	Synchronized				

== Handball ==
Brazil qualified both men's and women's teams as their junior team claimed gold medal at the 2025 Junior Pan American Games.

Summary

Team	Event	Group stage				Semifinal	Final / BM / Pl.	
Team	Event	Opposition Result	Opposition Result	Opposition Result	Rank	Opposition Result	Opposition Result	Rank
Brazil men	Men's tournament							
Brazil women	Women's tournament							

== Judo ==
Brazil qualified 11 judoka (six men and five women) after winning their respective categories at the 2025 Junior Pan American Games.

Men

Athlete	Event	Round of 16	Quarterfinals	Semifinals	Repechage	Final / BM	
Athlete	Event	Opposition Result	Opposition Result	Opposition Result	Opposition Result	Opposition Result	Rank
Bruno Nóbrega	-66 kg						
Matheus Nolasco	-73 kg						
Luan Almeida	-81 kg						
Jesse Barbosa	-90 kg						
Gustavo Milano	-100 kg						
Andrey Coelho	+100 kg						

Women

Athlete	Event	Round of 16	Quarterfinals	Semifinals	Repechage	Final / BM	
Athlete	Event	Opposition Result	Opposition Result	Opposition Result	Opposition Result	Opposition Result	Rank
Clarice Ribeiro	−48 kg						
Rafaela Cavalcanti	−52 kg						
Bianca Reis	−57 kg						
Eduarda Bastos	−63 kg						
Dandara Camilo	−78 kg						

== Karate ==
Brazil qualified a male karateka after winning his category at the 2025 Junior Pan American Games.

Kumite

Men

Athlete	Event	Round robin					Semifinal	Final	
Athlete	Event	Opposition Result	Opposition Result	Opposition Result	Opposition Result	Rank	Opposition Result	Opposition Result	Rank
Andrey Nazário	−84 kg								

== Roller sports ==
=== Artistic ===
Brazil qualified an artistic skater after winning his competition at the 2025 Junior Pan American Games.

Athlete	Event	Short program		Long program		Total	
Athlete	Event	Score	Rank	Score	Rank	Score	Rank
Erik Medziukevicius	Men's						

=== Skateboarding ===
Brazil qualified two skateboarders after winning their competitions at the 2025 Junior Pan American Games.

Men

Athlete	Event	Final	
Athlete	Event	Score	Rank
Filipe Mota	Street		

Women

Athlete	Event	Final	
Athlete	Event	Score	Rank
Maria Lúcia Campos	Street		

== Rugby sevens ==
=== Women's tournament ===
Brazil qualified a women's team (of 12 athletes) after winning the gold medal at the 2025 Junior Pan American Games.

Summary

Team	Event	Group stage				Semifinal	Final / BM / Pl.	
Team	Event	Opposition Result	Opposition Result	Opposition Result	Rank	Opposition Result	Opposition Result	Rank
Brazil women	Women's tournament							

== Sailing ==
Brazil qualified 6 boats for a total of 9 sailors.

Men

Athlete	Event	Opening series																		Finals				
Athlete	Event	1	2	3	4	5	6	7	8	9	10	11	12	13	14	15	16	Points	Rank	QF	SF	M / F	Points	Rank
	IQFoil																							
	ILCA 7											—N/a								—N/a				
Lucas Pes Fonseca	Kite																			—N/a			—N/a	

Women

Athlete	Event	Opening series																		Finals				
Athlete	Event	1	2	3	4	5	6	7	8	9	10	11	12	13	14	15	16	Points	Rank	QF	SF	M / F	Points	Rank
	ILCA 6											—N/a								—N/a				

Mixed

Athlete	Event	Race													Total	
Athlete	Event	1	2	3	4	5	6	7	8	9	10	11	12	M	Points	Rank
	Lightning											—N/a				
	Snipe															

== Shooting ==
Brazil qualified a male sport shooter after winning the competition at the 2025 Junior Pan American Games.

Men

Shotgun

Athlete	Event	Qualification		Final	
Athlete	Event	Points	Rank	Points	Rank
Hussein Daruich	Trap				

== Softball ==
Brazil qualified a women's team (of 16 athletes) by virtue of its campaign in the 2025 Pan American Championship.

Summary

Team	Event	Preliminary round				Super Round			Final / BM / Pl.	
Team	Event	Opposition Result	Opposition Result	Opposition Result	Rank	Opposition Result	Opposition Result	Rank	Opposition Result	Rank
Brazil women	Women's tournament									

== Squash ==
Brazil qualified a full team of six athletes (three men and three women) through the 2026 Pan American Squash Championships.

Men

Athlete	Event	Round of 32	Round of 16	Quarterfinal	Semifinal	Final / BM	
Athlete	Event	Opposition Result	Opposition Result	Opposition Result	Opposition Result	Opposition Result	Rank
	Singles						
	Doubles	—N/a					
	Team	—N/a					

Women

Athlete	Event	Round of 32	Round of 16	Quarterfinal	Semifinal	Final / BM	
Athlete	Event	Opposition Result	Opposition Result	Opposition Result	Opposition Result	Opposition Result	Rank
	Singles						
	Doubles	—N/a					
	Team	—N/a					

Mixed

Athlete	Event	Round of 16	Quarterfinal	Semifinal	Final / BM	
Athlete	Event	Opposition Result	Opposition Result	Opposition Result	Opposition Result	Rank
	Doubles					

== Swimming ==
Brazil qualified 11 swimmers (five men and six women) by winning events at the 2025 Junior Pan American Games.

Men

Athlete	Event	Heat		Final	
Athlete	Event	Time	Rank	Time	Rank
Guilherme Caribé	50 m freestyle				
Guilherme Caribé	100 m freestyle				
Stephan Steverink	200 m freestyle				
Stephan Steverink	400 m freestyle				
Stephan Steverink	800 m freestyle	—N/a			
Stephan Steverink	400 m individual medley				
João Pierre Campos	1500 m freestyle	—N/a			
Lúcio Flávio Filho	100 m butterfly				
Gustavo Saldo	200 m butterfly				

Women

Athlete	Event	Heat		Final	
Athlete	Event	Time	Rank	Time	Rank
Stephanie Balduccini	50 m freestyle				
Stephanie Balduccini	100 m freestyle				
Stephanie Balduccini	200 m freestyle				
Letícia Romão	800 m freestyle	—N/a			
Letícia Romão	1500 m freestyle	—N/a			
Agatha Amaral	200 m breaststroke				
Joice Rocha	100 m butterfly				
Ana Júlia Amaral	200 m butterfly				
Cibelle Jungblut	10 km open water	—N/a			

== Table tennis ==
Brazil qualified a team of three male athletes through the 2026 South American Games.

Men

Athlete	Event	Group stage			Round of 32	Round of 16	Quarterfinal	Semifinal	Final / BM	
Athlete	Event	Opposition Result	Opposition Result	Rank	Opposition Result	Opposition Result	Opposition Result	Opposition Result	Opposition Result	Rank
	Singles	—N/a								
	Singles	—N/a								
	Doubles	—N/a								
	Team				—N/a					

== Taekwondo ==
Brazil qualified a male athlete after winning the category at the 2025 Junior Pan American Games.

Kyorugi

Men

Athlete	Event	Round of 16	Quarterfinals	Semifinals	Repechage	Final / BM	
Athlete	Event	Opposition Result	Opposition Result	Opposition Result	Opposition Result	Opposition Result	Rank
Henrique Marques	–80 kg				Bye		

== Tennis ==
Brazil qualified a male tennis player after winning the singles tournament at the 2025 Junior Pan American Games.

Men

Athlete	Event	Round of 64	Round of 32	Round of 16	Quarterfinal	Semifinal	Final / BM	
Athlete	Event	Opposition Result	Opposition Result	Opposition Result	Opposition Result	Opposition Result	Opposition Result	Rank
João Pedro Bonini	Singles	Bye						

== Triathlon ==
Brazil qualified a team of four triathletes (two men and two women) after winning the mixed relay competition in the 2026 South American Games.

Individual

Athlete	Event	Swim (1.5 km)	Trans 1	Bike (40 km)	Trans 2	Run (10 km)	Total	Rank
	Men's							
	Women's							

Relay

Athlete	Event	Swimming (300 m)	Transition 1	Biking (6.6 km)	Transition 2	Running (1.5 km)	Total	Rank
	Mixed							—N/a
Total	Mixed	—N/a						

== Volleyball ==
=== Beach ===
Brazil qualified a men's pair after being the best team from CSV at the 2025 Junior Pan American Games.

Athlete	Event	Group stage				Round of 16	Quarterfinal	Semifinal	Final / BM	
Athlete	Event	Opposition Result	Opposition Result	Opposition Result	Rank	Opposition Result	Opposition Result	Opposition Result	Opposition Result	Rank
	Men's tournament									

=== Indoor ===
Brazil qualified both men's and women's teams as their junior team claimed gold medal at the 2025 Junior Pan American Games.

Summary

Team	Event	Group stage				Semifinal	Final / BM / Pl.	
Team	Event	Opposition Result	Opposition Result	Opposition Result	Rank	Opposition Result	Opposition Result	Rank
Brazil men	Men's tournament							
Brazil women	Women's tournament							

== Water polo ==
Summary

Team	Event	Group stage				Quarterfinal	Semifinal	Final / BM / Pl.	
Team	Event	Opposition Result	Opposition Result	Opposition Result	Rank	Opposition Result	Opposition Result	Opposition Result	Rank
Brazil men's	Men's tournament								
Brazil women's	Women's tournament								

=== Men's tournament ===
Brazil qualified a men's team (of 13 athletes) by winning the 2026 South American Games.

=== Women's tournament ===
Brazil qualified a women's team (of 13 athletes) by winning the 2026 South American Games.

== Wrestling ==
Brazil qualified 8 wrestlers (four men and four women) through the 2026 Pan American Wrestling Championships.

Key:

- VT – Victory by fall.
- PP – Decision by points – the loser with technical points.
- PO – Decision by points – the loser without technical points.
- SP – Technical superiority – the loser with technical points and a margin of victory of at least 9 (Greco-Roman) or 10 (freestyle) points.
- ST – Great superiority – the loser without technical points and a margin of victory of at least 8 (Greco-Roman) or 10 (freestyle) points.
- VA – Decision by withdrawal

Men

Athlete	Event	Round of 16	Quarterfinal	Semifinal	Repechage	Final / BM	
Athlete	Event	Opposition Result	Opposition Result	Opposition Result	Opposition Result	Opposition Result	Rank
	Freestyle 125 kg						
	Greco-Roman 60 kg						
	Greco-Roman 77 kg						
	Greco-Roman 130 kg						

Women

Athlete	Event	Round of 16	Quarterfinal	Semifinal	Repechage	Final / BM	
Athlete	Event	Opposition Result	Opposition Result	Opposition Result	Opposition Result	Opposition Result	Rank
	Freestyle 50 kg						
	Freestyle 53 kg						
	Freestyle 57 kg						
	Freestyle 62 kg						
