= United States at the 2027 Pan American Games =

- IOC code: USA
- NOC: United States Olympic & Paralympic Committee

in Lima, Peru 2027 – 2027
- Competitors: 259 in 14 sports
- Medals: Gold 0 Silver 0 Bronze 0 Total 0

Pan American Games appearances (overview)
- 1951; 1955; 1959; 1963; 1967; 1971; 1975; 1979; 1983; 1987; 1991; 1995; 1999; 2003; 2007; 2011; 2015; 2019; 2023; 2027

The United States are scheduled to compete at the 2027 Pan American Games in Lima, Peru from July 23 to August 8, 2027. This will be United States's 20th appearance at the Pan American Games, having competed at every edition of the games since the inaugural edition in 1951.

== Competitors ==
The following is the list of number of competitors (per gender) participating at the games per sport/discipline.

Sport	Men	Women	Total
Archery	5	5	10
Boxing	3	5	8
Fencing	9	9	18
Field hockey	16	16	32
Football	18	0	18
Gymnastics	8	17	25
Handball	14	14	28
Rugby sevens	12	12	24
Sailing	10	9	19
Softball	0	16	16
Squash	3	3	6
Table tennis	1	3	4
Volleyball	12	12	24
Wrestling	20	7	27
Total	131	128	259

== Archery ==
The United States qualified two recurve and two compound teams during the 2026 Pan American Archery Championships.

Men

Athlete	Event	Ranking Round		Round of 32	Round of 16	Quarterfinals	Semifinals	Final / BM	Rank
Athlete	Event	Score	Seed	Opposition Score	Opposition Score	Opposition Score	Opposition Score	Opposition Score	Rank
	Individual recurve								
	Individual compound			—N/a					
	Individual compound			—N/a					
	Team recurve			—N/a					
	Team compound			—N/a					

Women

Athlete	Event	Ranking Round		Round of 32	Round of 16	Quarterfinals	Semifinals	Final / BM	Rank
Athlete	Event	Score	Seed	Opposition Score	Opposition Score	Opposition Score	Opposition Score	Opposition Score	Rank
	Individual recurve								
	Individual compound			—N/a					
	Individual compound			—N/a					
	Team recurve			—N/a					
	Team compound			—N/a					

Mixed

Athlete	Event	Ranking Round		Round of 32	Round of 16	Quarterfinals	Semifinals	Final / BM	Rank
Athlete	Event	Score	Seed	Opposition Score	Opposition Score	Opposition Score	Opposition Score	Opposition Score	Rank
	Team recurve			—N/a					
	Team compound			—N/a					

== Boxing ==
The United States qualified 8 boxers (three men and five women) after they reached the semifinals at the 2026 Pan American Boxing Championship.

Men

Athlete	Event	Quarterfinal	Semifinal	Final	
Athlete	Event	Opposition Result	Opposition Result	Opposition Result	Rank
	–55 kg				
	–60 kg				
	+90 kg				

Women

Athlete	Event	Quarterfinal	Semifinal	Final	
Athlete	Event	Opposition Result	Opposition Result	Opposition Result	Rank
	–51 kg				
	–54 kg				
	–57 kg				
	–60 kg				
	–70 kg				

== Fencing ==
The United States qualified a full team of 18 fencers (nine men and nine women), after all six teams finished at least in the top seven at the 2026 Pan American Fencing Championships in Lima, Peru.

Men

Athlete	Event	Pool Round		Round of 16	Quarterfinals	Semifinals	Final	
Athlete	Event	Victories	Seed	Opposition Score	Opposition Score	Opposition Score	Opposition Score	Rank
	Individual épée							
	Individual foil							
	Individual sabre							
	Team épée	—N/a						
	Team foil	—N/a						
	Team sabre	—N/a						

Women

Athlete	Event	Pool Round		Round of 16	Quarterfinals	Semifinals	Final	
Athlete	Event	Victories	Seed	Opposition Score	Opposition Score	Opposition Score	Opposition Score	Rank
	Individual épée							
	Individual foil							
	Individual sabre							
	Team épée	—N/a						
	Team foil	—N/a						
	Team sabre	—N/a						

== Field hockey ==
The United States qualified both men's and women's teams as finalists and best North American team at the 2025 Men's Pan American Cup and 2025 Women's Pan American Cup.

Summary

Team	Event	Group stage				Semifinal	Final / BM / Pl.	
Team	Event	Opposition Result	Opposition Result	Opposition Result	Rank	Opposition Result	Opposition Result	Rank
United States men	Men's tournament							
United States women	Women's tournament							

== Football ==
The United States qualified a men's team as finalists and best North American team at the 2026 CONCACAF U-20 Championship.

Summary

Key:

- A.E.T – After extra time.
- P – Match decided by penalty-shootout.

Team	Event	Group Stage				Semifinal	Final / BM	
Team	Event	Opposition Score	Opposition Score	Opposition Score	Rank	Opposition Score	Opposition Score	Rank
United States men's	Men's tournament							

== Gymnastics ==
=== Artistic ===
The United States qualified a team of eleven gymnasts in artistic (five men and six women) at the 2025 Junior Pan American Games and the 2026 Pan American Artistic Gymnastics Championships.

Men

Team & Individual Qualification

Athlete	Event	Final							
Athlete	Event	Apparatus						Total	Rank
Athlete	Event	F	PH	R	V	PB	HB	Total	Rank
	Team								
Total	Team								

Qualification Legend: Q = Qualified to apparatus final

Women

Team & Individual Qualification

Athlete	Event	Final					
Athlete	Event	Apparatus				Total	Rank
Athlete	Event	V	UB	BB	F	Total	Rank
Bernice Charleigh	Team						
Total	Team						

Qualification Legend: Q = Qualified to apparatus final

=== Rhythmic ===
The United States qualified three individual gymnasts and five gymnasts for the group event in rhythmic at the 2025 Junior Pan American Games and the 2026 Pan American Rhythmic Gymnastics Championships.

Individual

Athlete	Event	Apparatus				Total	
Athlete	Event	Ball	Clubs	Hoop	Ribbon	Score	Rank
Natalie de la Rosa	All-around						

Group

Athlete	Event	Apparatus		Total	
Athlete	Event	5 balls	3 hoops + 2 clubs	Score	Rank
	All-around				

=== Trampoline ===
The United States qualified six gymnasts in trampoline (three men and three women) at the 2025 Junior Pan American Games and the 2026 Pan American Trampoline and Tumbling Championships.

Men

Athlete	Event	Qualification		Final	
Athlete	Event	Score	Rank	Score	Rank
Ryan Maccagnan	Individual				
	Synchronized				

Women

Athlete	Event	Qualification		Final	
Athlete	Event	Score	Rank	Score	Rank
Kennedi Roberts	Individual				
	Synchronized				

== Handball ==
The United States qualified both men's and women's teams as they won the USA–CAN Qualifying Round.

Summary

Team	Event	Group stage				Semifinal	Final / BM / Pl.	
Team	Event	Opposition Result	Opposition Result	Opposition Result	Rank	Opposition Result	Opposition Result	Rank
United States men	Men's tournament							
United States women	Women's tournament							

== Rugby sevens ==
The United States qualified a men's and a women's team (of 12 athletes each) via status in the Rugby Sevens World Series.

Summary

Team	Event	Group stage				Semifinal	Final / BM / Pl.	
Team	Event	Opposition Result	Opposition Result	Opposition Result	Rank	Opposition Result	Opposition Result	Rank
United States men	Men's tournament							
United States women	Women's tournament							

== Sailing ==
The United States qualified 13 boats for a total of 19 sailors as host nation.

Men

Athlete	Event	Opening series																		Finals				
Athlete	Event	1	2	3	4	5	6	7	8	9	10	11	12	13	14	15	16	Points	Rank	QF	SF	M / F	Points	Rank
Makani Andrews	IQFoil																							
Charles Barclay	ILCA 7											—N/a								—N/a				
	ILCA 7											—N/a								—N/a				
	49er													—N/a						—N/a				
	Kite																			—N/a			—N/a	

Women

Athlete	Event	Opening series																		Finals				
Athlete	Event	1	2	3	4	5	6	7	8	9	10	11	12	13	14	15	16	Points	Rank	QF	SF	M / F	Points	Rank
	IQFoil																							
	ILCA 6											—N/a								—N/a				
	49erFX													—N/a						—N/a				
	Kite																			—N/a			—N/a	

Mixed

Athlete	Event	Race													Total	
Athlete	Event	1	2	3	4	5	6	7	8	9	10	11	12	M	Points	Rank
	Mixed 470															
	Lightning											—N/a				
	Nacra 17															

== Softball ==
The United States qualified a women's team (of 16 athletes) by virtue of being the best nation in the Americas WSBC Ranking.

Summary

Team	Event	Preliminary round				Super Round			Final / BM / Pl.	
Team	Event	Opposition Result	Opposition Result	Opposition Result	Rank	Opposition Result	Opposition Result	Rank	Opposition Result	Rank
United States women	Women's tournament									

== Squash ==
The United States qualified a full team of six athletes (three men and three women) through the 2026 Pan American Squash Championships.

Men

Athlete	Event	Round of 32	Round of 16	Quarterfinal	Semifinal	Final / BM	
Athlete	Event	Opposition Result	Opposition Result	Opposition Result	Opposition Result	Opposition Result	Rank
	Singles						
	Doubles	—N/a					
	Team	—N/a					

Women

Athlete	Event	Round of 32	Round of 16	Quarterfinal	Semifinal	Final / BM	
Athlete	Event	Opposition Result	Opposition Result	Opposition Result	Opposition Result	Opposition Result	Rank
	Singles						
	Doubles	—N/a					
	Team	—N/a					

Mixed

Athlete	Event	Round of 16	Quarterfinal	Semifinal	Final / BM	
Athlete	Event	Opposition Result	Opposition Result	Opposition Result	Opposition Result	Rank
	Doubles					

== Table tennis ==
The United States qualified a male player through the 2025 Junior Pan American Games and a team of three female athletes through the 2026 Pan American Championships.

Men

Athlete	Event	Group stage			Round of 32	Round of 16	Quarterfinal	Semifinal	Final / BM	
Athlete	Event	Opposition Result	Opposition Result	Rank	Opposition Result	Opposition Result	Opposition Result	Opposition Result	Opposition Result	Rank
Nandan Naresh	Singles	—N/a								

Women

Athlete	Event	Group stage			Round of 32	Round of 16	Quarterfinal	Semifinal	Final / BM	
Athlete	Event	Opposition Result	Opposition Result	Rank	Opposition Result	Opposition Result	Opposition Result	Opposition Result	Opposition Result	Rank
	Singles	—N/a								
	Singles	—N/a								
	Doubles	—N/a								
	Team				—N/a					

== Volleyball ==
=== Indoor ===
The United States qualified both men's and women's teams after winning the 2026 Men's Pan-American Volleyball Cup and the 2026 Women's Pan-American Volleyball Cup.

Summary

Team	Event	Group stage				Semifinal	Final / BM / Pl.	
Team	Event	Opposition Result	Opposition Result	Opposition Result	Rank	Opposition Result	Opposition Result	Rank
United States men	Men's tournament							
United States women	Women's tournament							

== Wrestling ==
The United States qualified 27 wrestlers (twenty men and six women) through the 2025 Junior Pan American Games and the 2026 Pan American Wrestling Championships.

Key:

- VT – Victory by fall.
- PP – Decision by points – the loser with technical points.
- PO – Decision by points – the loser without technical points.
- SP – Technical superiority – the loser with technical points and a margin of victory of at least 9 (Greco-Roman) or 10 (freestyle) points.
- ST – Great superiority – the loser without technical points and a margin of victory of at least 8 (Greco-Roman) or 10 (freestyle) points.
- VA – Decision by withdrawal

Men

Athlete	Event	Round of 16	Quarterfinal	Semifinal	Repechage	Final / BM	
Athlete	Event	Opposition Result	Opposition Result	Opposition Result	Opposition Result	Opposition Result	Rank
	Freestyle 57 kg						
	Freestyle 65 kg						
	Freestyle 74 kg						
	Freestyle 86 kg						
	Freestyle 97 kg						
	Freestyle 125 kg						
	Greco-Roman 60 kg						
	Greco-Roman 67 kg						
	Greco-Roman 77 kg						
	Greco-Roman 87 kg						
	Greco-Roman 97 kg						
	Greco-Roman 130 kg						

Women

Athlete	Event	Round of 16	Quarterfinal	Semifinal	Repechage	Final / BM	
Athlete	Event	Opposition Result	Opposition Result	Opposition Result	Opposition Result	Opposition Result	Rank
	Freestyle 50 kg						
	Freestyle 53 kg						
	Freestyle 57 kg						
	Freestyle 62 kg						
	Freestyle 68 kg						
	Freestyle 76 kg						
