= Squash at the 2028 Summer Olympics – Qualification =

32 quota spots available for squash at the 2028 Summer Olympics, with each gender-specific event offering 16 quota places. Each National Olympic Committee (NOC) could obtain a maximum of 2 spots in each event, if their second athletes are the two highest-ranked athletes from two different NOCs.

== Timeline ==
Event	Date	Venue
2026 Asian Games	23 September – 2 October, 2026	(Japan) Nagoya
African Continental Qualifying Tournament	17–21 August 2027	TBD
2027 European Games	16–27 June, 2027	(Turkey) Istanbul
2027 Pan American Games	25 July – 1 August, 2027	(Peru) Lima
2027 Pacific Games	24 July – 8 August, 2027	(French Polynesia) Pirae
PSA World Rankings	22 May 2028	—
Final World Qualifying Tournament	6–10 June 2028	(United States) Seattle

== Qualification ==
The qualification system for LA 2028 provides 32 quota places across the men's and women's singles events, with 16 places allocated to each gender. An NOC may qualify two athletes in the same gender through the PSA World Rankings pathway if its second-ranked eligible athlete is among the two highest-ranked eligible second athletes from different NOCs at the qualification cut-off date of 22 May 2028, taking into account athletes already allocated quota places through the Continental Games or host-country quota. If the eight ranking quota places cannot be allocated under this provision, a third NOC may obtain a second quota place through its next-highest-ranked eligible second athlete, provided that athlete is ranked within the top 50 of the PSA World Rankings.

Athletes must comply with the Olympic Charter, World Anti-Doping Code, Olympic Movement Code on the Prevention of Manipulation of Competitions, and applicable World Squash regulations. In principle, athletes must be ranked within the top 50 of the PSA World Rankings at the qualification cut-off date of 22 May 2028. Exceptions apply to athletes qualifying through the world-ranking provisions, universality places, or the Final World Qualifying Tournament. Qualification is conducted through five pathways. Five quota places per gender are awarded to the winners of designated continental qualification tournaments, followed by one host-country place per gender. Eight additional places per gender are allocated through the PSA World Rankings, with provisions limiting the number of athletes from the same NOC. One universality place is available per gender, subject to eligibility and a top-75 PSA ranking requirement, while the final place per gender is awarded through a designated Final World Qualifying Tournament involving athletes from nations that have not previously obtained one of the quota places.

The allocation and confirmation process takes place primarily in May and June 2028. World Squash will determine the qualified athletes using the PSA World Rankings on 22 May 2028, while NOCs must confirm their allocated places by the specified deadlines. Unused places from continental tournaments, the host country, or universality allocations are reallocated according to the procedures established in the qualification system, generally reverting to the world-ranking pathway. Specific provisions also govern reallocations following athlete withdrawals after quota confirmation.

The qualification period includes continental events such as the 2026 Asian Games, the 2027 African Continental Qualifying Tournament, European Games, Pan American Games, and Pacific Games. The PSA World Rankings used for qualification are published on 22 May 2028, followed by the Final World Qualifying Tournament from 6–10 June. Final quota confirmation occurs on 12 June, the sport entries deadline is 26 June, and the LA28 Olympic Games are scheduled for 14–30 July 2028.

== Qualification summary ==
=== Qualified NOCs ===
NOC	Men's singles	Women's singles	Total
Malaysia	1	1	2
United States	1	1	2
Total: 2 NOCs	2	2	4

=== Qualified athletes ===
Qualification	Men's singles	Women's singles
Host place	TBD (USA)	TBD (USA)
2026 Asian Games	Ng Eain Yow (MAS)	Sivasangari Subramaniam (MAS)
African Continental Qualifying Tournament		
2027 European Games		
2027 Pan American Games		
2027 Pacific Games		
PSA World Rankings		
Universality Places		
Final World Qualifying Tournament		
Total	16	16
