= Argentina at the 2027 Pan American Games =

- IOC code: ARG
- NOC: Argentinian Olympic Committee

in Lima, Peru 2027 – 2027
- Competitors: 196 in 13 sports
- Medals: Gold 0 Silver 0 Bronze 0 Total 0

Pan American Games appearances (overview)
- 1951; 1955; 1959; 1963; 1967; 1971; 1975; 1979; 1983; 1987; 1991; 1995; 1999; 2003; 2007; 2011; 2015; 2019; 2023; 2027

Argentina is scheduled to compete at the 2027 Pan American Games in Lima, Peru from July 23 to August 8, 2027. This will be Argentina's 20th appearance at the Pan American Games, having competed at every edition of the games since the inaugural edition in 1951.

== Competitors ==
The following is the list of number of competitors (per gender) participating at the games per sport/discipline.

Sport	Men	Women	Total
Archery	1	1	2
Boxing	1	2	3
Equestrian			10
Fencing	9	7	16
Field hockey	16	16	32
Football	0	18	18
Gymnastics	7	8	15
Handball	14	14	28
Rugby sevens	12	12	24
Sailing	7	8	15
Squash	3	3	6
Table tennis	3	0	3
Volleyball	12	12	24
Total	85	101	196

== Archery ==
Argentina qualified two recurve archers (one man and one woman) through the 2026 Pan American Archery Championships and the 2026 South American Games.

Athlete	Event	Ranking Round		Round of 32	Round of 16	Quarterfinals	Semifinals	Final / BM	Rank
Athlete	Event	Score	Seed	Opposition Score	Opposition Score	Opposition Score	Opposition Score	Opposition Score	Rank
	Men's individual recurve								
	Women's individual recurve								
	Mixed team recurve			—N/a					

== Boxing ==
Argentina qualified 3 boxers (one man and two women) after they reached the semifinals at the 2026 Pan American Boxing Championship.

Athlete	Event	Quarterfinal	Semifinal	Final	
Athlete	Event	Opposition Result	Opposition Result	Opposition Result	Rank
	Men's –60 kg				
	Women's –57 kg				
	Women's –65 kg				

== Equestrian ==
Argentina qualified a team of 10 equestrians (two in Dressage, four in Eventing and four in Jumping).

=== Dressage ===
Athlete	Horse	Event	Prix St. Georges		Grand Prix Special			Grand Prix Freestyle	
Athlete	Horse	Event	Score	Rank	Score	Total	Rank	Score	Rank
		Individual				—N/a			

=== Eventing ===
Athlete	Horse	Event	Dressage		Cross-country			Jumping			Total	
Athlete	Horse	Event	Result	Rank	Penalties	Total	Rank	Penalties	Total	Rank	Penalties	Rank
		Individual										
		Team			—N/a			—N/a			—N/a	

=== Jumping ===
Athlete	Horse	Event	Qualification											Final							
Athlete	Horse	Event	Round 1			Round 2.1			Round 2.2			Total		Round A			Round B			Total	
Athlete	Horse	Event	Faults	Result Time	Rank	Faults	Result Time	Rank	Faults	Result Time	Rank	Faults	Rank	Faults	Result Time	Rank	Faults	Result Time	Rank	Faults	Rank
		Individual																			
		Team		—N/a			—N/a			—N/a				—N/a							

== Fencing ==
Argentina qualified a team of 16 fencers (nine men and seven women), after five teams finished at least in the top seven and a female athlete achieved an individual spot at the 2026 Pan American Fencing Championships in Lima, Peru.

Men

Athlete	Event	Pool Round		Round of 16	Quarterfinals	Semifinals	Final	
Athlete	Event	Victories	Seed	Opposition Score	Opposition Score	Opposition Score	Opposition Score	Rank
	Individual épée							
	Individual foil							
	Individual sabre							
	Team épée	—N/a						
	Team foil	—N/a						
	Team sabre	—N/a						

Women

Athlete	Event	Pool Round		Round of 16	Quarterfinals	Semifinals	Final	
Athlete	Event	Victories	Seed	Opposition Score	Opposition Score	Opposition Score	Opposition Score	Rank
	Individual épée							
Daniela Espinoza	Individual foil							
	Individual sabre							
	Team épée	—N/a						
	Team sabre	—N/a						

== Field hockey ==
Argentina qualified both men's and women's teams as they claimed gold medal at the 2025 Junior Pan American Games.

Summary

Team	Event	Group stage				Semifinal	Final / BM / Pl.	
Team	Event	Opposition Result	Opposition Result	Opposition Result	Rank	Opposition Result	Opposition Result	Rank
Argentina men	Men's tournament							
Argentina women	Women's tournament							

== Football ==
Argentina qualified a women's team after finishing 3rd at the 2025 Copa America Femenina.

Summary

Key:

- A.E.T – After extra time.
- P – Match decided by penalty-shootout.

Team	Event	Group Stage				Semifinal	Final / BM	
Team	Event	Opposition Score	Opposition Score	Opposition Score	Rank	Opposition Score	Opposition Score	Rank
Argentina women's	Women's tournament							

== Gymnastics ==
=== Artistic ===
Argentina qualified a team of ten gymnasts in artistic (five men and five women) at the 2026 Pan American Artistic Gymnastics Championships.

Men

Team & Individual Qualification

Athlete	Event	Final							
Athlete	Event	Apparatus						Total	Rank
Athlete	Event	F	PH	R	V	PB	HB	Total	Rank
	Team								
Total	Team								

Qualification Legend: Q = Qualified to apparatus final

Women

Team & Individual Qualification

Athlete	Event	Final					
Athlete	Event	Apparatus				Total	Rank
Athlete	Event	V	UB	BB	F	Total	Rank
	Team						
Total	Team						

Qualification Legend: Q = Qualified to apparatus final

=== Rhythmic ===
Argentina qualified two individual gymnasts in rhythmic gymnasts at the 2026 Pan American Rhythmic Gymnastics Championships.

Individual

Athlete	Event	Apparatus				Total	
Athlete	Event	Ball	Clubs	Hoop	Ribbon	Score	Rank
	All-around						

=== Trampoline ===
Argentina qualified three gymnasts in trampoline (two men and one woman) at the 2026 Pan American Trampoline and Tumbling Championships.

Men

Athlete	Event	Qualification		Final	
Athlete	Event	Score	Rank	Score	Rank
	Individual				
	Synchronized				

Women

Athlete	Event	Qualification		Final	
Athlete	Event	Score	Rank	Score	Rank
	Individual				

== Handball ==
Argentina qualified both men's and women's teams as they claimed gold medal at the 2026 South American Games.

Summary

Team	Event	Group stage				Semifinal	Final / BM / Pl.	
Team	Event	Opposition Result	Opposition Result	Opposition Result	Rank	Opposition Result	Opposition Result	Rank
Argentina men	Men's tournament							
Argentina women	Women's tournament							

== Rugby sevens ==
Argentina qualified a men's team (of 12 athletes) after winning the gold medal at the 2025 Junior Pan American Games and a women's team (of 12 athletes) after winning the gold medal at the 2026 South American Games.

Summary

Team	Event	Group stage				Semifinal	Final / BM / Pl.	
Team	Event	Opposition Result	Opposition Result	Opposition Result	Rank	Opposition Result	Opposition Result	Rank
Argentina men	Men's tournament							
Argentina women	Women's tournament							

== Sailing ==
Argentina qualified 10 boats for a total of 15 sailors.

Men

Athlete	Event	Opening series																		Finals				
Athlete	Event	1	2	3	4	5	6	7	8	9	10	11	12	13	14	15	16	Points	Rank	QF	SF	M / F	Points	Rank
	IQFoil																							
	ILCA 7											—N/a								—N/a				
	49er													—N/a						—N/a				
	Kite																			—N/a			—N/a	

Women

Athlete	Event	Opening series																		Finals				
Athlete	Event	1	2	3	4	5	6	7	8	9	10	11	12	13	14	15	16	Points	Rank	QF	SF	M / F	Points	Rank
	IQFoil																							
	ILCA 6											—N/a								—N/a				
	49erFX													—N/a						—N/a				
	Kite																			—N/a			—N/a	

Mixed

Athlete	Event	Race													Total	
Athlete	Event	1	2	3	4	5	6	7	8	9	10	11	12	M	Points	Rank
	Lightning											—N/a				
	Nacra 17															

== Squash ==
Argentina qualified a full team of six athletes (three men and three women) through the 2026 Pan American Squash Championships.

Men

Athlete	Event	Round of 32	Round of 16	Quarterfinal	Semifinal	Final / BM	
Athlete	Event	Opposition Result	Opposition Result	Opposition Result	Opposition Result	Opposition Result	Rank
	Singles						
	Doubles	—N/a					
	Team	—N/a					

Women

Athlete	Event	Round of 32	Round of 16	Quarterfinal	Semifinal	Final / BM	
Athlete	Event	Opposition Result	Opposition Result	Opposition Result	Opposition Result	Opposition Result	Rank
	Singles						
	Doubles	—N/a					
	Team	—N/a					

Mixed

Athlete	Event	Round of 16	Quarterfinal	Semifinal	Final / BM	
Athlete	Event	Opposition Result	Opposition Result	Opposition Result	Opposition Result	Rank
	Doubles					

== Table tennis ==
Argentina qualified a team of three male athletes through the 2026 Pan American Championships.

Men

Athlete	Event	Group stage			Round of 32	Round of 16	Quarterfinal	Semifinal	Final / BM	
Athlete	Event	Opposition Result	Opposition Result	Rank	Opposition Result	Opposition Result	Opposition Result	Opposition Result	Opposition Result	Rank
	Singles	—N/a								
	Singles	—N/a								
	Doubles	—N/a								
	Team				—N/a					

== Volleyball ==
=== Indoor ===
Argentina qualified a men's team after winning the 2026 Copa Sudamericana and a women's team after finishing second in the 2026 Women's South American Volleyball Championship.

Summary

Team	Event	Group stage				Semifinal	Final / BM / Pl.	
Team	Event	Opposition Result	Opposition Result	Opposition Result	Rank	Opposition Result	Opposition Result	Rank
Argentina men	Men's tournament							
Argentina women	Women's tournament							
