= Chile at the 2027 Pan American Games =

- IOC code: CHI
- NOC: Chilean Olympic Committee

in Lima, Peru 2027 – 2027
- Competitors: 122 in 12 sports
- Medals: Gold 0 Silver 0 Bronze 0 Total 0

Pan American Games appearances (overview)
- 1951; 1955; 1959; 1963; 1967; 1971; 1975; 1979; 1983; 1987; 1991; 1995; 1999; 2003; 2007; 2011; 2015; 2019; 2023; 2027

Chile is scheduled to compete at the 2027 Pan American Games in Lima, Peru from July 23 to August 8, 2027. This will be Chile's 20th appearance at the Pan American Games, having competed at every edition of the games since the inaugural edition in 1951.

== Competitors ==
The following is the list of number of competitors (per gender) participating at the games per sport/discipline.

Sport	Men	Women	Total
Archery	3	0	3
Equestrian			9
Fencing	9	8	17
Field hockey	16	16	32
Gymnastics	5	7	12
Handball	12	0	12
Rugby sevens	12	0	12
Sailing	2	3	5
Squash	3	0	3
Table tennis	0	3	3
Volleyball	12	0	12
Wrestling	1	1	2
Total	75	38	122

== Archery ==
Chile qualified a men's recurve team through the 2026 Pan American Archery Championships.

Men

Athlete	Event	Ranking Round		Round of 32	Round of 16	Quarterfinals	Semifinals	Final / BM	Rank
Athlete	Event	Score	Seed	Opposition Score	Opposition Score	Opposition Score	Opposition Score	Opposition Score	Rank
	Individual recurve								
	Team recurve			—N/a					

== Equestrian ==
Chile qualified a team of 9 equestrians (one in Dressage, four in Eventing and four in Jumping).

=== Dressage ===
Athlete	Horse	Event	Prix St. Georges		Grand Prix Special			Grand Prix Freestyle	
Athlete	Horse	Event	Score	Rank	Score	Total	Rank	Score	Rank
		Individual				—N/a			

=== Eventing ===
Athlete	Horse	Event	Dressage		Cross-country			Jumping			Total	
Athlete	Horse	Event	Result	Rank	Penalties	Total	Rank	Penalties	Total	Rank	Penalties	Rank
		Individual										
		Team			—N/a			—N/a			—N/a	

=== Jumping ===
Athlete	Horse	Event	Qualification											Final							
Athlete	Horse	Event	Round 1			Round 2.1			Round 2.2			Total		Round A			Round B			Total	
Athlete	Horse	Event	Faults	Result Time	Rank	Faults	Result Time	Rank	Faults	Result Time	Rank	Faults	Rank	Faults	Result Time	Rank	Faults	Result Time	Rank	Faults	Rank
		Individual																			
		Team		—N/a			—N/a			—N/a				—N/a							

== Fencing ==
Chile qualified a team of 17 fencers (nine men and eight women), after five teams finished at least in the top seven and a female athlete achieved an individual spot at the 2026 Pan American Fencing Championships in Lima, Peru. Another female athlete achieved an individual spot at the 2025 Junior Pan American Games

Men

Athlete	Event	Pool Round		Round of 16	Quarterfinals	Semifinals	Final	
Athlete	Event	Victories	Seed	Opposition Score	Opposition Score	Opposition Score	Opposition Score	Rank
	Individual épée							
	Individual foil							
	Individual sabre							
	Team épée	—N/a						
	Team foil	—N/a						
	Team sabre	—N/a						

Women

Athlete	Event	Pool Round		Round of 16	Quarterfinals	Semifinals	Final	
Athlete	Event	Victories	Seed	Opposition Score	Opposition Score	Opposition Score	Opposition Score	Rank
	Individual épée							
Rafaela Santibañez	Individual foil							
Florencia Cabezas	Individual sabre							
	Team épée	—N/a						
	Team foil	—N/a						

== Field hockey ==
Chile qualified both men's and women's teams after being finalists at the 2026 South American Games.

Summary

Team	Event	Group stage				Semifinal	Final / BM / Pl.	
Team	Event	Opposition Result	Opposition Result	Opposition Result	Rank	Opposition Result	Opposition Result	Rank
Chile men	Men's tournament							
Chile women	Women's tournament							

== Gymnastics ==
=== Artistic ===
Chile qualified a team of seven gymnasts in artistic (five men and two women) at the 2026 Pan American Artistic Gymnastics Championships.

Men

Team & Individual Qualification

Athlete	Event	Final							
Athlete	Event	Apparatus						Total	Rank
Athlete	Event	F	PH	R	V	PB	HB	Total	Rank
	Team								
Total	Team								

Qualification Legend: Q = Qualified to apparatus final

Women

Athlete	Event	Qualification				Total	Rank
Athlete	Event	V	UB	BB	F	Total	Rank
	Individual all-around						

Qualification Legend: Q = Qualified to apparatus final

=== Rhythmic ===
Chile qualified five gymnasts for the group event in rhythmic at the 2026 Pan American Rhythmic Gymnastics Championships.

Group

Athlete	Event	Apparatus		Total	
Athlete	Event	5 balls	3 hoops + 2 clubs	Score	Rank
	All-around				

== Handball ==
Chile qualified a men's team after finishing second at the 2026 South American Games.

Summary

Team	Event	Group stage				Semifinal	Final / BM / Pl.	
Team	Event	Opposition Result	Opposition Result	Opposition Result	Rank	Opposition Result	Opposition Result	Rank
Chile men	Men's tournament							

== Rugby sevens ==
Chile qualified a men's team (of 12 athletes) after winning the silver medal at the 2026 South American Games.

Summary

Team	Event	Group stage				Semifinal	Final / BM / Pl.	
Team	Event	Opposition Result	Opposition Result	Opposition Result	Rank	Opposition Result	Opposition Result	Rank
Chile men	Men's tournament							

== Sailing ==
Chile qualified 3 boats for a total of 5 sailors.

Athlete	Event	Opening series																		Finals				
Athlete	Event	1	2	3	4	5	6	7	8	9	10	11	12	13	14	15	16	Points	Rank	QF	SF	M / F	Points	Rank
	ILCA 7											—N/a								—N/a				
	ILCA 6											—N/a								—N/a				
	Lightning											—N/a								—N/a				

== Squash ==
Chile qualified a male team of three athletes through the 2026 Pan American Squash Championships.

Men

Athlete	Event	Round of 32	Round of 16	Quarterfinal	Semifinal	Final / BM	
Athlete	Event	Opposition Result	Opposition Result	Opposition Result	Opposition Result	Opposition Result	Rank
	Singles						
	Doubles	—N/a					
	Team	—N/a					

== Table tennis ==
Chile qualified a team of three female athletes through the 2026 South American Games.

Women

Athlete	Event	Group stage			Round of 32	Round of 16	Quarterfinal	Semifinal	Final / BM	
Athlete	Event	Opposition Result	Opposition Result	Rank	Opposition Result	Opposition Result	Opposition Result	Opposition Result	Opposition Result	Rank
	Singles	—N/a								
	Singles	—N/a								
	Doubles	—N/a								
	Team				—N/a					

== Volleyball ==
=== Indoor ===
Chile qualified a men's team after finishing third in the 2026 Men's South American Volleyball Championship.

Summary

Team	Event	Group stage				Semifinal	Final / BM / Pl.	
Team	Event	Opposition Result	Opposition Result	Opposition Result	Rank	Opposition Result	Opposition Result	Rank
Chile men	Men's tournament							

== Wrestling ==
Chile qualified two wrestlers (one man and one woman) through the 2026 Pan American Wrestling Championships.

Key:

- VT – Victory by fall.
- PP – Decision by points – the loser with technical points.
- PO – Decision by points – the loser without technical points.
- SP – Technical superiority – the loser with technical points and a margin of victory of at least 9 (Greco-Roman) or 10 (freestyle) points.
- ST – Great superiority – the loser without technical points and a margin of victory of at least 8 (Greco-Roman) or 10 (freestyle) points.
- VA – Decision by withdrawal

Athlete	Event	Round of 16	Quarterfinal	Semifinal	Repechage	Final / BM	
Athlete	Event	Opposition Result	Opposition Result	Opposition Result	Opposition Result	Opposition Result	Rank
	Men's Greco-Roman 77 kg	Bye					
	Women's freestyle 68 kg	Bye					
