= Bowling at the 2027 Pan American Games =

Bowling at the Pan American Games
- Venue: Bowling Center
- Start date: August 5, 2027
- End date: August 8, 2027
- No. of events: 4 (2 men, 2 women)
- Competitors: 50 from 15 nations

Bowling competitions at the 2027 Pan American Games in Lima, Peru are scheduled to be held at the Bowling Center located in Sede Legado Videna (Villa Deportiva Nacional), in the San Luis district, in Lima, between August 5 and 8, 2027.

Four medal events are scheduled to be contested, a singles and doubles events for each men and women.

== Qualification ==
A total of 48 bowlers will qualify to compete. Each nation may enter a maximum of 4 athletes (two per gender). In each gender there will be a total of 12 pairs qualified, with one spot per event (so a total of four bowlers) reserved for the host nation Peru. There will be a total of two qualification events (2026 Central American and Caribbean Games and 2026 South American Games), each one awarding three (3) spots per gender.The remaining five (5) qualification spots for Lima 2027 will be determined via the confederation ranking, which began with the 2024 Elite Pan American Championship and includes two "Champion of Champions" events—one held in 2024 and another scheduled for 2026—as well as the Pan American Championships (Women’s, also in 2026; and Men’s, slated for the first half of 2027).

== Participating nations ==
A total of 10 countries qualified bowlers. The number of athletes a nation entered is in parentheses beside the name of the country.

- Aruba (2)
- Brazil (2)
- Colombia (2)
- Dominican Republic (2)
- Guatemala (2)
- Mexico (4)
- Panama (2)
- Peru (4)
- Puerto Rico (4)
- Venezuela (4)

== Medal table ==
* Host nation (Peru)

Rank	Nation	Gold	Silver	Bronze	Total
1	Peru*	0	0	0	0
Totals (1 entries)		0	0	0	0

=== Medalists ===
Event	Gold	Silver	Bronze
Men's singles			
Men's doubles			
Women's singles			
Women's doubles			
