= Archery at the 2027 Pan American Games =

Archery at the Pan American Games
- Venue: Archery Center
- Start date: August 4, 2027
- End date: August 8, 2027
- No. of events: 10 (4 men, 4 women, 2 mixed)
- Competitors: 102

Archery competitions at the 2027 Pan American Games in Lima, Peru will be held between August 4 and 8, 2027.

The highest two ranked athletes in each individual recurve event (that had not yet qualified) will earn a quota spot for their country at the 2028 Summer Olympics in Los Angeles, United States along with the top mixed recurve team and the top mixed compound team.

== Qualification ==
A total of 102 archers will qualify to compete at the games (51 per gender). A country can enter a maximum of ten archers (five per gender). As host nation, Peru qualified eight athletes automatically (3 for the men’s and women's recurve event each, 1 for the men’s and women’s compound event each). Four qualification tournaments will be used to determine the 66 qualifiers in recurve and 36 in compound.

== Participating nations ==
A total of 14 countries qualified archers.

- Argentina (1)
- Brazil (8)
- Canada (2)
- Chile (3)
- Colombia (10)
- Cuba (1)
- Ecuador (1)
- El Salvador (3)
- Guatemala (6)
- Mexico (10)
- Peru (8)
- Puerto Rico (2)
- United States (10)
- Venezuela (1)

== Medal summary ==
=== Medal table ===
* Host nation (Peru)

Rank	NOC's	Gold	Silver	Bronze	Total
1	Peru*	0	0	0	0
Totals (1 entries)		0	0	0	0

=== Medalists ===
Recurve

Event	Gold	Silver	Bronze
Men's individual			
Men's team			
Women's individual			
Women's team			
Mixed team			

Compound

Event	Gold	Silver	Bronze
Men's individual			
Men's team			
Women's individual			
Women's team			
Mixed team			

== See also ==
- Archery at the 2027 Parapan American Games
- Archery at the 2028 Summer Olympics
