= Barbados at the 2027 Pan American Games =

- IOC code: BAR
- NOC: Barbados Olympic Association

in Lima, Peru 2027 – 2027
- Competitors: 3 in 1 sport
- Medals: Gold 0 Silver 0 Bronze 0 Total 0

Pan American Games appearances (overview)
- 1963; 1967; 1971; 1975; 1979; 1983; 1987; 1991; 1995; 1999; 2003; 2007; 2011; 2015; 2019; 2023

Barbados is scheduled to compete at the 2027 Pan American Games in Lima, Peru from July 23 to August 8, 2027. This will be Barbados' 17th appearance at the Pan American Games, having competed at every edition of the games since 1963.

== Competitors ==
The following is the list of number of competitors (per gender) participating at the games per sport/discipline.

| Sport | Men | Women | Total |
|---|---|---|---|
| Squash | 0 | 3 | 3 |
| Total | 0 | 3 | 3 |

== Squash ==
Barbados qualified a female team of three athletes through the 2026 Pan American Squash Championships.

Men

| Athlete | Event | Round of 32 | Round of 16 | Quarterfinal | Semifinal | Final / BM | |
| Athlete | Event | Opposition Result | Opposition Result | Opposition Result | Opposition Result | Opposition Result | Rank |
|---|---|---|---|---|---|---|---|
| | Singles | | | | | | |
| | Doubles | —N/a | | | | | |
| | Team | —N/a | | | | | |
