= Handball at the 2027 Pan American Games =

Handball at the Pan American Games
- Start date: July 24, 2027
- End date: August 7, 2027
- No. of events: 2 (1 men, 1 women)
- Competitors: 224 from 8 nations

Handball competitions at the 2027 Pan American Games in Lima, Peru are scheduled to be held from July 24 to August 7.

Each tournament will feature eight men's teams and eight women's teams, each with a maximum of 14 athletes. This indicates that 224 athletes will compete in total.

== Qualification ==
A total of eight men's teams and eight women's team will qualify to compete at the games in each tournament. The host nation (Peru) received automatic qualification in both tournaments. All other teams will qualify through various tournaments.

=== Summary ===
| Nation | Men's | Women's | Athletes |
|---|---|---|---|
| Argentina | Yes | Yes | 28 |
| Brazil | Yes | Yes | 28 |
| Chile | Yes | | 14 |
| Cuba | Yes | Yes | 28 |
| Dominican Republic | | Yes | 14 |
| Paraguay | | Yes | 14 |
| Peru | Yes | Yes | 28 |
| Puerto Rico | Yes | | 14 |
| United States | Yes | Yes | 28 |
| Total: 9 NOCs | 8 | 8 | 224 |

=== Men ===
| Event | Dates | Location | Quota(s) | Qualified |
|---|---|---|---|---|
| Host nation | —N/a | —N/a | 1 | Peru |
| 2025 Junior Pan American Games | 17–22 August | (Paraguay) Asunción | 1 | Brazil |
| 2026 Central American and Caribbean Games | 29 July – 7 August | (Dominican Republic) Santo Domingo | 2 | Cuba; Puerto Rico |
| 2026 South American Games | 22–26 September | (Argentina) Santa Fe | 2 | Argentina; Chile |
| USA–CAN Qualifying Round | 7–8 August 2026 | (United States) Sioux City | 1 | United States |
| Last chance qualification tournament | TBD | TBD | 1 | |
| Total | | | 8 | |

=== Women ===
| Event | Dates | Location | Quota(s) | Qualified |
|---|---|---|---|---|
| Host nation | —N/a | —N/a | 1 | Peru |
| 2025 Junior Pan American Games | 10–15 August | (Paraguay) Asunción | 1 | Brazil |
| 2026 Central American and Caribbean Games | 29 July – 6 August | (Dominican Republic) Santo Domingo | 2 | Cuba; Dominican Republic |
| 2026 South American Games | 16–20 September | (Argentina) Santa Fe | 2 | Argentina; Paraguay |
| USA–CAN Qualifying Round | 25–26 September 2026 | (Canada) La Prairie | 1 | United States |
| Last chance qualification tournament | TBD | TBD | 1 | |
| Total | | | 8 | |

== Medal summary ==
=== Medalists ===
| Event | Gold | Silver | Bronze |
|---|---|---|---|
| Men's tournament | | | |
| Women's tournament | | | |

== See also ==
- Handball at the 2028 Summer Olympics
