= Field hockey at the 2027 Pan American Games =

Field hockey at the Pan American Games
- Venues: Hockey Stadium, located in the South Cluster (Villa María del Triunfo)
- Start date: July 27, 2027
- End date: August 6, 2027
- No. of events: 2 (1 men, 1 women)
- Competitors: 256 from 9 nations

Field hockey competitions at the 2027 Pan American Games in Lima, Peru are scheduled to be held from 27 July to 6 August 2027. It will be the sixteenth edition of the field hockey event at the Pan American Games. A total of eight men's and eight women's teams (each consisting up to 16 athletes each) will compete in each tournament. The games will be played at the Hockey Stadium, located in the South Cluster (Villa María del Triunfo) in Lima.

The winner of each tournament will qualify for the 2024 Summer Olympics in Los Angeles, United States.

== Qualification ==
A total of eight men's and women's teams will qualify for the tournament. The hosts country Peru received automatic qualification in both tournaments. The top team at the 2025 Junior Pan American Games qualified. The top two teams at the 2026 Central American and Caribbean Games and 2026 South American Games also qualified. The top three teams not yet qualified from the 2025 Men's and Women's Pan American Cup (after the results from the above two tournaments are taken into account) also qualified. If the Canada and/or the United States have not qualified still, a playoff between the nations and the third ranked at the Pan American Cups will take place. If both nations do qualify, the playoff will be not necessary and the next best placed team at each Pan American Cup (that has not already qualified) will qualify.

=== Summary ===
Nation	Men's	Women's	Athletes
Argentina	Yes	Yes	32
Canada	Yes	Yes	32
Chile	Yes	Yes	32
Cuba	Yes	Yes	32
Mexico	Yes	Yes	32
Peru	Yes	Yes	32
Trinidad and Tobago	Yes		16
United States	Yes	Yes	32
Uruguay		Yes	16
Total: 9 NOCs	8	8	256

=== Men's qualification ===
Qualification	Date	Host	Quota(s)	Qualified team
Host country	—N/a		1	Peru
2025 Pan American Cup	24 July – 3 August	(Uruguay) Montevideo	1	United States
2025 Junior Pan American Games	10–18 August	(Paraguay) Asunción	1	Argentina
2026 Central American and Caribbean Games	27 July – 4 August	(Dominican Republic) Santo Domingo	2	Cuba; Trinidad and Tobago
2026 South American Games	3–11 October	(Argentina) Santa Fe	~~2~~ 1	Chile
Field Hockey World Ranking	30 September, 2026	—N/a	~~1~~ 2	Canada; Mexico
Total			8	

- Argentina finished in the top two at the 2026 South American Games, meaning that quota was reallocated as an additional quota through the Field Hockey World Ranking.

=== Women's qualification ===
Qualification	Date	Host	Quota(s)	Qualified team
Host country	—N/a		1	Peru
2025 Pan American Cup	24 July – 3 August	(Uruguay) Montevideo	1	United States
2025 Junior Pan American Games	11–19 August	(Paraguay) Asunción	1	Argentina
2026 Central American and Caribbean Games	26 July – 3 August	(Dominican Republic) Santo Domingo	2	Cuba; Mexico
2026 South American Games	4–12 October	(Argentina) Santa Fe	~~2~~ 1	Chile
Field Hockey World Ranking	30 September, 2026	—N/a	~~1~~ 2	Uruguay; Canada
Total			8	

- Argentina finished in the top two at the 2026 South American Games, meaning that quota was reallocated as an additional quota through the Field Hockey World Ranking.

== Medal summary ==
=== Medal table ===
* Host nation (Peru)

Rank	Nation	Gold	Silver	Bronze	Total
1	Peru*	0	0	0	0
Totals (1 entries)		0	0	0	0

=== Medalists ===
Event	Gold	Silver	Bronze
Men's tournament			
Women's tournament			

== See also ==
- Field hockey at the 2028 Summer Olympics
