= Football at the 2027 Pan American Games =

Football at the Pan American Games
- Venues: Estadio Universidad San Marcos
- Start date: July 25, 2027
- End date: August 7, 2027
- No. of events: 2 (1 men, 1 women)
- Competitors: 288

The Football competitions at the 2027 Pan American Games will take place between July 25 and August 7, 2027 at the Estadio Universidad San Marcos in Lima.

The Men's tournament will be an under-23 competition, while the Women's tournament won't have age restrictions.

== Qualification ==
A total of eight men's teams and eight women's teams qualified to compete at the games in each tournament. The host nation (Peru) qualified in each tournament, along with seven other teams in each tournament according to various qualifying criteria.

=== Summary ===
Nation	Men's	Women's	Athletes
Argentina		Yes	18
Costa Rica	Yes		18
Haiti	Yes		18
Peru	Yes	Yes	36
Mexico	Yes		18
Paraguay		Yes	18
United States	Yes		18
Uruguay		Yes	18
Total: 8 NOCs	8	8	288

=== Men ===
Event		Dates	Location	Quota(s)	Qualified
Host nation		—N/a	—N/a	1	Peru
2026 CONCACAF U-20 Championship	Champions	July 24 − August 9	Mexico	1	Mexico
2026 CONCACAF U-20 Championship	Top Caribbean team	July 24 − August 9	Mexico	1	Haiti
2026 CONCACAF U-20 Championship	Top Central American team	July 24 − August 9	Mexico	1	Costa Rica
2026 CONCACAF U-20 Championship	Top North American team	July 24 − August 9	Mexico	1	United States
2027 South American U-20 Championship		January 22 – February 7	Colombia	3	
Total				8	

=== Women ===
Event		Dates	Location	Quota(s)	Qualified
Host nation		—N/a	—N/a	1	Peru
2025 Copa América Femenina	3rd to 5th place	July 11 − August 2	Ecuador	3	Argentina; Uruguay; Paraguay
2026 CONCACAF W Championship	Champions	November 27 − December 5	United States	1	
2026 CONCACAF W Championship	Top Caribbean team	November 27 − December 5	United States	1	
2026 CONCACAF W Championship	Top Central American team	November 27 − December 5	United States	1	
2026 CONCACAF W Championship	Top North American team	November 27 − December 5	United States	1	
Total				8	

== Medal summary ==
=== Medal table ===
* Host nation (Peru)

Rank	Nation	Gold	Silver	Bronze	Total
1	Peru*	0	0	0	0
Totals (1 entries)		0	0	0	0

=== Medalists ===
Event	Gold	Silver	Bronze
Men's tournament			
Women's tournament			

== See also ==
- Football 5-a-side at the 2027 Parapan American Games
- Football 7-a-side at the 2027 Parapan American Games
- Football at the 2028 Summer Olympics
