= 2027 Pan American Games =

2027 edition of the Pan American Games

- Host: Lima, Peru
- Motto: Together We Shine Brighter; Spanish: Juntos brillamos más
- Nations: 41 (expected)
- Events: 38 sports
- Opening: 23 July 2027
- Closing: 8 August 2027
- Main venue: National Stadium of Peru
- Website: lima2027.org.pe

The 2027 Pan American Games (Spanish: Juegos Panamericanos de 2027), officially the XX Pan American Games (Spanish: XX Juegos Panamericanos) and commonly known as Lima 2027, is an upcoming international multi-sport event governed by the Panam Sports Organization. It will be held from 23 July to 8 August in Lima, the capital of Peru, eight years after the city hosted the 2019 Pan American Games.

Barranquilla, Colombia was initially announced as the host in August 2021. However, the city was stripped of its hosting rights in January 2024 after the country's Ministry of Sports failed to meet contractual obligations, as well as financial reasons.

== Bidding process ==
=== First selection ===
The bidding process to determine the host of the 2027 Pan American Games was to begin in January 2021. However, in July 2021, the president of Panam Sports Neven Ilic confirmed that the bidding process would be postponed until January 2022. The deadline to submit bids for the event was 15 November 2021.

==== Host city election ====
On 27 August 2021, at an event in Barranquilla, Colombia, it was announced, that after a round of direct negotiations, the city was signed as the host of the games.

Bidding results
City	NOC name	Votes
Barranquilla	Colombia	—N/a

- As part of the Olympic Agenda 2020 process, no bidding process was held. Barranquilla was appointed as host city.

==== Interested cities ====
- Buenos Aires, Argentina

Buenos Aires initially bid for the 2023 Pan American Games, but withdrew their bid for financial reasons. Gerardo Werthein, the president of the Argentine Olympic Committee (COA), stated, "I would like Argentina to present its Olympic candidacy for 2032, but for now, I'm only thinking about [the PanAm Games in] 2027."

- Santa Cruz de la Sierra, Bolivia

On 14 January 2019, the Minister of Sports of Bolivia, Tito Montaño expressed his interest for Bolivia to host the Pan American Games. Although a specific city was not designated, Montaño stated that a candidate city would be determined within the coming weeks since the announcement. Bolivia has never submitted a bid for the Pan American Games.

- Barranquilla, Colombia

On 24 October 2018, Mayor of Barranquilla Alejandro Char confirmed Barranquilla's interest in the 2023 Pan American Games. After a successful hosting of the 2018 Central American and Caribbean Games, Char was inspired to meet with Panam Sports President Neven Ilić Álvarez. After the meeting, Char told reporters, "After this meeting I'm feeling more calm, confident and sure than ever that we can do it ... We are going to do everything in our power to make the advancements to hold the Games that Barranquilla wants and deserves."

==== Barranquilla loses its rights as host city ====
After several rounds of negotiations regarding financial guarantees were frustrated, on 3 January 2024, Barranquilla was stripped of hosting rights by PanAm Sports. This loss of rights was the result of frustrated rounds of negotiations with the new Colombian national and local authorities headed by the Ministry of Sports failing to meet contractual obligations, as well as failing to arrange the financial guarantees to hold the event. PanAm Sports also considered legal action for damages of USD$8 million caused by no signature of the host city contract.

A few days after Barranquilla was removed, the president of the Colombian Olympic Committee Ciro Solano, made public that there was pressure from Paraguayan authorities for Colombia to have its rights as host revoked, as there were clear intentions from the city of Asunción to host the event as a replacement host. Solano claimed in an interview with AFP, "Paraguay has been insisting on holding the [2027 PanAm] Games since August".

=== Second selection ===
==== Host city election ====
The new host city was confirmed at a virtual Extraordinary General Assembly on 12 March 2024. Asunción would consequently face the Peruvian capital Lima, which had hosted the 2019 Games and was seen as a safe choice, given the little time available to organize the Games and the little need for additional works, in addition to the fact that only the new Pan-American Village would need to be built.

Bidding results
City	NOC name	Votes
Lima	Peru	28
Asunción	Paraguay	24

==== Confirmed candidates ====
- Asunción, Paraguay

Asunción hosted the 2025 Junior Pan American Games, and if it had won its bid to replace Barranquilla, it would have served as a dress rehearsal for the Games, as well as being the first time Paraguay has hosted the senior Pan American Games. As Paraguay is a landlocked country, it was proposed that the surfing events be held in El Salvador, as confirmed by the El Salvador Olympic Committee, which would have made it the first continental Central American country to host a Pan American Games event.

- Lima, Peru

Lima previously hosted the 2019 Pan American Games, and hosted the 2025 Bolivarian Games with Ayacucho. Their project will reuse almost all infrastructure from those Games, in line with Olympic Agenda 2020+5. The then president of Peru, Dina Boluarte, announced her support for the bid on 18 January 2024.

==== Previously interested cities ====
- São Paulo, Brazil

São Paulo previously hosted the 1963 Pan American Games and has expressed interest in bidding for the 2031 Pan American Games. Brazil last hosted the Pan American Games in 2007 in Rio de Janeiro.

- a joint bid by Jalisco and Nuevo León states, Mexico

Guadalajara, in the state of Jalisco, previously hosted the 2011 Pan American Games. On 16 January 2024, the Mexican Olympic Committee announced they would withdraw their bid for the 2036 Summer Olympics to focus on bidding for the Pan American Games and the Youth Olympic Games.

== The Games ==
=== Participating National Olympic Committees ===
All 41 nations of the Pan American Sports Organization are expected to compete.

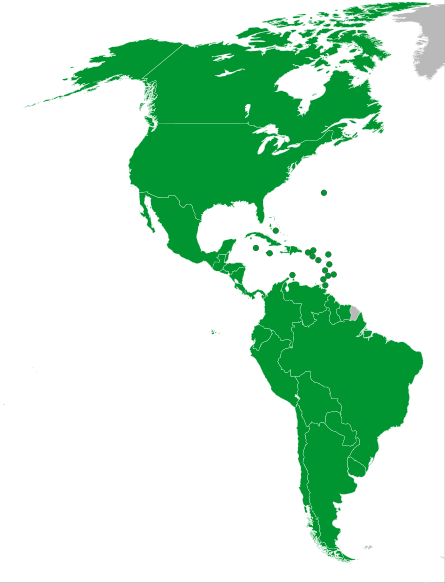
A map of all 41 participating nations

Participating National Olympic Committees
- Antigua and Barbuda
- Argentina
- Aruba
- Bahamas
- Barbados
- Belize
- Bermuda
- Bolivia
- Brazil
- British Virgin Islands
- Canada
- Cayman Islands
- Chile
- Colombia
- Costa Rica
- Cuba
- Dominica
- Dominican Republic
- Ecuador
- El Salvador
- Grenada
- Guatemala
- Guyana
- Haiti
- Honduras
- Jamaica
- Mexico
- Nicaragua
- Panama
- Paraguay
- Peru (host)
- Puerto Rico
- Saint Lucia
- Saint Kitts and Nevis
- Saint Vincent and the Grenadines
- Suriname
- Trinidad and Tobago
- United States
- Uruguay
- Venezuela
- Virgin Islands

=== Sports ===
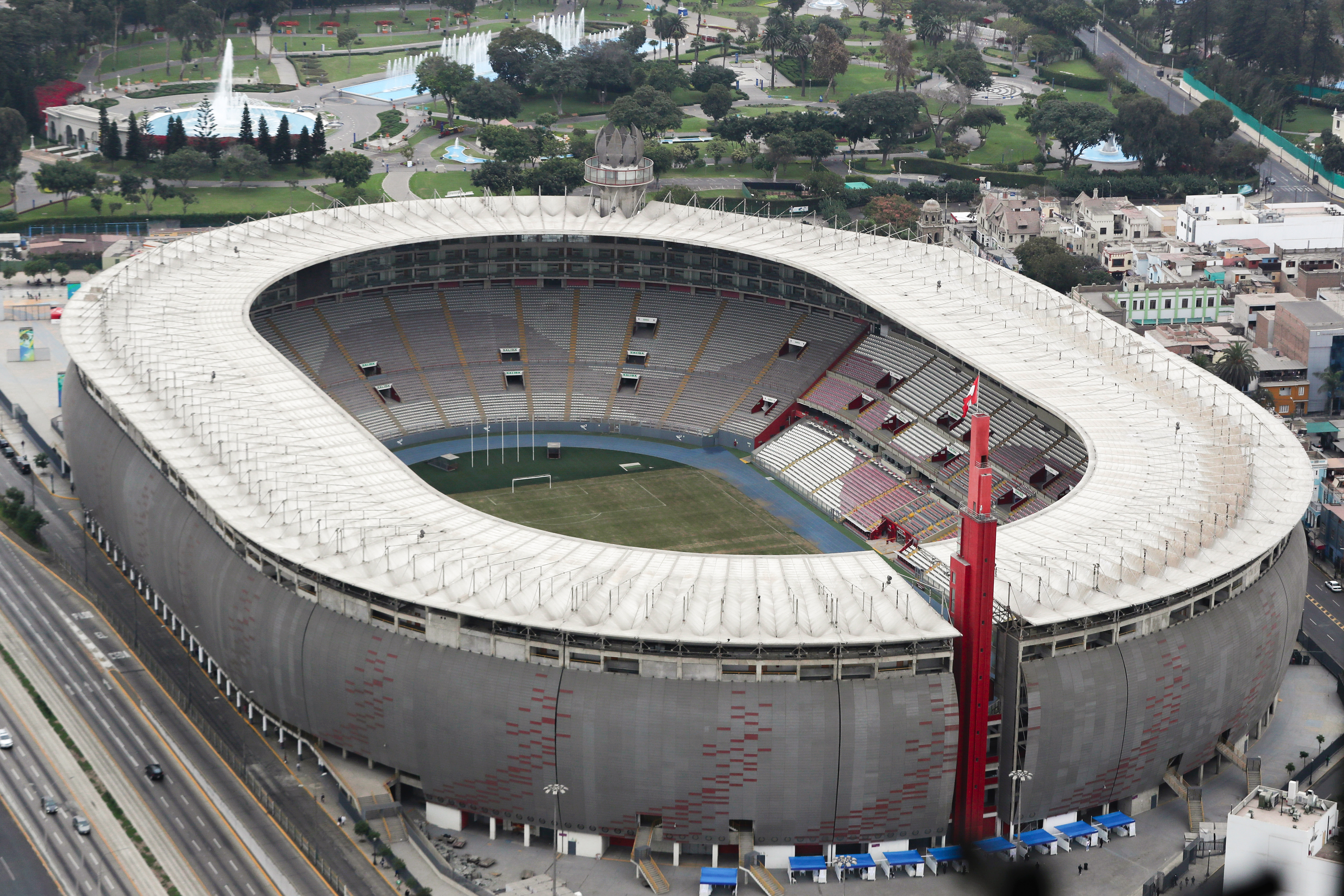
The Estadio Nacional is scheduled to host the opening and closing ceremonies

In October 2024, during the Panam Sports General Assembly held in Asunción, Paraguay, the International Cricket Council (ICC) made the formal proposal for cricket to be added to this edition's program, as it will be one of the five optional sports during the 2028 Summer Olympics. The final program of 36 sports was named on June 19, 2025. 33 sports were selected by the National Olympic Committees (NOC's), with the remaining three spots chosen by the Organizing Committee. The sports of basketball, breaking, bowling and racquetball were dropped from the 2023 edition of the games. Basketball will not be held for the first time ever at the Pan American Games. The sport was dropped from the sport program after a dispute with FIBA and Panam Sports, with the former wanting a youth tournament, and the latter not wanting to downgrade the prestige of the tournament. However, during the Panam Sports General Assembly in August 2025, bowling and racquetball were reinstated due at the request of several National Olympic Committees, bringing the number of sports to 38. Meanwhile, the sport of cricket will make its Pan American Games debut.

- Aquatics
  - Artistic swimming
  - Diving
  - Open water swimming
  - Swimming
  - Water polo
- Archery
- Athletics
- Badminton
- Baseball
  - Baseball
  - Softball
- Basque pelota
- Bowling
- Boxing
- Canoeing
  - Canoe sprint
  - Slalom canoeing
- Cricket
- Cycling
  - BMX freestyle
  - BMX racing
  - Mountain biking
  - Road cycling
  - Track cycling
- Equestrian
  - Dressage
  - Eventing
  - Jumping
- Fencing
- Field hockey
- Football
- Golf
- Gymnastics
  - Artistic gymnastics
  - Rhythmic gymnastics
  - Trampoline
- Handball
- Judo
- Karate
- Modern pentathlon
- Racquetball
- Roller sports
  - Artistic roller skating
  - Skateboarding
  - Inline speed skating
- Rowing
  - Coastal rowing
  - Rowing
- Rugby sevens
- Sailing
- Shooting
- Sport climbing
- Squash
- Surfing
- Table tennis
- Taekwondo
- Tennis
- Triathlon
- Volleyball
  - Beach volleyball
  - Volleyball
- Water skiing
  - Water skiing
  - Wakeboarding
- Weightlifting
- Wrestling
  - Freestyle wrestling
  - Greco-Roman wrestling

== Calendar ==
The preliminary sports schedule was released on May 14, 2026.

OC	Opening ceremony	●	Event competitions	1	Event finals	CC	Closing ceremony

July/August		21 Wed	22 Thu	23 Fri	24 Sat	25 Sun	26 Mon	27 Tue	28 Wed	29 Thu	30 Fri	31 Sat	1 Sun	2 Mon	3 Tue	4 Wed	5 Thu	6 Fri	7 Sat	8 Sun	Events
Ceremonies				OC																CC	—N/a
Aquatics	Artistic swimming																●		●	●	
Aquatics	Diving			●	●	●	●	●	●												
Aquatics	Open water swimming												2								2
Aquatics	Swimming						●	●	●	●	●										
Aquatics	Water polo													●	●	●	●	●	●		2
Archery																●	●	●	●	●	
Athletics					2	2								●	●	●	●	●	●		
Badminton																●	●	●	●	●	
Baseball	Baseball	●	●	●	●	●	●	●	●	●	●	1									1
Baseball	Softball												●	●	●	●	●	●	1		1
Basque pelota				●	●	●	●	●	●												
Bowling																	●	●	●	●	
Boxing					●	●	●	●	●	●											
Canoeing	Slalom										●	●	●								
Canoeing	Sprint																●	●	●	●	
Cricket			●	●	●	●	●	●	●	1		●	●	●	●	●	●	1			2
Cycling	BMX freestyle							●	1												2
Cycling	BMX racing				●	1															2
Cycling	Mountain biking										2										2
Cycling	Road												2							2	4
Cycling	Track														●	●	●	●			
Equestrian	Dressage				●	1		1													2
Equestrian	Eventing										●	●	2								2
Equestrian	Jumping													●	1		1				2
Fencing															2	2	2	2	2	2	12
Field hockey								●	●	●	●	●	●		●	●	1	1			2
Football						●	●		●	●		●	●		●	●		1	1		2
Golf																	●	●	●	●	
Gymnastics	Artistic														1	1	2	5	5		14
Gymnastics	Rhythmic					●	●	●													
Gymnastics	Trampoline					●	●														
Handball					●	●	●		●	1				●	●	●		●	1		2
Judo												●	●	●	●						
Karate																		●	●	●	
Modern pentathlon				●	●	●	●	●													
Racquetball				●	●	●	●	●	●												
Roller sports	Figure						●	●													
Roller sports	Skateboarding				●	●															
Roller sports	Speed				●	●															
Rowing	Coastal rowing																	●	●		
Rowing	Rowing				●	●	●	●	●												
Rugby sevens					●	●															2
Sailing							●	●	●	●	●	●	●								
Shooting				●	●	●	●	●	●	●	●										
Sport climbing					●	●	●	●													
Squash						●	●	●	●	●	●	●	●								
Surfing													●	●	●	●	●	●	●		
Table tennis					●	●	●	●	●	●	●	●									
Taekwondo					●	●	●	●													
Tennis							●	●	●	●	●	●	●								
Triathlon																	2		1		3
Volleyball	Beach											●	●	●	●	●	●	●			2
Volleyball	Indoor				●	●	●	●	●	1				●	●	●	●	●	1		2
Water skiing																●	●	●	●		
Weightlifting																●	●	●	●		
Wrestling																●	●	●	●		
Total events																					
Cumulative total																					—N/a
		21 Wed	22 Thu	23 Fri	24 Sat	25 Sun	26 Mon	27 Tue	28 Wed	29 Thu	30 Fri	31 Sat	1 Sun	2 Mon	3 Tue	4 Wed	5 Thu	6 Fri	7 Sat	8 Sun	Events

== Marketing ==
=== Emblem ===
The emblem was first unveiled on 6 August 2025, during the Panam Sports General Assembly held before the start of the 2025 Junior Pan American Games in Asunción, Paraguay. However, on 12 June 2026, a new emblem was unveiled, as the previous one was scrapped due to criticism alleging it was created using generative AI. According to the organizers, the new emblem draws inspiration from the welcoming, vibrant, and intimate nature of Lima.

=== Mascot ===
On 1 July 2026, after over 2,700 submissions, the organising committee revealed the final three in the running to be the mascot of the Games. The final three designs were: Rimo, a leaf-toed gecko, Kusi, a Galápagos sea lion, and Sisa, an amancaes flower. On 22 July, it was announced that Rimo was the winner of the contest, receiving roughly a third of the 30,123 votes cast in the contest.

== See also ==
- 2019 Pan American Games
- 2025 Bolivarian Games - held in Lima, with Ayacucho as host cities

Preceded by Santiago	XX Pan American Games; Lima (2027)	Succeeded by Asunción
