= Rugby sevens at the 2027 Pan American Games =

Rugby sevens at the Pan American Games
- Venue: Rugby Sevens Stadium
- Start date: July 24, 2027
- End date: July 25, 2027
- No. of events: 2 (1 men, 1 women)
- Competitors: 192 from 10 nations

The tournaments of rugby sevens at the 2023 Pan American Games are scheduled to be held in Lima, Peru in between July 24 and 25, 2027 at the Rugby Sevens Stadium, in the South Cluster (Villa María del Triunfo).

A total of eight men's and eight women's teams (each consisting up to 12 athletes) competed in each tournament. This means a total of 192 athletes were scheduled to compete.

== Qualification ==
Eight men's teams and eight women's teams qualified to compete at the games in each tournament. The host nation (Peru) received automatic qualification in both tournaments, along with seven other teams.

=== Summary ===
Nation	Men's	Women's	Athletes
Argentina	Yes	Yes	24
Brazil		Yes	12
Canada	Yes	Yes	24
Chile	Yes		12
Colombia		Yes	12
Peru	Yes	Yes	24
United States	Yes	Yes	24
Uruguay	Yes		12
Total: 10 NOCs	8	8	192

=== Men ===
Event	Dates	Location	Quota(s)	Qualified
Host Nation	—N/a	—N/a	1	Peru
2025 Junior Pan American Games	16–17 August	(Paraguay) Asunción	1	Argentina
Status in World Series	—N/a	—N/a	2	Canada; United States
2026 South American Games	18–20 September	(Argentina) Santa Fe	1	Chile
2026 Sudamérica Rugby Sevens	10–11 October	(Argentina) Cordoba	1	Uruguay
2026 RAN Super Sevens	27–29 November	(Trinidad and Tobago) TBD	2	
Total			8	

=== Women ===
Event	Dates	Location	Quota(s)	Qualified
Host Nation	—N/a	—N/a	1	Peru
2025 Junior Pan American Games	16–17 August	(Paraguay) Asunción	1	Brazil
2026 South American Games	18–20 September	(Argentina) Santa Fe	1	Argentina
Status in World Series	—N/a	—N/a	2	Canada; United States
2026 Sudamérica Rugby Sevens	10–11 October	(Argentina) Cordoba	1	Colombia
2026 RAN Super Sevens	27–29 November	(Trinidad and Tobago) TBD	2	
Total			8	

=== Medalists ===
Event	Gold	Silver	Bronze
Men's tournament			
Women's tournament			

== See also ==
- Rugby sevens at the 2028 Summer Olympics
