= El Salvador at the 2027 Pan American Games =

- IOC code: ESA
- NOC: El Salvador Olympic Committee

in Lima, Peru 2027 – 2027
- Competitors: 5 in 2 sports
- Medals: Gold 0 Silver 0 Bronze 0 Total 0

Pan American Games appearances (overview)
- 1951; 1955; 1959; 1963; 1967; 1971; 1975; 1979; 1983; 1987; 1991; 1995; 1999; 2003; 2007; 2011; 2015; 2019; 2023

El Salvador is scheduled to compete at the 2027 Pan American Games in Lima, Peru from July 23 to August 8, 2027. This will be El Salvador's 20th appearance at the Pan American Games, having competed at every edition of the games since the inaugural edition in 1951.

== Competitors ==
The following is the list of number of competitors (per gender) participating at the games per sport/discipline.

Sport	Men	Women	Total
Archery	2	1	3
Fencing	1	1	2
Total	3	2	5

== Archery ==
El Salvador qualified one recurve and two compound archers through the 2026 Pan American Archery Championships.

Athlete	Event	Ranking Round		Round of 32	Round of 16	Quarterfinals	Semifinals	Final / BM	Rank
Athlete	Event	Score	Seed	Opposition Score	Opposition Score	Opposition Score	Opposition Score	Opposition Score	Rank
	Men's individual recurve								
	Men's individual compound			—N/a					
	Women's individual compound			—N/a					
	Mixed team compound			—N/a					

== Fencing ==
El Salvador qualified two fencers (one per gender) at the 2026 Pan American Fencing Championships.

Athlete	Event	Pool Round		Round of 16	Quarterfinals	Semifinals	Final	
Athlete	Event	Victories	Seed	Opposition Score	Opposition Score	Opposition Score	Opposition Score	Rank
Saul Villacorta	Men's individual épée							
Ariana Fuentes	Women's individual foil							
