= Table tennis at the 2027 Pan American Games =

Table tennis at the Pan American Games
- Venue: Poliesportivo 3
- Start date: July 24, 2027
- End date: July 31, 2027
- No. of events: 7 (3 men, 3 women, 1 mixed)
- Competitors: 88

Table tennis competitions at the 2027 Pan American Games in Lima, Peru are scheduled to be held between July 24 and 31, 2023 at the Poliesportivo 3 located at Lima.

Seven medal events are scheduled to be contested, two singles events, three doubles events and two team events.

== Qualification system ==
A total of 88 athletes will qualify to compete (44 men and 44 women). Each nation may enter a maximum of 6 athletes (three per gender). In each gender there will be a total of 12 teams qualified, with one team per event reserved for the host nation Peru. Six places will be allocated for singles events (by gender) to athletes that have obtained the best results at the qualification tournament for singles events of the Pan American Games. Athletes qualified through various qualifying events.

The top team (for men and women) at the 2026 South American Games, the top two teams (not already qualified) at the 2026 Pan American Championships, the top two teams (not already qualified) from the Caribbean, Central America, the top team from South America and the top team from North America, and the two best teams from the Special qualification event will each qualify a team. As stated earlier, Peru also qualified a team in each event. The last 6 spots will be awarded to individuals, with a maximum of two per nation.

== Participating nations ==
A total of 1 country qualified athletes.

- Peru (6)

== Medal summary ==
=== Medal table ===
* Host nation (Peru)

Rank	NOC's	Gold	Silver	Bronze	Total
1	Peru*	0	0	0	0
Totals (1 entries)		0	0	0	0

=== Medalists ===
Event	Gold	Silver	Bronze
Men's singles			
Men's doubles			
Men's team			
Women's singles			
Women's doubles			
Women's team			
Mixed doubles			

== See also ==
- Table tennis at the 2027 Parapan American Games
- Table tennis at the 2028 Summer Olympics
