= Wrestling at the 2027 Pan American Games =

Wrestling at the Pan American Games
- Venue: Coliseo Miguel Grau
- Start date: August 4, 2027
- End date: August 7, 2027
- No. of events: 18 (12 men, 6 women)
- Competitors: 163

Wrestling competitions at the 2027 Pan American Games in Lima, Peru will be held between August 4 and 7, 2027 at the Coliseo Miguel Grau in Callao.

The competition is split into two disciplines, Freestyle and Greco-Roman which will be further divided into different weight categories. Men will compete in both disciplines whereas women will only take part in the freestyle events, with 18 gold medals awarded (12 for men and six for women). Wrestling has been contested at every Pan American Games.

== Qualification ==
A total of 168 wrestlers will qualify to compete at the games. The winner of each weight category at the 2025 Junior Pan American Games in Asuncion, Paraguay qualified directly, along with the top four at the 2026 Pan American Wrestling Championships and 2027 Pan American Wrestling Championships. The host country (Peru) is guaranteed a spot in each event, but its athletes must compete in both the 2026 and 2027 Pan American Championship. If Peru does not qualify at any of the first two events, it will take the fourth spot available at the 2027 Pan American Championships. A further six wildcards (four men and two women) will be awarded to nations without any qualified athlete but took part in the qualification tournaments.

== Participating nations ==
A total of 1 country qualified wrestlers.

- Peru (18)

== Medal summary ==
=== Medal table ===
* Host nation (Peru)

Rank	NOC's	Gold	Silver	Bronze	Total
1	Peru*	0	0	0	0
Totals (1 entries)		0	0	0	0

=== Medalists ===
==== Men's freestyle ====
Event	Gold	Silver	Bronze
57 kg			
65 kg			
74 kg			
86 kg			
97 kg			
125 kg			

==== Men's Greco-Roman ====
Event	Gold	Silver	Bronze
60 kg			
67 kg			
77 kg			
87 kg			
97 kg			
130 kg			

==== Women's freestyle ====
Event	Gold	Silver	Bronze
50 kg			
53 kg			
57 kg			
62 kg			
68 kg			
76 kg			

== See also ==
- 2026 Pan American Wrestling Championships
- 2027 Pan American Wrestling Championships
- Wrestling at the 2028 Summer Olympics
