= Boxing at the 2027 Pan American Games =

Boxing at the Pan American Games
- Venue: Olympic Training Center
- Start date: July 24, 2027
- End date: July 29, 2027
- No. of events: 14 (7 men, 7 women)
- Competitors: 112

Boxing competitions at the 2027 Pan American Games in Lima, Peru will be held between July 24 and 29, 2027.

The competition will be split among 14 events, seven for each gender.

== Qualification system ==
A total of 112 boxers will qualify to compete at the games (eight per event). The host nation (Peru) received automatic qualification spots. The remainder of the spots were awarded through two qualifying tournaments.

== Participating nations ==
A total of 1 NOC entered boxers.

- Peru (14)

== Medal summary ==
=== Medal table ===
* Host nation (Chile)

| Rank | NOC's | Gold | Silver | Bronze | Total |
|---|---|---|---|---|---|
| 1 | Peru* | 0 | 0 | 0 | 0 |
| Totals (1 entries) | | 0 | 0 | 0 | 0 |

=== Medallists ===
==== Men ====
| Event | Gold | Silver | Bronze |
|---|---|---|---|
| 55 kg | | | |
| 60 kg | | | |
| 65 kg | | | |
| 70 kg | | | |
| 80 kg | | | |
| 90 kg | | | |
| +90 kg | | | |

==== Women ====
| Event | Gold | Silver | Bronze |
|---|---|---|---|
| 51 kg | | | |
| 54 kg | | | |
| 57 kg | | | |
| 60 kg | | | |
| 65 kg | | | |
| 70 kg | | | |
| 75 kg | | | |

== See also ==
- Boxing at the 2028 Summer Olympics
