= Gymnastics at the 2027 Pan American Games =

Gymnastics at the Pan American Games
- Venue: Polideportivo Luisa Estela Fuentes Quijandría
- Start date: July 25, 2027
- End date: August 7, 2027
- No. of events: 26 (10 men, 16 women)

Gymnastics competitions at the 2027 Pan American Games in Lima, Peru, will take place between July 25 and August 7, 2027, at the Polideportivo Luisa Estela Fuentes Quijandría.

The artistic competitions will take place between August 3 and 7. The rhythmic competition will take place between July 25 and 27. The trampoline competition will take place between July 25 and 26.

26 medal events will be contested; 14 in artistic gymnastics (eight for men, six for women), eight in rhythmic (all for women), and four in trampoline (two per gender).

== Qualification ==
A total of up to 201 gymnasts are allowed to compete (122 in artistic, 53 in rhythmic and 26 in trampoline). A nation may enter a maximum of 21 athletes across all disciplines (five in each gender for artistic, five athletes in rhythmic group, two in individual and two in each trampoline event). All individual gold medalists from the 2025 Junior Pan American Games in Asuncion, Paraguay also qualify in addition to the maximum quota per nation. All qualification was done via each discipline's 2026 Pan American Gymnastics Championships.

== Medal summary ==
=== Medal table ===
* Host nation (Peru)

Rank	Nation	Gold	Silver	Bronze	Total
1	Peru*	0	0	0	0
Totals (1 entries)		0	0	0	0

=== Artistic gymnastics ===
==== Men ====
Games	Gold	Silver	Bronze
Team all-around			
Individual all-around			
Floor exercise			
Pommel horse			
Rings			
Vault			
Parallel bars			
Horizontal bar			

==== Women ====
Event	Gold	Silver	Bronze
Team all-around			
Individual all-around			
Vault			
Uneven bars			
Balance beam			
Floor exercise			

=== Rhythmic gymnastics ===
==== Individual ====
Event	Gold	Silver	Bronze
Individual all-around			
Ball			
Clubs			
Hoop			
Ribbon			

==== Group ====
Event	Gold	Silver	Bronze
Group all-around			
5 balls			
3 hoops + 2 clubs			

=== Trampoline ===
Event	Gold	Silver	Bronze
Men's individual			
Men's synchronized			
Women's individual			
Women's synchronized			

== See also ==
- Gymnastics at the 2028 Summer Olympics
