= Sailing at the 2027 Pan American Games =

Sailing at the Pan American Games
- Start date: July 26, 2027
- End date: August 1, 2027
- No. of events: 14 (5 men, 5 women, 4 mixed)
- Competitors: 189

Sailing competitions at the 2027 Pan American Games in Lima, Peru are schedule to take place between July 26 and August 1, 2027 in the city of Callao.

A total of 14 events will be contested, one more than in the 2023 Pan American Games. The 470 will make its return to the games with a mixed event.

A total of 189 sailors (89 men and 100 women) are scheduled to compete.

The top three placing athletes (not already qualified) from North America and South America in the men's ILCA 7 and women's ILCA 6 will qualify for the sailing competitions at the 2028 Summer Olympics in Los Angeles, United States (with the sailing competitions scheduled to be held in Belmont Shore and San Pedro), along with the top boat in each region in the windsurfing, kites, 49er, 49erfx, 470 and Nacra 17 events will also qualify.

== Qualification ==
A total of 189 sailors (89 men and 100 women) will qualify to compete at the games. A nation may enter a maximum of one boat in each of the 14 events and a maximum of 21 athletes (ten men and eleven women). Each event had different qualifying events that began in 2025. The host nation (Peru) automatically qualified in all 14 events (21 athletes). More women will qualify to compete for the second time ever, after the lightning class maintained a two women and one man format for each boat. The winner of each sailing event at the 2025 Junior Pan American Games, directly qualified as well. Countries earning a spot at the 2025 Junior Pan American Games, can earn another boat in that respective event. The slot awarded at the games is to the athlete, and cannot be transferred to another athlete. A total of four universality quotas were available (two each in the laser and laser radial events).

== Medal summary ==
=== Medal table ===
* Host nation (Peru)

Rank	noc	Gold	Silver	Bronze	Total
1	Peru*	0	0	0	0
Totals (1 entries)		0	0	0	0

=== Medalists ===
==== Men's events ====
Event	Gold	Silver	Bronze
IQFoil			
ILCA 7			
49er			
Sunfish			
Kite			

==== Women's events ====
Event	Gold	Silver	Bronze
IQFoil			
ILCA 6			
49erFX			
Sunfish			
Kite			

==== Mixed events ====
Event	Gold	Silver	Bronze
470			
Snipe			
Lightning			
Nacra 17			

== See also ==
- Sailing at the 2028 Summer Olympics
