= Peru at the 2027 Pan American Games =

- IOC code: PER
- NOC: Peru Olympic Committee

in Lima, Peru 2027 – 2027
- Competitors: 261 in 14 sports
- Medals: Gold 0 Silver 0 Bronze 0 Total 0

Pan American Games appearances (overview)
- 1951; 1955; 1959; 1963; 1967; 1971; 1975; 1979; 1983; 1987; 1991; 1995; 1999; 2003; 2007; 2011; 2015; 2019; 2023; 2027

Peru is scheduled to compete at the 2027 Pan American Games in Lima, Peru from July 23 to August 8, 2027. This will be Peru's 19th appearance at the Pan American Games, having competed at every Games since 1951, except for the second edition in 1955.

== Competitors ==
The following is the list of number of competitors (per gender) participating at the games per sport/discipline.

Sport	Men	Women	Total
Archery	4	4	8
Bowling	2	2	4
Boxing	7	7	14
Equestrian			12
Fencing	10	9	19
Field hockey	16	16	32
Football	18	18	36
Gymnastics	5	12	17
Handball	14	14	28
Rugby sevens	12	12	24
Sailing	10	11	21
Softball	0	16	16
Squash	3	3	6
Volleyball	12	12	24
Total	113	136	261

== Archery ==
Peru qualified two recurve teams and two compound archers (one man and one woman) as host nation.

Men

Athlete	Event	Ranking Round		Round of 32	Round of 16	Quarterfinals	Semifinals	Final / BM	Rank
Athlete	Event	Score	Seed	Opposition Score	Opposition Score	Opposition Score	Opposition Score	Opposition Score	Rank
	Individual recurve								
	Individual compound			—N/a					
	Team recurve			—N/a					

Women

Athlete	Event	Ranking Round		Round of 32	Round of 16	Quarterfinals	Semifinals	Final / BM	Rank
Athlete	Event	Score	Seed	Opposition Score	Opposition Score	Opposition Score	Opposition Score	Opposition Score	Rank
	Individual recurve								
	Individual compound			—N/a					
	Team recurve			—N/a					

Mixed

Athlete	Event	Ranking Round		Round of 32	Round of 16	Quarterfinals	Semifinals	Final / BM	Rank
Athlete	Event	Score	Seed	Opposition Score	Opposition Score	Opposition Score	Opposition Score	Opposition Score	Rank
	Team recurve			—N/a					
	Team compound			—N/a					

== Bowling ==
Peru qualified a full team of four bowlers (two men and two women) as host nation.

Men

Athlete	Event	Ranking round																		Semifinal	Final	
Athlete	Event	Block 1								Block 2								Total	Rank	Opposition Result	Opposition Result	Rank
Athlete	Event	1	2	3	4	5	6	7	8	9	10	11	12	13	14	15	16	Total	Rank	Opposition Result	Opposition Result	Rank
	Singles																					
	Doubles																			—N/a		

Women

Athlete	Event	Ranking round																		Semifinal	Final	
Athlete	Event	Block 1								Block 2								Total	Rank	Opposition Result	Opposition Result	Rank
Athlete	Event	1	2	3	4	5	6	7	8	9	10	11	12	13	14	15	16	Total	Rank	Opposition Result	Opposition Result	Rank
	Singles																					
	Doubles																			—N/a		

== Boxing ==
Peru qualified 14 boxers (seven men and seven women) as host nation.

Men

Athlete	Event	Quarterfinal	Semifinal	Final	
Athlete	Event	Opposition Result	Opposition Result	Opposition Result	Rank
	–55 kg				
	–60 kg				
	–65 kg				
	–70 kg				
	–80 kg				
	–90 kg				
	+90 kg				

Women

Athlete	Event	Quarterfinal	Semifinal	Final	
Athlete	Event	Opposition Result	Opposition Result	Opposition Result	Rank
	–51 kg				
	–54 kg				
	–57 kg				
	–60 kg				
	–65 kg				
	–70 kg				
	–75 kg				

== Equestrian ==
Peru qualified a full team of 12 equestrians (four in Dressage, Eventing and Jumping) as host nation.

=== Dressage ===
Athlete	Horse	Event	Prix St. Georges		Grand Prix Special			Grand Prix Freestyle	
Athlete	Horse	Event	Score	Rank	Score	Total	Rank	Score	Rank
		Individual				—N/a			
		Team						—N/a	

=== Eventing ===
Athlete	Horse	Event	Dressage		Cross-country			Jumping			Total	
Athlete	Horse	Event	Result	Rank	Penalties	Total	Rank	Penalties	Total	Rank	Penalties	Rank
		Individual										
		Team			—N/a			—N/a			—N/a	

=== Jumping ===
Athlete	Horse	Event	Qualification											Final							
Athlete	Horse	Event	Round 1			Round 2.1			Round 2.2			Total		Round A			Round B			Total	
Athlete	Horse	Event	Faults	Result Time	Rank	Faults	Result Time	Rank	Faults	Result Time	Rank	Faults	Rank	Faults	Result Time	Rank	Faults	Result Time	Rank	Faults	Rank
		Individual																			
		Team		—N/a			—N/a			—N/a				—N/a							

== Fencing ==
Peru qualified a full team of 18 fencers (nine men and nine women) as host nation. Another male athlete achieved an individual spot at the 2025 Junior Pan American Games.

Men

Athlete	Event	Pool Round		Round of 16	Quarterfinals	Semifinals	Final	
Athlete	Event	Victories	Seed	Opposition Score	Opposition Score	Opposition Score	Opposition Score	Rank
	Individual épée							
Renzo Furukawa	Individual foil							
	Individual sabre							
	Team épée	—N/a						
	Team foil	—N/a						
	Team sabre	—N/a						

Women

Athlete	Event	Pool Round		Round of 16	Quarterfinals	Semifinals	Final	
Athlete	Event	Victories	Seed	Opposition Score	Opposition Score	Opposition Score	Opposition Score	Rank
	Individual épée							
	Individual foil							
	Individual sabre							
	Team épée	—N/a						
	Team foil	—N/a						
	Team sabre	—N/a						

== Field hockey ==
Peru qualified both men's and women's teams as host nation.

Summary

Team	Event	Group stage				Semifinal	Final / BM / Pl.	
Team	Event	Opposition Result	Opposition Result	Opposition Result	Rank	Opposition Result	Opposition Result	Rank
Peru men	Men's tournament							
Peru women	Women's tournament							

== Football ==
Peru qualified both men's and women's teams as host nation.

Summary

Key:

- A.E.T – After extra time.
- P – Match decided by penalty-shootout.

Team	Event	Group Stage				Semifinal	Final / BM	
Team	Event	Opposition Score	Opposition Score	Opposition Score	Rank	Opposition Score	Opposition Score	Rank
Peru men's	Men's tournament							
Peru women's	Women's tournament							

== Gymnastics ==
=== Artistic ===
Peru qualified a team of ten gymnasts in artistic (five men and five women) as host nation. The last two spots were awarded to the next two best placed nations. The host nation Peru was guaranteed a spot for its best ranked athlete (male or female), if it failed to qualify (only if it competed at the 2026 Pan American Trampoline Championships).

Men

Team & Individual Qualification

Athlete	Event	Final							
Athlete	Event	Apparatus						Total	Rank
Athlete	Event	F	PH	R	V	PB	HB	Total	Rank
	Team								
Total	Team								

Qualification Legend: Q = Qualified to apparatus final

Women

Team & Individual Qualification

Athlete	Event	Final					
Athlete	Event	Apparatus				Total	Rank
Athlete	Event	V	UB	BB	F	Total	Rank
	Team						
Total	Team						

Qualification Legend: Q = Qualified to apparatus final

=== Rhythmic ===
Peru qualified one individual gymnast and five gymnasts for the group event in rhythmic as host nation.

Individual

Athlete	Event	Apparatus				Total	
Athlete	Event	Ball	Clubs	Hoop	Ribbon	Score	Rank
	All-around						

Group

Athlete	Event	Apparatus		Total	
Athlete	Event	5 balls	3 hoops + 2 clubs	Score	Rank
	All-around				

=== Trampoline ===
Peru qualified one gymnast in trampoline as host nation.

Athlete	Event	Qualification		Final	
Athlete	Event	Score	Rank	Score	Rank
	Women's individual				

== Handball ==
Peru qualified both men's and women's teams as host nation.

Summary

Team	Event	Group stage				Semifinal	Final / BM / Pl.	
Team	Event	Opposition Result	Opposition Result	Opposition Result	Rank	Opposition Result	Opposition Result	Rank
Peru men	Men's tournament							
Peru women	Women's tournament							

== Rugby sevens ==
Peru qualified a men's team and a women's team (of 12 athletes each) as host nation.

Summary

Team	Event	Group stage				Semifinal	Final / BM / Pl.	
Team	Event	Opposition Result	Opposition Result	Opposition Result	Rank	Opposition Result	Opposition Result	Rank
Peru men	Men's tournament							
Peru women	Women's tournament							

== Sailing ==
Peru qualified 14 boats for a total of 21 sailors as host nation.

Men

Athlete	Event	Opening series																		Finals				
Athlete	Event	1	2	3	4	5	6	7	8	9	10	11	12	13	14	15	16	Points	Rank	QF	SF	M / F	Points	Rank
	IQFoil																							
	ILCA 7											—N/a								—N/a				
	49er													—N/a						—N/a				
	Kite																			—N/a			—N/a	
	Men's sunfish											—N/a												

Women

Athlete	Event	Opening series																		Finals				
Athlete	Event	1	2	3	4	5	6	7	8	9	10	11	12	13	14	15	16	Points	Rank	QF	SF	M / F	Points	Rank
	IQFoil																							
	ILCA 6											—N/a								—N/a				
	49erFX													—N/a						—N/a				
	Kite																			—N/a			—N/a	
	Women's sunfish											—N/a												

Mixed

Athlete	Event	Race													Total	
Athlete	Event	1	2	3	4	5	6	7	8	9	10	11	12	M	Points	Rank
	Mixed 470															
	Lightning											—N/a				
	Nacra 17															
	Snipe															

== Softball ==
Peru qualified a women's team (of 16 athletes) as host nation.

Team	Event	Preliminary round				Super Round			Final / BM / Pl.	
Team	Event	Opposition Result	Opposition Result	Opposition Result	Rank	Opposition Result	Opposition Result	Rank	Opposition Result	Rank
Peru women	Women's tournament									

== Squash ==
Peru qualified a full team of six athletes (three men and three women) as host nation.

Men

Athlete	Event	Round of 32	Round of 16	Quarterfinal	Semifinal	Final / BM	
Athlete	Event	Opposition Result	Opposition Result	Opposition Result	Opposition Result	Opposition Result	Rank
	Singles						
	Doubles	—N/a					
	Team	—N/a					

Women

Athlete	Event	Round of 32	Round of 16	Quarterfinal	Semifinal	Final / BM	
Athlete	Event	Opposition Result	Opposition Result	Opposition Result	Opposition Result	Opposition Result	Rank
	Singles						
	Doubles	—N/a					
	Team	—N/a					

Mixed

Athlete	Event	Round of 16	Quarterfinal	Semifinal	Final / BM	
Athlete	Event	Opposition Result	Opposition Result	Opposition Result	Opposition Result	Rank
	Doubles					

== Volleyball ==
=== Indoor ===
Peru qualified both men's and women's teams as host nation.

Summary

Team	Event	Group stage				Semifinal	Final / BM / Pl.	
Team	Event	Opposition Result	Opposition Result	Opposition Result	Rank	Opposition Result	Opposition Result	Rank
Peru men	Men's tournament							
Peru women	Women's tournament							
