= Squash at the 2027 Pan American Games =

Squash at the Pan American Games
- Venue: Centro de Alto Rendimiento
- Start date: July 25, 2027
- End date: August 1, 2027
- No. of events: 7 (3 men, 3 women, 1 mixed)
- Competitors: 74

Squash competitions at the 2027 Pan American Games in Lima, Peru will be held at the Centro de Alto Rendimiento, in the Villa Deportiva Nacional cluster, from July 25 to August 1.

Seven medal events will be contested, a singles, doubles and team event for each gender along with a mixed doubles event.

== Qualification ==
A total of 74 squash athletes (37 men and 37 women) will qualify to compete. Each nation may enter a maximum of 6 athletes (three per gender), except for the NOCs that have qualified in Asuncion 2025. The host nation, Peru automatically qualified the maximum team size. Other ten men's and women's teams (of three athletes) qualified through the 2026 Pan American Championships.

== Participating nations ==
A total of 1 country qualified athletes. The number of athletes a nation has entered is in parentheses beside the name of the country.

- Peru (6)

== Medal summary ==
=== Medal table ===
* Host nation (Peru)

Rank	NOC's	Gold	Silver	Bronze	Total
1	Peru*	0	0	0	0
Totals (1 entries)		0	0	0	0

== Medalists ==
=== Men's events ===
Event	Gold	Silver	Bronze
Singles			
Doubles			
Team			

=== Women's events ===
Event	Gold	Silver	Bronze
Singles			
Doubles			
Team			

=== Mixed events ===
Event	Gold	Silver	Bronze
Doubles			
