= Pedro Castro (racquetball) =

Canadian racquetball player (born 1991)

Personal information
- Nationality: Canadian, Chilean, Greek
- Born: August 5, 1991 (age 35) Montreal
- Height: 175 cm (5 ft 9 in)
- Weight: 84 kg (185 lb)

Sport
- Sport: Racquetball
- Turned pro: 2006
- Coached by: Rino Langelier

Achievements and titles
- National finals: 1st Doubles – 2016 2nd Singles – 2015 2nd Doubles – 2012, 2014 1st Singles 2021 (Chile)
- Highest world ranking: 5th World racquetball tour
Medal record
Men's Racquetball
Representing Canada
Pan Am Championships
Bronze medal – third place	2016 San Luis Potosí	Doubles

Pedro Castro (born August 5, 1991) is a Canadian retired racquetball player. He won Men's Doubles at the 2016 Canadian Racquetball Championships with Samuel Murray, and has been on the Canadian National Team from 2014 to 2020. In 2020, Castro announced he's retiring from racquetball to focus on baseball with the hopes of representing Chile at the 2023 Pan American Games.

== Junior Years ==
Castro first appeared on the podium at the Canadian Junior Championships in 2006, when he and Samuel Murray won Boys U14 Doubles. They were semi-finalists Boys U16 Doubles in 2007.

His first podium appearance in singles was at the 2008 Canadian Junior Championships, when he was 2nd in U16 to Jamie Slamko. Also in 2008, Castro and Murray won their 2nd doubles title, winning the Boys U16 Doubles division.

In 2009, he was a semi-finalist in both singles and doubles.

Castro closed out his junior years with a bang, as he won the Boys' U18 Singles title at the 2010 Canadian Junior Championships, when he defeated Jamie Slamko in the final, 14–16, 15–11, 12–10. That was his only Canadian Junior singles title. He was also in the Boys' U18 Doubles final with Murray, but they lost to Slamko and Kevin Caouette, 15–6, 15–13 in the final.

He followed up that U18 Singles Canadian title by reaching the U18 Singles final at the 2010 International Racquetball Federation (IRF) World Junior Championships in Los Angeles, where he lost to the USA's Taylor Knoth, 15–13, 15–8. He was also on the podium in Boys' U18 Doubles, as he and Jamie Slamko were bronze medalists. Castro became the only Canadian to reach the final in the boys' U18 in singles at the World Junior Championships . Thus, Castro closed his junior years by becoming Canadian Champion and winning two medals at World Juniors.

== Career begins (2008–2011) ==
Castro was still a junior when he played in his first National Team Doubles Selection Event in January 2008, when Castro and Samuel Murray lost in the Round of 16 to Lee Connell and Eric Desrochers, 15–9, 15–4, and ended up finishing 11th.

Castro played at the Canadian Championships for the first time in 2008 in Burlington, Ontario, where he lost in the Round of 32 to Josh Keil, 15–7, 15–1.

In the 2008–09 season, Castro lost to Jamie Slamko, 15–13, 15–6, in the Round of 32 at the 2009 National Team Selection Event in Brossard, Québec. Then at the 2009 Canadian Championships in Edmonton, Castro lost in the Round of 16 to Vincent Gagnon, 15–8, 5–15, 11–2. He played doubles with Jérôme Normand, and they lost to Kris Odegard and Ryan Smith in the Round of 16, 15–5, 15–5.

In January 2010 in Brossard, Québec, Castro defeated Josh Keil in the Round of 32, then lost to Mike Green, 15–8, 15–7. But at the 2010 Canadian Championships in Burnaby, British Columbia, Castro had a then career best result, as he reached the quarterfinals for the first time. Seeded 12th, he upset 5th seed Eric Desrochers, 15–13, 15–11, in the Round of 16, then in the quarters, he lost to Tim Landeryou, 15–10, 15–5. In doubles, Castro and Kurtis Cullen teamed up and were seeded 8th, but they lost in the Round of 16 to 9th seeds Lee Connell and Josh Keil, 13–15, 15–3, 11–8.

At the second selection of the 2010–11 season in Brossard, Québec, Castro reached the quarterfinals, where he lost to Vincent Gagnon, 15–9, 15–3.

At the 2011 Canadian Championships in Nova Scotia, Castro matched his quarterfinal performance from the previous year, losing that time to Kris Odegard, 15–0, 15–9. He was also a quarterfinalist in doubles with Conrad Cole. They lost to Tim Landeryou and James Landeryou, 15–6, 15–13.

At the first National Team Selection Event of 2011–12, Castro lost to Francis Guillemette, 15–10, 15–11, in the Round of 16 in Oakville, Ontario.

== Career breakthrough – First National final (2012–2015) ==
At the 2012 Canadian Championships in Brossard, Québec, although Castro lost in a tie-breaker in the Round of 16 to Kris Odegard, 11–15, 15–8, 11–4, in Men's Singles, he had a breakthrough in Men's Doubles with Eric Desrochers by reaching the final. Seeded 5th, they beat 4th seeds Tim Landeryou and James Landeryou in the quarters, 15–9, 11–15, 11–5, and top seeds Mike Green and Kris Odegard, 15–11, 1–15, 11–9. But after winning two tie-breakers to reach the final, Castro and Desrochers couldn't win a third, as Vincent Gagnon and François Viens got the better of them, 15–8, 8–15, 11–9.

In November 2012, at the first National Team Selection Event of the 2012–13 season in Kelowna, British Columbia, Castro lost to Nathaniel Husulak, 15–4, 15–9, in the quarterfinals. But in the second National Team Selection Event in Brossard, Québec in February 2013, Castro had his best singles result, as he reached the semi-finals – beating Husulak in the quarters, 15–6, 15-11 before losing to Tim Landeryou, 15–7, 15–10. In the 3rd place match, Castro lost to Coby Iwaasa, 15–8, 15–10.

The 2013 Canadian Championships were in Langley, British Columbia, where Castro reached the quarterfinals with a win over Samuel Murray, 15–13, 15–9, in the Round of 16, before losing to Mike Green, 15–9, 15–4. In doubles, Castro and Eric Desrochers were the top seeded team based on being finalists in 2012. But they were upset in the semi-finals, but Lee Connell and Francis Guillemette, 15–10, 16–18, 13–11. They did win the 3rd place match over brothers Samuel and Tommy Murray, 15–4, 15–8.

At the second National Team Selection Event of 2013–14 in Brossard, Québec, Castro was a quarterfinalist, as he lost to Coby Iwaasa, 15–4, 15–5, in the quarters.

Castro represented Canada for the first time at the 2014 Pan American Championships in Santa Cruz de la Sierra, Bolivia, where he played Men's Doubles with Tim Landeryou. They lost in the quarterfinals to Bolivians Roland Keller and Ricardo Monroy, 15–13, 15–12.

Castro lost to Iwaasa again in the quarterfinals of Men's Singles at the 2014 Canadian Championships, but their match went to a tie-breaker with Iwaasa winning, 13–15, 17–15, 11–1. However, in doubles Castro played with Tim Landeryou for the first time, and they reached the finals, where they lost to Vincent Gagnon and Samuel Murray, 15–12, 15–2. It was Castro's 2nd time in the doubles final.

Castro's second appearance on Team Canada was at the 2014 Pan American Sports Festival, which was a test event for the 2015 Pan American Games in Guadalajara, Mexico. He played Men's Doubles with Tim Landeryou. They lost in the Round of 16 to Bolivians Conrrado Moscoso and Mario Mercado, 15–5, 15–11.

The first National Team Selection Event of 2014–15 was in Kitchener, Ontario, where Castro lost to Tim Landeryou, 15–6, 15–9, in the quarterfinals. Then in the second selection event was in Brossard, Quebec. Castro reached the final for the first time. He did so with wins over Samuel Murray, 15–13, 11–15, 12–10, in the quarterfinals, and Vincent Gagnon, 15–12, 15–13, in the semi-finals. In the final, Castro lost to Coby Iwaasa, 15–9, 6–15, 11–8.

Castro represented Canada in Men's Singles at the 2015 Pan American Championships in Santo Domingo, Dominican Republic. There he lost in the Round of 16 to top seed Álvaro Beltrán of Mexico, 15–5, 15–3.

Castro's Selection Event finals appearance didn't carry over to the 2015 Canadian Championships in Burnaby, British Columbia, where Castro was upset in the Round of 16 by James Landeryou, 16–14, 16–14. In doubles, Castro and Tim Landeryou lost in the semi-finals to Nicolas Bousquet and Tommy Murray, 10–15, 15–13, 12–10, but won the 3rd place match against Vincent Gagnon and Samuel Murray, 15–13, 15–12.

At the 1st National Team Selection Event of the 2015–16 season, Castro finished 4th in Brossard, Québec. He lost in the semi-finals to Mike Green, 13–15, 15–7, 11–5, and then lost the 3rd place match to Tim Landeryou, 15–10, 15–6, in the 3rd place match. At the 2nd Selection Event of the season in Grande Prairie, Alberta in early 2016, Castro was again 4th, as he lost in the semi-finals to Green again, 15–0, 15–12, and was beaten by Murray, 15–6, 15–1, in the 3rd place match.

== Career breakthrough – International medal & National championship (2016–2020) ==
For a third straight year, Castro went to the Pan American Championships. In 2016, he played Men's Doubles with Tim Landeryou in San Luis Potosí, Mexico, which was their 2nd partnership at the Pan Am Championships, as they were also doubles partners in 2014. The pair came home with bronze medals after losing in the semi-finals to Mexicans Alejandro Landa and Javier Moreno, 15–11, 14–15, 11–4. They got to the semis by defeating Costa Ricans Felipe Camacho and Teobaldo Fumero, 15–11, 13–15, 11–6. This was Castro's first medal for Canada.

He followed up that international medal by winning his first Canadian Championship, which came in Men's Doubles at the 2016 Canadian Championships in Burlington, Ontario. Castro and Samuel Murray beat Nicolas Bousquet and Tommy Murray, 15–8, 15–1, in the final. In the semi-finals, they defeated Tim Landeryou and Eric Desrochers, 15–12, 15–12. In Men's Singles that year, Castro was the 4th seed but was upset by veteran Corey Osborne in the Round of 16, 6–15, 15–4, 12–10.

At the National Team Selection Event in November 2016 in Valleyfield, Québec, Castro lost in the quarterfinals to James Landeryou, 15–6, 5–15, 11–3. Then in February 2017, Castro was 4th at the National Team Selection Event in Calgary. He lost in the semi-finals to Mike Green, 15–6, 15–8, and then dropped the 3rd place to Tim Landeryou due to an injury during the match.

Castro and Tim Landeryou teamed for Men's Doubles at the 2017 Pan American Championships in San José, Costa Rica, which was their 3rd appearance together and Castro's 4th overall. They lost in the quarterfinals to the Dominican Republic team of Ramon De Leon and Luis Perez, 15–6, 15–10.

In the 2017 Canadian Championships in Brossard, Québec, Castro and Landeryou faced off in the quarterfinals with Landeryou coming out on top, 7–15, 15–10, 11–2. In doubles, Castro and Samuel Murray were upset in the semi-finals by Mike Green and Trevor Webb, 15–6, 10–15, 11–8.

In the first National Team Selection Event of the 2017–18 season in November 2017 in Vernon, British Columbia, Castro lost in the quarterfinals to Coby Iwaasa, 18–16, 14–4, forfeit. In February 2018, Castro was 4th at the second Selection Event of the season in Kitchener, Ontario. He defeated Mike Green in the quarterfinals, 15–10, 15–12. But Castro forfeited both his semi-final match versus Tim Landeryou and the 3rd place match against Coby Iwaasa due to illness.

At the 2018 Canadian Championships, Castro finished 4th in Men's Singles, as he lost to Samuel Murray, 15–0, 15–13, in the semi-finals, and forfeited the 3rd place match to Tim Landeryou. In doubles, Castro partnered with Michael Leduc, and they lost to brothers Tim Landeryou and James Landderyou, 15–3, 17–15, in the quarterfinals.

In the first National Team Selection Event of the following season in November 2018 in Valleyfield, Québec, Castro was 4th, as he defeated Nicolas Bousquet, 17–15, 16–14, in the quarterfinals, but then forfeited both his semi-final match versus Samuel Murray and the 3rd place match against Tim Landeryou. At the second National Team Selection Event in February 2019 in Grande Prairie, Alberta, Castro came 3rd. He lost in the semi-finals to Samuel Murray, 15–6, 15–9, but won the 3rd place match versus Trevor Webb, 15–11, 15–1.

At the 2019 Canadian Championships, Castro lost in the quarterfinals to Trevor Webb, 15–13, 15–8. In doubles, Castro and Nicolas Bousquet finished 4th, as they lost in the semi-finals to Tim Landeryou and James Landeryou, 15–6, 14–16, 11–6, and then lost the 3rd place match versus Coby Iwaasa and Trevor Webb, 15–11, 15–9.

Castro didn't compete in either of the National Team Selection Events of the 2019–20 season, and announced his retirement from racquetball in August 2020.

== Career summary ==
Castro has represented Canada seven times, and made the podium once, earning a bronze medal in Men's Doubles with Tim Landeryou at the 2016 Pan American Racquetball Championships. He one Canadian Championship, which was also in Men's Doubles but with Samuel Murray in 2016.

=== Career record ===
This table lists Castro's results across annual events.

Event	2008	2009	2010	2011	2012	2013	2014	2015	2016	2017	2018	2019	2020
National Team Selection Event #1	11th*	-	-	-	-	QF	-	QF	SF	QF	QF	SF	-
National Team Selection Event #2	-	32	16	QF	16	SF	QF	F	SF	SF	SF	SF	-
Canadian National Doubles	-	16	16	QF	F	SF	F	SF	W	SF	QF	SF	CV
Canadian National Singles	32	16	QF	QF	16	QF	QF	16	16	QF	SF	QF	CV
Pan Am Championship	-	-	-	-	-	-	QF	16	SF	QF	QF	-	-

Note: W = winner, F = finalist, SF = semi-finalist, QF = quarterfinalist, 16 = Round of 16, 32 = Round of 32, CV = Cancelled due to COVID Pandemic. The years refer to the year the event occurred, except for National Team Selection Event #1, which occurs at the end of the previous year. That is, Selection Event #1 and #2 occur in different calendar years, as the racquetball season goes from September to May/June with the first Selection Event happening earlier in the season than the second.

== Baseball career ==
Castro is also an accomplished baseball player, and has competed in four seasons of the Ligue de baseball majeur du Québec. In 2017, his first of three seasons with Acton Vale, Castro won the league championship. He played with Montreal in the 2020 season. Castro played with Laurentides in the 2023 season. Castro's mother is Chilean, which makes him eligible for the Chile national baseball team. He hopes to play at the 2023 Pan American Games in Santiago, Chile.

== See also ==
- List of racquetball players
