= List of racquetball players =

This is a list of notable racquetball players.

Racquetball players are presumed to be notable under the following criteria.

1. The player has finished a season ranked in the top 10 of the men’s or women’s pro tours (i.e., the International Racquetball Tour or Ladies Professional Racquetball Tour).
2. The player has represented their country at an open level international event (e.g., the Racquetball World Championships, Pan American Racquetball Championships, Pan American Games, etc.)
3. The player is a member of the USA Racquetball Hall of Fame.

== Male ==
Name	Country	Top 10 Pro	International Player	USAR HOF
Andrés Acuña	Costa Rica	X	X	-
Jansen Allen	United States	X	X	-
Álvaro Beltrán	Mexico	X	X	-
Jake Bredenbeck	United States	X	X	-
Charlie Brumfield	United States	X	-	X
Rocky Carson	United States	X	X	-
Pedro Castro	Canada	-	X	-
Mike Ceresia	Canada	-	X	-
Ben Croft	United States	X	X	-
Chris Crowther	United States	X	X	-
Daniel De La Rosa	Mexico	X	X	-
Sebastian Franco	Colombia	X	X	-
Vincent Gagnon	Canada	-	X	-
Diego Garcia	Argentina	-	X	-
Juan Felipe Gomez	Colombia	-	X	-
Mike Green	Canada	X	X	-
Sherman Greenfeld	Canada	-	X	-
Andy Hawthorne	United States	X	X	-
Marty Hogan	United States	X	-	X
Jack Huczek	United States	X	X	X
Egan Inoue	United States	X	X	-
Coby Iwaasa	Canada	-	X	-
Steve Keeley	United States	X	-	-
Carlos Keller	Bolivia	-	X	-
Alejandro Landa	Mexico	X	X	-
Tim Landeryou	Canada	-	X	-
Adam Manilla	United States	X	X	-
Jason Mannino	United States	X	-	X
Javier Mar	Mexico	-	X	-
Mario Mercado	Colombia	X	X	-
Sudsy Monchik	United States	X	X	X
Rodrigo Montoya	Mexico	X	X	-
Conrrado Moscoso	Bolivia	X	X	-
Bud Muehleisen	United States	X	-	X
Samuel Murray	Canada	X	X	-
Kris Odegard	Canada	-	X	-
Corey Osborne	Canada	-	X	-
Andree Parrilla	Mexico	X	X	-
Eduardo Portillo	Mexico	X	X	-
Jose Rojas	United States	X	X	-
Cliff Swain	United States	X	X	X
José Daniel Ugalde	Ecuador	-	X	-
Shane Vanderson	United States	X	X	-
François Viens	Canada	-	X	-
Kane Waselenchuk	Canada	X	X	-

== Female ==
Name	Country	Top 10 Pro	International Player	USAR HOF
Susana Acosta	Mexico	X	X	-
Lynn Adams	United States	X	-	X
Cristina Amaya	Colombia	X	X	-
Angélica Barrios	Bolivia	X	X	-
Kristen Walsh Bellows	United States	X	X	-
Laura Fenton	United States	X	X	-
Michelle Gould	United States	X	X	X
Josée Grand'Maître	Canada	-	X	-
Angela Grisar	Chile	X	X	-
Cheryl Gudinas	United States	X	X	X
Alexandra Herrera	Mexico	X	X	-
Christie Huczek	Canada	X	X	X
Michelle Key	United States	X	X	-
Frédérique Lambert	Canada	X	X	-
Paola Longoria	Mexico	X	X	-
Erika Manilla	United States	X	X	-
Gabriela Martinez	Guatemala	-	X	-
Heather McKay	Australia	X	-	X
Montserrat Mejia	Mexico	X	X	-
Natalia Mendez	Argentina	X	X	-
Carla Muñoz	Chile	X	X	-
Jackie Paraiso	United States	X	X	X
Lori-Jane Powell	Canada	X	X	-
Rhonda Rajsich	United States	X	X	-
Naomi Ros	United States	-	X	-
Aimee Ruiz	United States	-	X	X
Samantha Salas	Mexico	X	X	-
Jennifer Saunders	Canada	X	X	-
Debbie Tisinger-Moore	United States	-	-	X
Janel Tisinger	United States	-	X	-
Maria Jose Vargas	Argentina	X	X	-
Kerri Wachtel	United States	X	-	-
