= Samuel Murray (racquetball) =

Canadian racquetball player (born 1993)

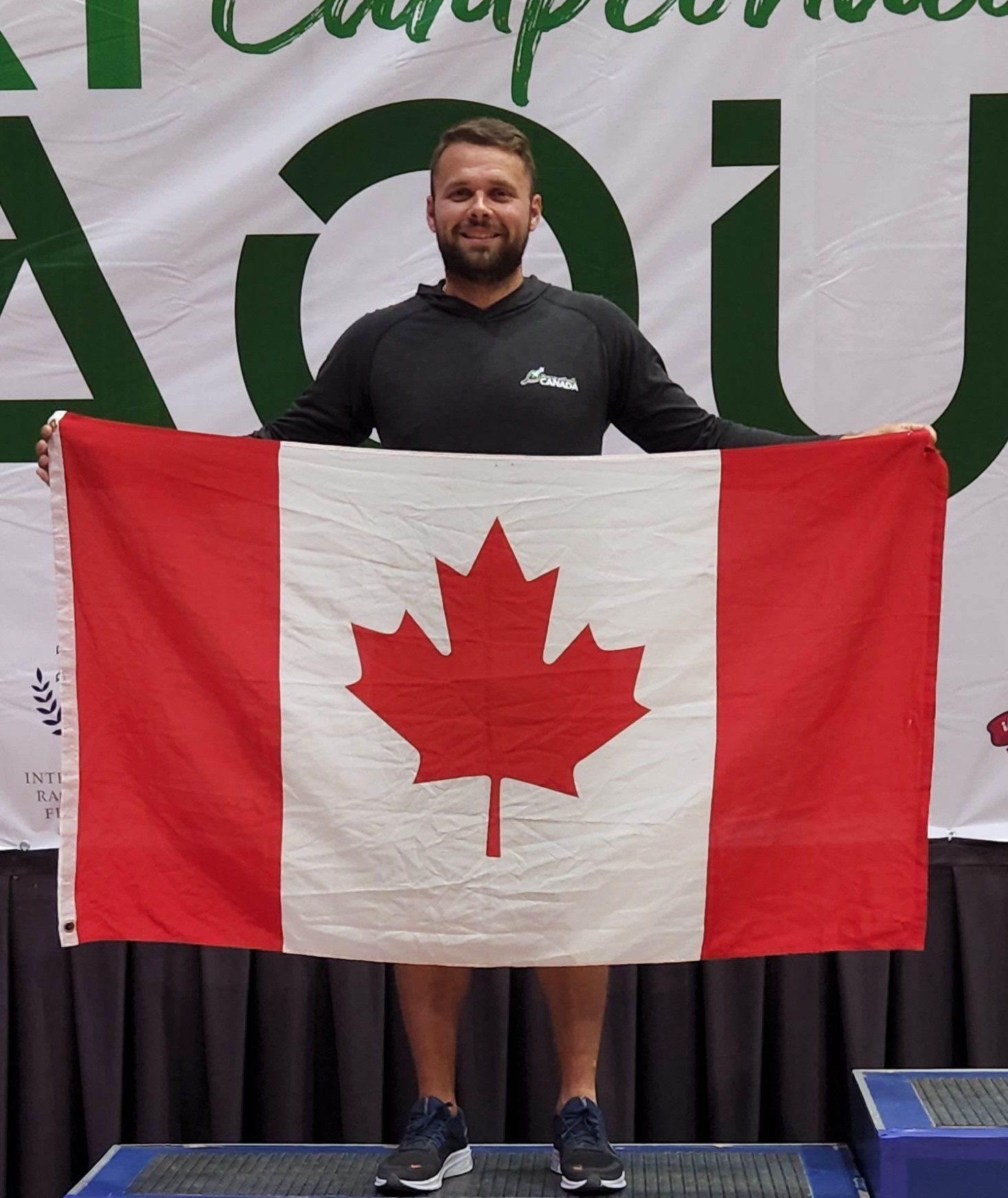
- Samuel Murray on the podium at the 2022 IRF World Championships

Personal information
- Nationality: Canadian
- Born: June 4, 1993 (age 33) Baie-Comeau, Quebec

Sport
- Sport: Racquetball
- Coached by: Rino Langelier

Achievements and titles
- World finals: Doubles Champion: 2024
- National finals: Singles Champion: 2018, 2019, 2021, 2022, 2023, 2024, 2026: Doubles Champion: 2014, 2016, 2018, 2019, 2021, 2022, 2026
- Highest world ranking: 3rd
Medal record
Men's Racquetball
Representing Canada
World Championships
| Gold medal – first place | 2024 San Antonio | Doubles |
| Silver medal – second place | 2024 San Antonio | Team |
| Silver medal – second place | 2022 San Luis Potosí | Team |
| Silver medal – second place | 2022 San Luis Potosí | Mixed |
| Bronze medal – third place | 2022 San Luis Potosí | Doubles |
| Bronze medal – third place | 2018 San José | Doubles |
| Bronze medal – third place | 2016 Cali | Singles |
Pan American Games
| Silver medal – second place | 2023 Santiago | Team |
| Silver medal – second place | 2023 Santiago | Doubles |
Pan Am Championships
| Bronze medal – third place | 2026 Guatemala City | Singles |
| Silver medal – second place | 2026 Guatemala City | Doubles |
| Bronze medal – third place | 2025 Guatemala City | Singles |
| Silver medal – second place | 2024 Guatemala City | Singles |
| Silver medal – second place | 2024 Guatemala City | Doubles |
| Bronze medal – third place | 2024 Guatemala City | Men's Team |
| Gold medal – first place | 2022 Santa Cruz | Doubles |
| Silver medal – second place | 2019 Barranquilla | Doubles |
| Bronze medal – third place | 2018 Temuco | Doubles |

Samuel Murray (born June 4, 1993) is a Canadian racquetball player. He is the current International Racquetball Federation (IRF) World Champion in Men's Doubles, winning the title with Coby Iwaasa in 2024. Previously, Murray was the 2022 Pan American Champion in Men's Doubles (with Iwaasa). He has won twice on the International Racquetball Tour, and is only the second Canadian to win on the IRT (after Kane Waselenchuk), and been ranked as high as #3. He is the current Canadian Champion in Men's Singles, winning the title for a seventh time in 2026.

== Junior years ==
Murray competed at the Canadian Junior National Championships on several occasions, winning six championships: three in singles and three in doubles. In Boys' Singles, he won U12 in 2006, U14 in 2008, and U16 in 2010. In Boys' Doubles, he won U14 with Pedro Castro in 2006, and they won U16 in 2008. In 2012, Murray and Sebastian Juteau won Boys' U18 Doubles.

== 2012–2015 – Career begins ==
Murray played in the 2nd Racquetball Canada National Team Selection Event of the 2010–11 season, as it was in Brossard, Québec – his home province. Seeded 16th, he lost to 17th seed Nathaniel Husulak in the Round of 32, 7–15, 15–8, 11–6.

Murray played Men's Doubles with Jean-Philippe Morin in the 2012 Canadian Championships, and they lost in the Round of 16 to Francis Guillemette and Corey Osborne, 15–6, 15–6. In Men's Singles, Murray lost to Hugo Laprise due to an injury.

Murray played in the 2nd Racquetball Canada National Team Selection Event of the 2012–13 season in February 2013 in Brossard, Québec, where he reached the quarterfinals and lost to Coby Iwaasa, 15–13, 16–14.

Murray played Men's Doubles with his older brother Tommy in the 2013 Canadian Championships in Langley, British Columbia, where they finished 4th. After winning the quarterfinals against another brother team of James Landeryou and Tim Landeryou, 15–7, 15–6, they lost in the semi-finals to Mike Green and Coby Iwaasa, 15–3, 15–6. They then lost the 3rd place match to Pedro Castro and Eric Desrochers, 15–4, 15–8. In Men's Singles that year, Murray lost to Castro in the Round of 16, 15–13, 15–9.

In November 2013, Murray finished 4th at the 1st National Team Selection Event of the 2013–14 season in Winnipeg, where he reached the semi-finals by defeating Tim Landeryou in the quarterfinals, 9–15, 15–12, 11–9, but lost to Vincent Gagnon, 7–15, 15–11, 11–5. In the 3rd place match, he lost to Coby Iwaasa, 15–10, 15–8. In the 2nd National Team Selection Event of that season, he also played Landeryou in the quarters, but lost, 15–10, 15–7, in Brossard, Québec in January 2014.

The 2014 Canadian National Championships were also in Brossard, and Murray became a Canadian Champion for the first time, as he won Men's Doubles with Vincent Gagnon. They defeated Pedro Castro and Tim Landeryou in the final, 15–12, 15–2. In the semis, they beat Francis Guillemette and Corey Osborne, 15–8, 15–10. Murray also had his best showing in Men's Singles, as he finished 4th in Men's Singles. He lost in the semi-finals to Tim Landeryou, 15–12, 15–12, and then lost the 3rd place match to Coby Iwaasa, 13–15, 15–6, 11–8.

Murray qualified to play on Team Canada for the first time for the 2014 World Championships, which were in June 2014 in Burlington, Ontario, where he played Men's Singles. He lost in the Round of 32 to Guatemalan Edwin Galicia, 15–12, 15–12. That summer Murray played for Canada at the 2014 Pan American Sports Festival in Guadalajara, Mexico, where he lost in the Round of 16 to team-mate Coby Iwaasa, 15–9, 10–15, 11–3.

In November 2014, Murray was a quarterfinalist at the 1st National Team Selection Event of the 2014–15 season in Kitchener, Ontario, where he lost to Coby Iwaasa, 15–9, 15–10. He was also a quarterfinalist at the 2nd Selection Event that season in Brossard, Québec, where he lost to Pedro Castro, 15–13, 11–15, 12–10.

Murray played at the Pan American Championships for the first time in March 2015 in Santo Domingo, Dominican Republic. He lost in the Round of 16 to Daniel de la Rosa of Mexico, 15–14, 15–9. It was his 3rd Team Canada appearance.

Murray reached the finals of Men's Singles at the Canadian Championships for the 1st time in 2015 in Burnaby, British Columbia, where he lost to Coby Iwaasa, 15–10, 12–15, 11–7. Murray defeated Vincent Gagnon in the semi-finals, 15–10, 15–10. Murray and Gagnon played doubles together, but they lost in the semi-finals to Iwaasa and Mike Green, 15–9, 9–15, 11–4.

== 2015–2020 – Career breakthrough ==
The 2015–16 season saw Murray break through to win his first National Team Selection Event in November 2015, in Brossard, Québec, where he beat Mike Green in the final, 15–10, 15–13. He defeated Tim Landeryou to reach the final, 15–7, 15–12. In the 2nd Selection Event that season, he lost a tie-breaker to Landeryou in the semi-finals, 10–15, 15–12, 11–9. But he did win the 3rd place match against Pedro Castro, 15–6, 15–1.

Murray played at the 2016 Pan American Championships in San Luis Potosí, Mexico. He reached the quarterfinals with a win over Alexander Pirie of Costa Rica, 15–0, 15–8, but lost in the quarters to the USA's Jake Bredenbeck, 15–1, 13–15, 11–8. It was his 4th Team Canada appearance.

At the 2016 Canadian Championships, Murray was seeded 3rd in Men's Singles, but was upset in the Round of 16 by Eric Desrochers, 15–12, 4–15, 11–8. However, he did win Men's Doubles with Pedro Castro. They defeated Nicolas Bousquet and Tommy Murray, 15–8, 15–1, in the final, as well as beating Desrochers and Tim Landeryou in the semi-finals, 15–12, 15–12. Their win was Murray's 2nd Canadian Championship.

Murray played Men's Singles at the 2016 World Championships in Cali, Colombia, and came away with a bronze medal. He defeated the USA's Chris Crowther in the quarterfinals, 7–15, 15–3, 11–7, and then lost to Mexican Daniel de la Rosa, 15–12, 15–7.

Murray won the 1st National Team Selection event of the 2016–17 season in Valleyfield, Québec, where he defeated James Landeryou, 15–4, 15–4, in the final. In the semi-finals, Murray beat Landeryou's older brother Tim, 15–9, 15–13. At the 2nd selection event that season in Calgary, Murray defeated Tim Landeryou to reach the final, but lost to Mike Green, 15–12, 15–11.

Murray began to play on the International Racquetball Tour full time in the 2016–17 season. He played in eight tournaments that season. Murray's best finish was a semi-final in Dayton, Ohio, where he beat Sebastian Franco in the Round of 16, 9–11, 11–5, 11–4, 10–12, 11–6, and Jose Rojas in the quarterfinals, 11–4, 11–6, 3–11, 11–4, before losing in the semis to Rocky Carson, 10–12, 11–0. 11–9, 14–12. Overall, Murray finished 14th in the rankings that season.

Murray was runner up in Men's Singles at the 2017 Canadian Championships, losing to Mike Green in a tie-breaker, 12–15, 15–12, 12–10. In Men's Doubles that year, Murray and Pedro Castro came 3rd, as they lost to Green and Trevor Webb in the semi-finals, 15–13, 4–15, 11–5, but beat Lee Connell and Nathaniel Husulak, 15–9, 16–14.

Murray won the 1st National Team Selection event of the 2017–18 season, as he defeated Tim Landeryou, 15–3, 15–8, in the final. In the semi-finals, Murray beat Coby Iwaasa, 15–11, 15–8. Murray and Landeryou also met in the final of the 2nd National Team Selection Event that season with the same result: a win for Murray, 15–13, 15–3. Murray also beat Iwaasa in the semi-finals, 15–2, 15–5.

At the 2018 Pan American Championships in Temuco, Chile, Murray played Men's Doubles with Nicolas Bousquet. They defeated Thomas Carter and David Horn of the US in the quarterfinals, 15–10, 15–4, and then lost to Álvaro Beltrán and Rodrigo Montoya, 15–3, 15–13. So, Murray and Bousquet came home with bronze medals.

Murray won Men's Singles at the Canadian Championships for the first time in 2018 in Winnipeg, where he defeated Iwaasa in the final, 15–7, 10–15, 11–2. He reached the final by defeating Pedro Castro in the semi-finals, 15–0, 15–2. Murray and Iwaasa played together in Men's Doubles, and captured the title by defeating Nicolas Bousquet and Tommy Murray in the final, 15–13, 10–15, 11–6. They beat the brother team of James Landeryou and Tim Landeryou in the semi-finals, 15–13, 15–10.

Once again, Murray was selected to represent Canada at Worlds in San José, Costa Rica. He played both Men's Singles and Men's doubles with Tim Landeryou. In singles, he defeated Jose Daniel Ugalde of Ecuador, 15–10, 15–3, in the Round of 16, but lost to the USA's Charlie Pratt in the quarterfinals, 15–2, 15–12. But in doubles, Murray and Landeryou reached the podium. They beat Argentines Fernando Kurzbard and Shai Manzuri, 15–1, 15–7, in the quarterfinals, but lost Rocky Carson and Sudsy Monchik of the US in the semi-finals, 15–12, 15–2.

In the 2018–19 season, Murray won the 1st National Team Selection Event in Valleyfield, Québec, where he beat Coby Iwaasa, 9–15, 15–6, 11–6. He also defeated Iwaasa in the 2nd National Team Selection Event in Grande Prairie, Alberta, 15–10, 15–10. He defeated Pedro Castro in the semi-finals, 15–6, 15–9.

Murray began the 2018–19 IRT season strongly, as he made his first final at the first event of the season – the 2018 MWRA Season Opener IRT Pro/Am in Laurel, Maryland, where he beat Alejandro Landa in the semi-finals, 15–8, 9–15, 11–7, but then lost to Rocky Carson in the final, 15–7, 15–12. Also in that season, Murray was a quarterfinalist four times and finished 2018–19 ranked 7th: a career high.

The second Racquetball Canada National Team Selection event of 2018–19 was in Grande Prairie, Alberta, where Murray finished on top by defeating Coby Iwaasa, 15–10, 15–10, in the final. He beat Pedro Castro in the semi-finals, 15–6, 15–9.

Murray was a member of Team Canada for the 2019 Pan American Racquetball Championships in Barranquilla, Colombia, where he reached an international final for the first time. Murray and Coby Iwaasa were finalists in Men's Doubles. They beat Costa Ricans Andres Acuña and Felipe Camacho in the semi-finals, 8–15, 15–1, 11–3, but lost to Bolivians Roland Keller and Conrrado Moscoso, 2–15, 15–9, 11–2, in the final.

Murray successfully defended his Men's Singles title at the Canadian Championships, winning Men's Open for a second time in 2019 in Langley, British Columbia, where he defeated Iwaasa in the final, 15–3, 15–6. He beat Trevor Webb in the semi-finals, 15–3, 15–2. Murray also captured the Men's Doubles title, and he did so with his brother Tommy Murray. They beat another brother team in the final – James Landeryou and Tim Landeryou – 17–15, 10–15, 11–1.

For the first time in his career, Murray played in the Pan American Games. He competed in Lima, Peru, where he played in Men's Singles, Men's Doubles, and the Men's Team event. Murray was a quarterfinalist in all three. In Men's singles, as he lost to eventual gold medalist Rodrigo Montoya of Mexico, 15–7, 15–10. He played Men's doubles with Coby Iwaasa, and as in singles, Murray and Iwaasa were quarterfinalists, losing to Mexicans Montoya and Javier Mar, 15–5, 15–6. Murray and Iwaasa were also quarterfinalists in the Men's Team event, as they lost to Colombia, who went on to take silver.

In the 2019–20 season, Murray won both National Team Selection Events. The first was held in Sherwood Park, Alberta, where he defeated Coby Iwaasa in the final, 15–5, 15–8. He also beat Iwaasa in the final of the second event in Winnipeg, although that match went to a tie-breaker with Murray coming out on top, 8–15, 15–7, 11–1.

== 2021–present – Winning on tour and on Team Canada ==
Murray won the first IRT event of the 2020–21 season, the Suivant Consulting Pro-Am in Lilburn, Georgia in January 2021, when he defeated Conrrado Moscoso, 15–7, 8–15, 11–9, to become just the 2nd Canadian (after Kane Waselenchuk) to win a Tier 1 or Grand Slam IRT event. En route to the title, Murray beat Javier Mar in the Round of 16, Daniel de la Rosa in the quarterfinals, and Alejandro Landa in the semi-finals.

Murray was on Team Canada for the 2021 IRF World Championships in Guatemala City, Guatemala, where he played Men's Doubles with Coby Iwaasa. They lost to Bolivians Roland Keller and Conrrado Moscoso, 9–15, 15–12, 11–4, in the quarterfinals, although they had beaten Bolivia in the group stage of matches.

Murray and Coby Iwaasa won Men's Doubles at the 2022 Pan American Racquetball Championships in Santa Cruz de la Sierra, Bolivia, where they defeated Ecuadorans Juan Francisco Cueva and Jose Daniel Ugalde in the final, 10–15, 15–13, 15–5, 11–15, 11–5. Murray also played Men's Singles in Bolivia, losing in the quarterfinals to American Alejandro Landa, 15–12, 9–15, 15–12, 15–10.

He won his 4th Canadian Men's Singles Championship and 6th Canadian Men's Doubles Championship in Brossard, Québec in May, 2022. Murray beat Coby Iwaasa in the Men's Singles final, 15–9, 15–8, 15–8, and Lee Connell in the semi-finals, 15–12, 15–5, 15–5. Murray played doubles with his brother Tommy, and they defeated Iwaasa and Kurtis Cullen in the final, 12–15, 15–14, 15–6, 15–9. Murray's 10 Canadian titles tie him for sixth most all time with Mike Ceresia and Sherman Greenfeld.

Murray was part of three medals for Canada at the 2022 IRF World Championships in San Luis Potosí, Mexico. He and Coby Iwaasa were bronze medalists in Men's Doubles, Murray and Frédérique Lambert were silver medalists in Mixed Doubles, and he was part of the Men's Team that were runners up to Mexico. Murray helped Canada finish 4th overall as a team.

Murray played singles and doubles (with Coby Iwaasa) at the 2023 Pan American Racquetball Championships in Guatemala City, Guatemala, but was injured in the last doubles match of the group stage, so he had to withdraw from the tournament.

He won his 5th Canadian Men's Singles Championship at the 2023 Racquetball Canada National Championships in Winnipeg, Manitoba, where he beat Coby Iwaasa in the Men's Singles final, 11–4, 12–10, 11–3, and Kurtis Cullen in the semi-finals, 11-5, 11–4, 11–6. Murray played doubles with his brother Tommy, and they were the three time defending champions, but lost to Iwaasa and Cullen in the final, 12–10, 11–9, 11–4. Murray's 11 Canadian titles tie him for fifth most all time with Wayne Bowes.

Murray was part of Team Canada at the 2023 Pan American Games in Santiago, Chile. He played singles, doubles, mixed doubles and the men's team event. Murray earned two silver medals in Santiago. In Men's Doubles, he and Coby Iwaasa defeated the Independent Athletes team of Edwin Galicia and Juan José Salvatierra, 11-9, 8-11, 11-7, 8-11, 11-7, in the semi-finals, and then in the final lost to Mexicans Javier Mar and Rodrigo Montoya, 6-11, 11-7, 12-10, 12-10. Murray and Iwaasa were also in the Men's Team final, losing to Bolivia 2-0, with Murray losing to Conrrado Moscoso in three games, 11-5, 11-9, 11-2.

Murray won his 2nd IRT event in January 2024, when he took the 44th Annual Lewis Drug Pro-Am in Sioux Falls, South Dakota. He defeated Rodrigo Montoya, 15-12, 9-15, 11-10, in the final, after beating Conrrado Moscoso in the semi-finals, 13-15, 15-14, 11-2.

Playing at the 2024 Pan American Racquetball Championships in Guatemala City, Murray won three medals. He was runner up in Men's Singles to Mexican Rodrigo Montoya, and with Coby Iwaasa in Men's Doubles to Costa Ricans Andrés Acuña and Gabriel Garcia. Murray got a bronze medal in the Men's Team event, as he helped Canada beat Guatemala in the quarterfinals, but they lost to Mexico in the semi-finals.

Murray and Coby Iwaasa became the first Canadian men to win Men's Doubles at the IRF World Championships, as they captured gold at the 2024 World Championships in San Antonio, Texas. They defeated Bolivians Kadim Carrasco and Conrrado Moscoso in the semi-finals, 5-11, 12-10, 11-7, 8-11, 11-8, and then Mexicans Andree Parrilla and Eduardo Portillo in the final, 11-5, 6-11, 11-8, 4-11, 11-6. Murray also helped Canada finish 2nd in the Men's Team event at Worlds, losing to the USA in the final, 2-1.

Murray and Coby Iwaasa won silver in Men's Doubles at the 2026 Pan American Racquetball Championships in Guatemala City, where they lost to Mexicans Javier Mar and Rodrigo Montoya in the final, 7-11, 11-8, 11-7, 14-16, 11-6, after defeating Ecuadorans Juan Francisco Cueva and Jose Daniel Ugalde in the semi-finals, 11-9, 9-11, 11-2, 11-5. Murray also medalled in singles in Guatemala, where he defeated Costa Rican Andrés Acuña in the quarterfinals, 9-11, 11-4, 11-5, 11-5, but lost in the semi-finals to Mexican Eduardo Portillo, 11-1, 11-7, 7-11, 7-11, 11-4.

== Career summary ==
Murray's career is highlighted by his IRF World Championship, Pan American Championship (both in Men's Doubles with Coby Iwaasa), and his two wins on the International Racquetball Tour (IRT). He's also been Canadian Champion 14 times: 7 in singles and 7 times in doubles with four different partners: Vincent Gagnon, Pedro Castro, Iwaasa and his brother Tommy.

=== Career record ===
This table lists Murray's results across annual events.

| Event | 2011 | 2012 | 2013 | 2014 | 2015 | 2016 | 2017 | 2018 | 2019 | 2020 | 2021 | 2022 | 2023 | 2024 | 2025 | 2026 |
| National Team Selection Event #1 | | | | 3rd | QF | W | W | W | W | W | CV | * | F | W | W | W |
| National Team Selection Event #2 | 32 | | QF | QF | QF | SF | F | W | W | W | CV | W | W | W | W | W |
| Canadian National Singles | - | 32 | 16 | 4th | F | 16 | F | W | W | CV | W | W | W | W | F | W |
| Canadian National Doubles | | 16 | 4th | W | SF | W | 3rd | W | W | CV | W | W | F | F | F | W |
| US Open | 256 | | 64 | 32 | | 32 | 32 | 16 | 32 | CV | QF | QF | - | - | | |
| IRT Ranking | | | | | | | 14 | 8 | 7 | 7 | 3 | 6 | 10 | 18 | 40 | |

Note: W = winner, F = finalist, SF = semi-finalist, QF = quarterfinalist, 16 = Round of 16. The years refer to the year the event occurred or the season in which they occurred. For example, Murray won both Selection Event #1 and #2 in the 2019–20 season, although those events happened in different calendar years. "CV" indicates the event was not held during the COVID-19 pandemic.

== Personal ==
Murray lives in Montreal, Quebec. His older brother Tommy also plays racquetball, and was a Canadian Junior Champion. The brothers have won four Canadian National Doubles titles together.

== See also ==
- List of racquetball players
