= Tim Landeryou =

Canadian racquetball player (born 1984)

Personal information
- Nationality: Canadian
- Born: March 16, 1984 (age 42) Wallaceburg, Ontario
- Height: 174 cm (5 ft 9 in)
- Weight: 72 kg (159 lb)

Sport
- Sport: Racquetball
- Coached by: Loren Prentice
- Retired: 2020
Medal record
Men's Racquetball
Representing Canada
World Championships
Bronze medal – third place	2018 San José	Doubles
Silver medal – second place	2012 Santo Domingo	Men's Team
Silver medal – second place	2010 Seoul	Doubles
Silver medal – second place	2010 Seoul	Men's Team
Pan American Games
Bronze medal – third place	2015 Toronto	Men's doubles
Bronze medal – third place	2015 Toronto	Men's team
Bronze medal – third place	2011 Guadalajara	Men's doubles
Pan Am Championships
Bronze medal – third place	2016 San Luis Potosi	Doubles
Gold medal – first place	2010 San Pedro Sula	Doubles

Tim Landeryou (born March 16, 1984) is a Canadian retired racquetball player. He was a member of the Canadian National Team from 2010 to 2020, winning multiple medals in international competitions.

== Junior years ==
Landeryou won the Boy's U14 Doubles title at the 1999 Canadian Junior Championships with brother James Landeryou. He also won Boy's U18 Singles twice: in 2001 and 2002. His final junior Canadian title was again in doubles with brother James in 2003, when the won Boy's U18. Overall, Landeryou won four Canadian Junior Championships: two singles and two doubles.

At the 2003 International Racquetball Federation (IRF) World Junior Championships, Landeryou and Eric Desrochers finished 3rd in Boy's U18 Doubles.

Landeryou lost to Corey Osborne in the Round of 16 at the 2003 Nationals in Vancouver.

== Career begins (2004-2009) ==
Landeryou had some success while making the transition from playing juniors to playing adults, but it was awhile before he reached the podium at national level events. Landeryou played in a Racquetball Canada National Team Selection Event for the first time in February 2004 in Victoria, British Columbia, where he defeated Eric Desrochers, 10–15, 15–11, 11–6, in the Round of 16, and then lost to Mike Green, 15–7, 15–8, in the quarterfinals.

Landeryou and Desrochers played doubles at the 2004 Nationals in Burlington, Ontario, and upset 4th seeds Vincent Gagnon and Francis Guillemette, 15–14, 15–2, in the quarterfinals before losing to eventual champions Mike Green and Tom O’Brien, 15–10, 15–9, in the semi-finals.

In the 2005 National Team Selection Event in Brossard, Quebec, Landeryou again lost to Mike Green, 15–13, 15–6, in the quarterfinals, and finished 5th with a win over Francis Guillemette, 15–12, 3-15, 11–7.

Landeryou played in the 2005 Canadian Championships in Regina, Saskatchewan, where he finished 7th in singles, and 6th in doubles partnering with Hugo Laprise.

The 2006 National Team Selection Event was in Burnaby, British Columbia, where Landeryou was upset in the Round of 32 by Michael Burgess, 11–15, 17–15, 11–6, although he did win the consolation side to finish 17th.

In the 2007 National Team Selection Event in Brossard, Québec, Landeryou lost in the quarterfinals to Kris Odegard, 6-15, 15–5, 11–5. He ended up finishing 5th.

At the 2007 Canadian Championships, Landeryou lost in the quarterfinals of singles to Vincent Gagnon. He played doubles with his brother James, and they finished 3rd. They lost in semi-finals to Mike Green and Brian Istace, but won the 3rd place match versus Francis Guillemette and Kris Odegard.

At the National Team Doubles Selection Event in January 2008, Landeryou came 4th with brother James Landeryou. They beat Lee Connell and Eric Desrochers, 15–11, 15–12, to qualify for the last four playoff round, but failed to win another match. Then in the National Team Singles Selection Event in Winnipeg, Landeryou lost in the Round of 16 to Eric Desrochers, 15–10, 15–12.

Landeryou lost in the quarterfinals of singles at the 2008 Canadian Championships to Mike Green, 15–8, 15–8. In doubles, he and brother James finished 3rd. They lost in semi-finals to Green and Brian Istace, 15–7, 15–6, but won 3rd place against Francis Guillemette and Kris Odegard, 8-15, 15–12, 13–11.

Landeryou lost to Francis Guillemette, 16–14, 3-15, 12–10, in the Round of 16 at the 2009 National Team Selection Event in Brossard, Québec.

Edmonton hosted the 2009 Canadian Championships, and there Landeryou lost in quarterfinals of singles to eventual 2009 champion Kris Odegard, 13–15, 15–12, 14–12, and came 3rd in doubles with James Landeryou, as they lost in semi-finals to eventual champions Vincent Gagnon and François Viens, 15–11, 15–5, but won 3rd place in a walkover of Odegard and Ryan Smith.

In November 2009 in Regina, Saskatchewan, Landeryou lost to Lee Connell, 15–7, 15–2, in the quarterfinals of the first National Team Selection Event of the season. But he got revenge on Connell by beating him 15–8, 15–9 at the second selection event in January 2010 in Brossard, Québec, which helped Landeryou finish 4th.

== Career breakthrough - Making the Canadian team (2010-2018) ==
Landeryou's first international appearance with Team Canada was at the 2010 Pan Am Championships, where he won Men's Doubles with Mike Green, as they defeated Mexicans Ruben Estrada and Alejandro Landa in the final, 15–9, 12–15, 11–9.

Landeryou had a breakthrough at the 2010 Nationals, as he reached the final in singles for the first time by upsetting top seed and defending champion Kris Odegard, 12–15, 15–5, 11–6, in the semi-finals. He faced then 5-time champion Mike Green in the final, and Lost in a tie-breaker, 15–11, 9-15, 11–4. In doubles, Landeryou came 4th w/ James, losing in the semi-finals to eventual champions Green and Odegard, 15–7, 15–8, and then dropping the 3rd place match against Francis Guillemette and Corey Osborne, 15–11, 15–5.

Landeryou was on Team Canada at the 2010 World Championships in Seoul, South Korea, where he again played Men's Doubles with Green. They reached the final for a second consecutive competition, but unfortunately this time they lost in the final to Americans Ben Croft and Mitch Williams, 15–2, 15–13. Nonetheless, it was two medals in two competitions for Landeryou, and he also helped Canada to a silver medal finish in the Men's Team event.

At the first National Team Selection Event of 2010–11, Landeryou lost in the semi-finals to Vincent Gagnon, 8-15, 15–13, 11–3, and then won the 3rd place match against Conrad Cole, 15–10, 15–6. Landeryou repeated those results at the second selection that season in Brossard, Québec, where he lost in the semi-finals to Gagnon, 15–9, 15–9, and then won the third place match against Kris Odegard, 8-15, 15–12, 13–11.

Landeryou played Men's Singles at the 2011 Pan American Racquetball Championships, and finished 11th, missing the podium for the first time internationally.

At the 2011 Canadian Championships in Nova Scotia, Landeryou was 4th in both singles, and doubles. In singles, he lost to Mike Green in the semi-finals, 10–15, 15–1, 11–2, and then dropped the 3rd place match to Kris Odegard, 15–8, 15–4. In doubles, he and brother James lost to Green and Odegard in the semi-finals, 15–12, 15–13, and also lost the 3rd place match to Vincent Gagnon and François Viens, 15–5, 15–3.

Landeryou was back on the podium in his third Team Canada appearance, when he was selected to compete at the 2011 Pan American Games in Men's Doubles with Kris Odegard. They reached the semi-finals, but then lost to Venezuelans Cesar Castro and Jorge Hirsekorn, 15–14, 3-15, 11–10, thereby earning bronze medals for Canada.

In the 2011-12 National Team Selection Events, Landeryou finished 4th in Oakville, Ontario, where he lost in the semi-finals to Mike Green, 15–7, 15–3, and then lost in the 3rd place match to Kris Odegard, 15–4, 15–6. He was 3rd at the second selection event, as he lost to Odegard in the semi-finals in Regina, 15–11, 15–7, and won the 3rd place match, beating Nathaniel Husulak, 15–8, 15–9.

At the 2012 Pan American Racquetball Championships, Landeryou played doubles with Nathaniel Husulak, losing in the quarter finals to Mexicans Alejandro Cardona and Edson Martinez.

At the 2012 Canadian Championships in Brossard, Québec, Landeryou finished 3rd in singles. He lost to Mike Green in the semi-finals, 15–8, 15–2, but got a default win over Kris Odegard for 3rd place. He played with James Landeryou in doubles, and the brothers lost in the quarterfinals to Pedro Castro and Eric Desrochers, 15–9, 11–15, 11–5.

At the 2012 World Championships in Santo Domingo, Dominican Republic, Landeryou lost in the Round of 16 to Carlos Keller of Bolivia. But he was part of the Canadian men's team that earned the silver medal in the team competition, although Landeryou didn't play in that part of the competition.

The 2012–13 season was arguably Landeryou's best, as he won both National Team Selection Events. In November 2012 in Kelowna, British Columbia, Landeryou beat Eric Desrochers, 15–13, 11–15, 11–7, in the final. He got to the final with wins over Nathaniel Husulak in the semi-finals, 9-15, 15–9, 11–5, and over Coby Iwaasa, 7-15, 16–14, 11–4, in the quarterfinals. The win was Landeryou's first selection event title.

He followed up the win with a second at the National Team Selection Event in Brossard, Québec in February 2013 by defeating nemesis Mike Green in the final, 16–14, 8-15, 11–8. Landeryou reached the final with wins over Pedro Castro in the semi-finals, 15–7, 15–10, and Lee Connell in the quarterfinals, 15–5, 15–8.

With those wins, Landeryou looked good going into the 2013 Canadian Championships. He did reach the Men's Singles final for just the second time, but as in the first time Mike Green defeated Landeryou in the final, 15–10, 15–8. Landeryou got to the final by defeating Nathaniel Husulak in the semi-finals, 15–10, 15–8. In doubles, Landeryou and his brother James lost in the quarterfinals to another brother team in Samuel and Tommy Murray, 15–7, 15–6.

Landeryou qualified for the 2013 World Games in Cali, Colombia based on his performance at the 2012 World Championships. In Cali, Landeryou played Men's Singles, and he lost to Colombian Alejandro Herrera in the Round of 16.

At the first National Team Selection Event of 2013–14 in Winnipeg, Landeryou lost in the quarterfinals to Samuel Murray, 9-15, 15–12, 11–9. In the second selection event, Landeryou finished 3rd. He lost to Vincent Gagnon, 15–13, 13–15, 11–9, but beat Coby Iwaasa in the 3rd place match, 15–7, 14–15, 11–6.

Landeryou reached the final in Men's Singles at the 2014 Canadian Championships with a win over Samuel Murray, 15–12, 15–12. It was his 3rd final and second in a row, but for the first time, Landeryou faced Vincent Gagnon, not Mike Green, who he'd lost to in his two previous finals. Unfortunately for Landeryou, the outcome was the same, as Gagnon defeated Landeryou for the title, 15–5, 13–15, 11–5. In doubles, Landeryou played with a different partner for the first time in eight years, as he partnered with Pedro Castro. It was a successful partnership, as Castro helped Landeryou reach the doubles final for the first time ever. However, they were stimied in the final by Gagnon and Murray, losing 15–12, 15–2.

Landeryou played Men's Singles at the 2014 World Championships in Burlington, Ontario. He lost in the quarterfinals to Bolivia's Carlos Keller, 15–6, 15–12.

The first National Team Selection Event of 2014-15 was in Kitchener, Ontario, where Landeryou finished 4th. He lost to Vincent Gagnon, 15–7, 15–10, in the semi-finals, and then to Coby Iwaasa, 15–11, 15–9, in the 3rd place match. In the second selection event, Landeryou was also 4th. He lost to Iwaasa in the semi-finals, 12–15, 15–4, 11–7, and then to Gagnon in the 3rd place match, 15–12, 15–13.

In Burnaby, British Columbia, Landeryou lost in the quarterfinals of singles at the 2015 Canadian Championships to Coby Iwaasa, 15–8, 15–0. In doubles, Landeryou and Pedro Castro lost in the semi-finals to Nicolas Bousquet and Tommy Murray, 10–15, 15–13, 12–10, but won the 3rd place match against Vincent Gagnon and Samuel Murray, 15–13, 15–12.

Landeryou played in the second Pan American Games of his career in 2015 in Toronto, where he teamed up with Vincent Gagnon for Men's Doubles. They defeated Argentina's Daniel Maggi and Shai Mazuri in the quarterfinals, but lost to Bolivians Roland Keller and Conrado Moscoso, 15–9, 15–11, in the semi-finals, resulting in bronze medals for them. He captured a second bronze medal in Toronto, as Canada reached the semi-finals of the Men's Team event, losing to the USA.

At the 1st National Team Selection Event of the 2015–16 season, Landeryou finished 3rd in Brossard, Québec. He lost in the semi-finals to Samuel Murray, 15–7, 15–12, but beat Pedro Castro, 15–10, 15–6, in the 3rd place match. Then in early 2016, Landeryou won the 2nd National Team Selection Event in Grande Prairie, Alberta by beating Mike Green in the final, 12–15, 15–10, 11–2. He reached the final with a win over Murray, 10–15, 15–12, 11–9, in the semi-finals. The win was Landeryou's 3rd career Selection Event title.

Landeryou played doubles at the 2016 Pan American Championships in San Luis Potosi, Mexico with Pedro Castro. The pair came home with bronze medals after losing in the semi-finals to Mexicans Alejandro Landa and Javier Moreno, 15–11, 14–15, 11–4. They got to the semis by defeating Costa Ricans Felipe Camacho and Teobaldo Fumero, 15–11, 13–15, 11–6.

Landeryou was runner up in singles at the 2016 Canadian Championships in Burlington, Ontario. He reached the final with a win over Nicholas Bousquet, 15–8, 15–10, but lost in the final to Mike Green, 15–6, 15–8. He came 3rd in doubles with Eric Desrochers, as they lost to Pedro Castro and Samuel Murray, 15–12, 15–12, in the semi-finals, but won the 3rd place match versus Lee Connell and Nathaniel Husulak, 15–8, 15–13.

At the 2016 World Championships in Cali, Colombia, Landeryou played doubles with Mike Green, and they lost in the quarterfinals to Bolivians Kadim Carrasco and Carlos Keller, 6-15, 15–2, 11–8.

At the National Team Selection Event in November 2016 in Valleyfield, Québec, Landeryou was 4th. He lost to Samuel Murray, 15–9, 15–13, in the semi-finals, and defaulted the 3rd place match versus Mike Green. Then in February 2017, Landeryou finished 3rd at the National Team Selection Event in Calgary. He lost to Samuel Murray, 15–8, 15–2, in the semi-finals, but won 3rd place, when Pedro Castro was injured during the 3rd place match.

Landeryou played doubles in the 2017 Pan American Championships with Pedro Castro in San José, Costa Rica, where the lost out in the quarterfinals to the Dominican Republic team of Ramon De Leon and Luis Perez, 15–6, 15–10.

In the 2017 Canadian Championships in Brossard, Québec, Landeryou lost to Samuel Murray, 15–9, 15–13, in the semi-finals of singles, and then won the 3rd place match against his brother James Landeryou, 15–6, 15–10. In doubles, Landeryou played with his brother James, and they were defeated in the quarterfinals by Mike Green and Trevor Webb, 15–6, 10–15, 11–1.

Landeryou was runner-up at both National Team Selection Events in the 2017–18 season. In November 2017 in Vernon, British Columbia, he lost in the final to Samuel Murray, 15–13, 15–8, after defeating Mike Green in the semi-finals, 15–17, 15–3, 11–5. Then in February 2018, Landeryou lost again to Murray in the final in Kitchener, Ontario, 15–13, 15–3.

At the 2018 Canadian Championships, Landeryou finished 3rd in singles, as after losing to Coby Iwaasa, 15–6, 15–13, in the semi-finals, he had a walkover win against Pedro Castro for 3rd. In doubles, he partnered with brother James Landeryou, and they lost to eventual champions Coby Iwaasa and Samuel Murray, 15–13, 15–10, in the semi-finals, and finished 3rd by defeating Lee Connell and Trevor Webb, 15–3, 15–12.

Landeryou played Men's Doubles with Samuel Murray at the 2018 World Championships, and they earned bronze medals, as they defeated Argentina's Fernando Kurzbard and Shai Manzuri, 15–3, 15–8, in the quarterfinals, but then lost to the USA's Rocky Carson and Sudsy Monchik, 15–12, 15–2, in the semi-finals.

== Career winds down (2018-2020) ==
In the first National Team Selection Event of the following season, Landeryou finished 3rd in November 2018 in Valleyfield, Québec. He lost to Coby Iwaasa, 15–8, 15–13, in the semi-finals, and had a default win over Pedro Castro in the 3rd place match. At the second National Team Selection Event in February 2019 in Grande Prairie, Alberta, Landeryou lost in the quarterfinals to Trevor Webb, 15–11, 15–8.

At the 2019 Canadian Championships, Landeryou finished 3rd in singles. After losing to Coby Iwaasa, 15–13, 15–2, in the semi-finals, he defeated Trevor Webb, 15–8, 15–7, in the 3rd place match. But in doubles, he and James Landeryou got to the final for the first time, but they lost to another brother team in Samuel Murray and Tommy Murray, 17–15, 10–15, 11–1.

In November 2019, Landeryou finished 3rd at the National Team Selection Event in Sherwood Park, Alberta. He lost to Coby Iwaasa, 15–11, 15–10, and then captured 3rd when Trevor Webb defaulted their match due to injury. Then in February 2020, Landeryou finished 3rd at the National Team Selection Event in Winnipeg, where he lost to Coby Iwaasa, 15–7, 15–12, and then beat Kurtis Cullen in the 3rd place match, 15–4, 15–3.

That would prove to be Landeryou's last national event appearance, as he announced his retirement in August, 2020.

== Career summary ==
Landeryou's most impressive results came while competing with Team Canada, which he did 14 times, winning 9 medals, including gold in Men's Doubles with Mike Green at the 2010 Pan American Racquetball Championships. He also won medals in doubles with Pedro Castro, Vincent Gagnon, Samuel Murray and Kris Odegard.

Landeryou was a finalist at the Canadian Championships six times: four times in singles and twice in doubles with two different partners: Pedro Castro and his brother James Landeryou. Also, he won three National Team Selection Events, in 2012, 2013 and 2016.

Landeryou didn't play on the International Racquetball Tour (IRT) very often. Only in the 2014–15 season did he play most of the IRT events. That season Landeryou finished ranked 16th with his best finish being in the Round of 16, which he did in seven of the ten events he played.

=== Career record ===
This table lists Landeryou's results across annual events.

Event	2003	2004	2005	2006	2007	2008	2009	2010	2011	2012	2013	2014	2015	2016	2017	2018	2019	2020
National Team Selection Event #1						4th*		QF	3rd	4th	W	QF	4th	3rd	4th	F	3rd	3rd
National Team Selection Event #2		QF	QF	32	QF	16	16	4th	3rd	3rd	W	3rd	4th	W	3rd	F	QF	3rd
Canadian National Doubles		4th	QF		3rd	3rd	3rd	4th	4th	QF	QF	F	3rd	3rd	QF	3rd	F	X
Canadian National Singles	16	16	QF		QF	QF	QF	F	4th	3rd	F	F	QF	F	3rd	3rd	3rd	X

Note: W = winner, F = finalist, SF = semi-finalist, QF = quarterfinalist, 16 = Round of 16, 32 = Round of 32, X = Cancelled due to COVID Pandemic. The years refer to the year the event occurred, except for National Team Selection Event #1, which occurs at the end of the previous year. That is, Selection Event #1 and #2 occur in different calendar years, as the racquetball season goes from September to May/June with the first Selection Event happening earlier in the season than the second.

== Personal life ==
Landeryou has a B.Sc. in Kinesiology from the University of Saskatchewan. He married Kaitlyn Schmeiser in 2012, and they live in Saskatoon, Saskatchewan.

Landeryou also played squash, and competed for Saskatchewan at the 2013 Canadian Team Championships in Montreal, where Saskatchewan finished 8th.

He is now one of Racquetball Canada's National Training Coaches, and was an assistant coach for Team Canada at the 2024 World Championships and head coach for the 2026 World Championships.

== See also ==
- List of racquetball players
