= Vincent Gagnon =

Canadian racquetball player (born 1981)

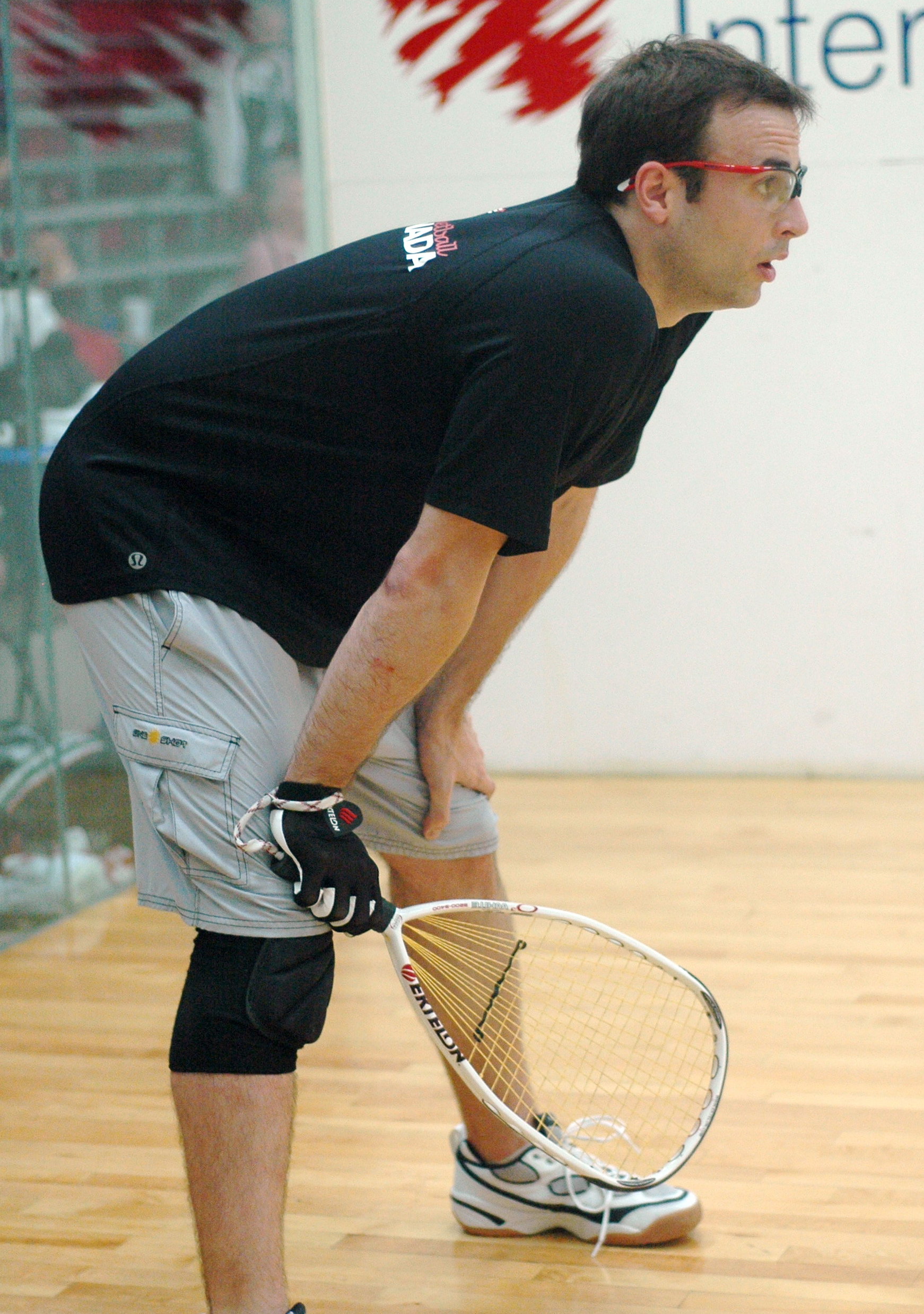
- Gagnon at 2007 US Open

Personal information
- Nationality: Canadian
- Born: September 5, 1981 (age 45) Saint-Constant, Quebec

Sport
- Sport: Racquetball
- Coached by: Michel Gagnon
- Retired: 2016

Achievements and titles
- National finals: 1st Singles 2014, 1st Doubles 2008, 2009, 2012, 2014
Medal record
Men's racquetball
Representing Canada
Pan American Games
Bronze medal – third place	2015 Pan Am Games	Doubles
Bronze medal – third place	2015 Pan Am Games	Team event
Bronze medal – third place	2011 Pan Am Games	Singles
World Championships
Silver medal – second place	2014 Burlington	Doubles
Silver medal – second place	2012 Santo Domingo	Team
Bronze medal – third place	2010 Seoul	Singles
Silver medal – second place	2010 Seoul	Team
Bronze medal – third place	2008 Kingscourt	Singles
Bronze medal – third place	2008 Kingscourt	Team
Pan American Championships
Bronze medal – third place	2014 Santa Cruz	Singles
Bronze medal – third place	2012 Temuco	Singles
Bronze medal – third place	2011 Managua	Singles
Gold medal – first place	2007 Santiago	Doubles
Bronze medal – third place	2008 San Jose	Singles
Bronze medal – third place	2001 San Pedro Sula	Doubles
World Games
Bronze medal – third place	2009 World Games	Singles

Vincent Gagnon (born September 5, 1981) is a Canadian retired racquetball player from Montreal. Gagnon won five Canadian Championships: four doubles titles and one singles. He also competed for Canada 19 times, winning multiple medals highlighted by gold at the 2007 Pan American Championships in Men's Doubles with François Viens.

== Junior Years ==
Gagnon began playing racquetball at 9, and was introduced to it by his father Michel Gagnon, who was his coach throughout his career – and is one of Racquetball Canada's National Team coaches. Although introduced to the sport early, Gagnon's success as a junior didn't come until his late teens when he won three consecutive Canadian Junior Championships. The first was in Boy's U16 Singles in 1998, and then in Boy's U18 Doubles with Jean-Philippe Morin in 1999, and finally in Boy's U18 Singles in 2000, which was his last year of juniors.

== Racquetball career ==
=== Career begins (2001–2006) ===
Gagnon won the National Team Doubles Selection Event in 2001 with Francis Guillemette by defeating Kris Odegard and Ryan Powell in the final. The win qualified them to play on Team Canada for the 2001 Pan American Championships, which was the first appearances on the team for both of them. The 2001 Pan Am Championships were in San Pedro Sula, Honduras, where Gagnon and Guillemette earned bronze medals.

Gagnon and Francis Guillemette finished 5th at the 2002 National Team Doubles Selection Event in Saskatoon, Saskatchewan, as they lost to Mike Ceresia and Corey Osborne in the quarterfinals. In the Singles Selection Event that season, Gagnon finished 6th, after losing to Kane Waselenchuk, 15–10, 15–5, in the quarterfinals.

Gagnon and Francis Guillemette finished 4th at the 2003 National Team Doubles Selection Event in Saskatoon, Saskatchewan, where they lost to Corey Osborne and François Viens in the semi-finals, and then dropped the 3rd place match versus Mike Green and Tom O’Brien. Gagnon was 3rd in the Singles Selection Event that season, as he beat Corey Osborne in the 3rd place match, 11–15, 15–7, 11–7.

Gagnon lost in the quarterfinals of Men's Singles to Corey Osborne, 8–15, 15–12, 11–8, at the 2003 Canadian Championships in Vancouver. In Men's Doubles, Gagnon and Francis Guillemette lost in the semi-finals to Mike Ceresia and Brian Istace, 15–13, 17–15. They finished 3rd as Mike Green and Tom O’Brien defaulted the 3rd place match.

Gagnon's 2nd Team Canada appearance was at the 2003 Pan Am Championships in Santo Domingo, Dominican Republic, where Gagnon was a bronze medalist in Men's Singles, losing to American Jack Huczek, 15–7, 15–7, in the semi-finals.

Gagnon and Francis Guillemette finished 7th at the 2004 National Team Doubles Selection Event in Saskatoon, Saskatchewan, as they lost in the quarterfinals to Mike McPhee and Bill Shepley, 13–15, 15–9, 11–6. In the 7th place match, they defeated Eric Desrochers and Tim Landeryou, 15–7, 15–9. In the Singles Selection Event in Brossard, Québec, Gagnon lost to Brian Istace in the semi-finals, but won the 3rd place match against Corey Osborne, 15–4, 10–15, 11–1.

At the 2004 Nationals in Burlington, Ontario, Gagnon and Francis Guillemette were seeded 4th but were upset by Eric Desrochers and Tim Landeryou, 15–14, 15–2, in the quarterfinals.

In the 2004–05 season, Gagnon began playing doubles with François Viens. They finished 3rd at the National Team Doubles Selection Event in Calgary, where they beat Tim Landeryou and Scott Lineker, 15–6, 15–9, in the quarterfinals. Then in the final four playoff, they beat Eric Desrochers and Corey Osborne, but lost to both Mike Green and Brian Valin and to Brian Istace and Kris Odegard. In the Singles Selection Event, Gagnon reached the final for the first time by coming back from a game down to defeat Brian Istace, 5–15, 15–5, 13–11. He faced Mike Green in the final, and Green won in a tie-breaker, 16–14, 6–15, 11–5.

At the 2005 Canadian Championships in Regina, Saskatchewan Gagnon lost in the singles quarterfinals to Kris Odegard, 13–15, 15–3, 11–1. In doubles, Gagnon and François Viens reached the final by beating Odegard and Ryan Powell, 15–8, 15–6, in the semi-finals. But they lost the final against Mike Green and Brian Istace, 15–6, 15–5.

At the 2006 National Team Doubles Selection Event in Calgary, Gagnon and François Viens finished 3rd behind Mike Green and Brian Istace in 1st and Francis Guillemette and Kris Odegard in 2nd. Burnaby, British Columbia was the site of the Singles Selection Event, and Gagnon finished 2nd behind Green, who beat him 15–9, 15–7, in the final four round.

Gagnon was upset in the Men's Singles Round of 16 at the 2006 Canadian Championships in Edmonton, where he lost to Tim Landeryou, 13–15, 15–6, 11–9. He and François Viens were runners up in Men's Doubles, as they beat Francis Guillemette and Kris Odegard in the semi-finals, 18–16, 11–15, 11–8, but lost in the final to Mike Green and Brian Istace, 15–7, 15–10.

=== International gold & 1st Selection Event win (2007–2012) ===
At the 2007 National Team Doubles Selection Event in Victoria, British Columbia, Gagnon and François Viens finished 2nd after losing to Mike Green and Brian Istace, 15–10, 15–10. But in Brossard, Québec Gagnon won the Singles Selection Event for the first time in 2007, when he defeated Green, Kris Odegard and Viens in the final four playoff round.

Gagnon captured gold in Men's Doubles with François Viens at the 2007 Pan American Championships in Santiago, Chile, where he and Viens defeated Americans Andy Hawthorne and Jason Samora in the final, 15–6, 11–15, 11–9.

At the 2007 Canadian Championships, Gagnon lost in the semi-finals of singles to Kris Odegard, but won the 3rd place match against Ryan Smith. He got to the semis by defeating Tim Landeryou in the quarterfinals. He played doubles with François Viens and they were runners up to Mike Green and Brian Istace.

In the 2007–08 National Team Selection Events, Gagnon and François Viens came 2nd in the Doubles Selection Event, behind only Green and Brian Istace, who beat them 15–11, 15–12. At the Singles Selection Event, Gagnon made the final four playoff by defeating James Landeryou, 15–8, 15–11, in the quarterfinals. However, he suffered an injury in the playoff round, so finished 4th.

Gagnon and François Viens won Men's Doubles at the 2008 Canadian Championships defeating beating Green and Brian Istace in the final, 15–13, 6–15, 11–6. They beat Francis Guillemette and Kris Odegard in the semi-finals, 15–10, 3–11, 11–3, to reach the final. Gagnon was also in the finals of Men's Singles, as he defeated Odegard in the semis, 15–11, 7–15, 11–6. But he lost the final to Green, 15–8, 15–11.

Despite the being National Champions in doubles, Gagnon played singles at the 2008 World Championships in Kingscourt, Ireland, where he was a bronze medalist in Men's Singles by beating Mexican Polo Gutierrez, 15–5, 11–15, 11–8, in the quarterfinals, but losing to Jack Huczek of the US, 15–11, 15–8, in the semi-finals. He also earned bronze in the Men's Team event, as Canada defeated Costa Rica in the quarterfinals, 2–1, lost to Mexico in the semi-finals, 2–1, but beat Bolivia, 2–1, for the bronze medal.

In the National Team Doubles Selection Event in Windsor, Ontario, Gagnon and François Viens finished 2nd behind Green and Brian Istace, who defeated them 15–11, 15–12, in the final four playoff. Gagnon finished 4th at the National Team Singles Selection Event in Brossard, Québec in February 2009. He beat Francis Guillemette, 15–3, 15–9, to qualify for the final four playoff round, but didn't win a match in the playoff.

At the 2009 Pan American Championships in Cali, Colombia, Gagnon played Men's Singles, and he lost in the quarterfinals to the USA's Andy Hawthorne, 11–15, 15–8, 11–2.

Edmonton hosted the 2009 Canadian Championships, and there Gagnon and François Viens won Men's Doubles by defeating Green and Eric Desrochers in the final, and beating James Landeryou and Tim Landeryou in the semi-finals, 15–11, 15–5. In Men's Singles, Gagnon finished 3rd, as he lost to Green in the semi-finals, 15–1, 15–12, but got a win over Francis Guillemette due to an injury default.

Gagnon won bronze at the 2009 World Games in Kaohsiung, Taiwan, where he defeated Mexican Álvaro Beltrán, in the bronze medal match, 15–11, 12–15, 11–7. In that tournament, Gagnon defeated Daniel Maggi of Argentina in the Round of 16, then Fernando Rios of Ecuador in the quarterfinals, but lost to Jack Huczek of the US in the semi-finals, 3–15, 15–8, 11–7, which put him in the bronze medal match.

Gagnon was on Team Canada for the 2010 Pan American Championships in San Pedro Sula, Honduras. He beat Andres Herrera of Colombia in the Round of 16, 15–4, 15–5, but lost to eventual champion Ricardo Monroy of Bolivia, 15–10, 15–7, in the quarterfinals. This was Odegard's 3rd consecutive bronze medal at the Pan Am Championships.

Gagnon was the #1 men's player in Canada from June 22, 2010 to February 23, 2011, although he hadn't won a national championship in singles. But Gagnon did win the 2010 National Team Selection Event.

Gagnon was on Team Canada for the 2010 World Championships in Seoul, South Korea, where he earned two medals: a bronze medal in Men's Singles and silver in the Men's Team event. Gagnon defeated Colombian Francisco Gomez in the quarterfinals, but lost to the USA's Jack Huczek in the semi-finals, 15–12, 15–12. In the Men's Team event, Canada beat Ecuador in the quarterfinals, Costa Rica in the semi-finals, before losing to the US in final.

Gagnon played at the US Open Racquetball Championships several times, although he didn't have much success in the International Racquetball Tour (IRT) division. However, Gagnon was in three consecutive Men's Open finals at the US Open, winning back to back titles in 2009 and 2010 after losing in 2008. His successful title defence in 2010 came at the expense of two Canadians: in the semi-finals Gagnon defeated Kris Odegard, 4–15, 15–9, 11–7, and in the final beat Tim Landeryou, 15–6, 15–13.

Although Gagnon didn't play the first National Team Selection Event of 2009–10, he won the second event, sweeping the final four playoff round with wins over Mike Green, Tim Landeryou and Kris Odegard.

At the 2010 Canadian Championships in Burnaby, British Columbia, Gagnon finished 3rd, as he lost in the semi-finals to Mike Green, 15–9, 15–12, but then won the 3rd place match against Kris Odegard, 15–10, 15–1. In doubles, he and François Viens were in the finals, but lost to Green and Odegard, 14–16, 15–10, 11–7. They reached the final with a win over Francis Guillemette and Corey Osborne, 6–15, 15–13, 11–3.

Gagnon won the first National Team Selection Event of 2010–11 in Edmonton by defeating Tim Landeryou in the semi-finals, 8–15, 15–13, 11–3, and his former doubles partner Francis Guillemette in the final, 15–8, 15–3. Gagnon was also in the final of the second selection that season in Brossard, Québec, but that time he lost to Mike Green, 10–15, 15–7, 11–4.

Gagnon competed in the 2011 Pan American Championships in Mangua, Nicaragua, where he reached the semi-finals with a win over then defending champion Ricardo Monroy of Bolivia, 5–15, 15–14, 11–5. But Gagnon lost in the semis to Mexican Daniel De La Rosa, 15–13, 15–4, so he was a bronze medalist.

At the 2011 Canadian Championships in Nova Scotia, Gagnon was a finalist in Men's Singles, losing to Mike Green, 15–4, 15–6, in the final. He got to the final with a win over Kris Odegard in the semi-finals, 17–15, 15–1. In doubles, Gagnon and François Viens lost to Francis Guillemette and Corey Osborne in the semi-finals, 15–11, 10–15, 12–10, but won the 3rd place match versus James Landeryou and Tim Landeryou, 15–5, 15–3.

Gagnon competed at the Pan American Games for the first time in 2011 in Guadalajara, Mexico, where he earned bronze in Men's singles by defeating Luis Pérez of the Dominican Republic, 15–7, 15–9, in the quarterfinals, but losing to Mexican Gilberto Meija, 11–15, 15–14, 11–5, in the semi-finals.

In the 2011–12 National Team Selection Events, Gagnon finished 2nd in the first event in Oakville, Ontario, losing the final to Mike Green, 15–8, 15–0. But Gagnon bounced back to win the second National Team Selection Event in Regina, Saskatchewan, where he beat Kris Odegard, 15–11, 10–15, 11–8, in the final. He defeated Nathaniel Husulak in the semi-finals, 15–8, 15–5.

Gagnon went to Temuco, Chile for the 2012 Pan American Championships, and came home with a bronze medal after losing to Fernando Rios of Ecuador in the semi-finals.

In 2012 in Brossard, Québec, Gagnon and François Viens won Men's Doubles for the 3rd time at the Canadian Championships, by defeating Pedro Castro and Eric Desrochers in the final, 15–8, 8–15, 11–9. They got to the final with a tie-breaker win over Francis Guillemette and Corey Osborne, 15–2, 14–16, 11–4. In singles that year, Gagnon was runner up to Mike Green, losing the final, 15–2, 15–8, after beating Kris Odegard, 15–8, 7–15, 11–3, in the semi-finals.

Gagnon partnered with Mike Green to play Men's Doubles at the 2012 World Championships in Santo Domingo, Dominican Republic, where they lost in the quarterfinals to Bolivians Roland Keller and Ricardo Monroy, 15–10, 15–11. But in the Men's Team competition Canada defeated Ecuador in the quarterfinals, Mexico in the semi-finals, before losing to the US in the final, so Gagnon came home with a silver medal from that event.

After Worlds in 2012, Gagnon took the 2012–13 season off, during which his first child was born.

=== Successful return (2013–15) ===
He returned to competition in the 2013–14 season, when Gagnon was 2nd at both the National Team Selection Events. At the first in Winnipeg, Gagnon was runner up to Mike Green, losing in the final, 15–10, 15–12. He beat Samuel Murray, 7–15, 15–11, 11–5, in the semi-finals. At the second selection event in Brossard, Québec, Vincent Gagnon defeated Tim Landeryou, 15–13, 13–15, 11–9, in the semi-finals, but again lost to Green in the final, 15–8, 15–8.

Gagnon won both singles and doubles at the 2014 Canadian Championships in Brossard, Québec. In doing so, he became the first Québec born player to win the Canadian Men's Singles Championship. He defeated Tim Landeryou in the singles final, 15–5, 13–15, 11–5, after beating Coby Iwaasa in the semi-finals, 15–10, 15–17, 11–6. Gagnon played doubles with Samuel Murray, and they beat Tim Landeryou and Pedro Castro in the final, 15–12, 15–2. They reached the final with a win over Francis Guillemette and Corey Osborne, 15–8, 15–10.

Gagnon became the fifth man to win both singles and doubles at the same Canadian Championships, after Wayne Bowes (twice), Mike Ceresia, Kane Waselenchuk and Mike Green (five times). Coby Iwaasa and Samuel Murray (twice) have done it since.

Gagnon had a chance to win a World Championship in 2014 in Men's Doubles on home soil in Burlington, Ontario, as he and Mike Green got to the final with a win over the USA's Ben Croft and Tom Fuhrmann in the semi-finals, 15–11, 15–2. But it was not to be, as they lost to Colombians Sebastian Franco and Alejandro Herrera in the final, 15–11, 15–5.

Nonetheless, with two Canadian Championships and a career best finish at Worlds, 2014 was arguably Gagnon's best year.

The first National Team Selection Event of 2014–15 was in Kitchener, Ontario, where Gagnon was a finalist. He defeated Tim Landeryou in the semi-finals, 15–7, 15–10, but lost to Mike Green, 15–13, 15–1, in the final. In the second selection event, Gagnon was 3rd, as he was upset by Pedro Castro in the semi-finals, 15–12, 15–13, but defeated Tim Landeryou in the 3rd place match, 15–12, 15–13.

Gagnon played Men's Doubles with Mike Green at the 2015 Pan American Championships in Santo Domingo, Dominican Republic, where they lost in the quarterfinals to Costa Ricans, Felipe Camacho and Teobaldo Fumero, 2–15, 15–11, 11–8.

In Burnaby, British Columbia, Gagnon was 3rd in singles at the 2015 Canadian Championships, as he lost in the semi-finals to Samuel Murray, 15–10, 15–10, and then got a default win from Mike Green. In doubles, Gagnon and Murray lost in the doubles semi-finals to Green and Coby Iwaasa, 15–9, 9–15, 11–4, and then dropped the 3rd place match to Pedro Castro and Tim Landeryou, 15–13, 15–12, so finished 4th.

Gagnon competed in the Pan American Games for the second time of his career in 2015, when he partnered with Tim Landeryou for Men's doubles at the 2015 Pan American Games in Toronto. They defeated Argentina's Daniel Maggi and Shai Mazuri in the quarterfinals, but lost to Bolivians Roland Keller and Conrado Moscoso, 15–9, 15–11, in the semi-finals, resulting in bronze medals for them. Gagnon captured a second bronze medal in Toronto, as Canada defeated the Dominican Republic in the quarterfinals, but lost to the US in the semi-finals of the Men's Team event.

== Career summary ==
Gagnon won five Canadian Championships: four times in doubles and one in singles. The first three doubles titles were with François Viens and the last with Samuel Murray. He won both singles and doubles in 2014.

Gagnon competed with Team Canada 19 times, winning 16 medals, including gold in Men's Doubles with François Viens at the 2007 Pan American Racquetball Championships. He also won medals in doubles with Mike Green, Francis Guillemette and Tim Landeryou.

Gagnon rarely played on the International Racquetball Tour (IRT), at most a few times a season. His best result was a quarterfinal finish in 2011.

=== Career record ===
This table lists Gagnon's results across annual events.

Event	2001	2002	2003	2004	2005	2006	2007	2008	2009	2010	2011	2012	2013	2014	2015
National Team Selection Event #1	W*	QF*	4th*	7th*	3rd*	3rd*	F*	F*	F*	-	W	F	-	F	F
National Team Selection Event #2	-	QF	3rd	3rd	F	F	W	4th	4th	W	F	W	-	F	3rd
Canadian National Doubles	QF	F	3rd	QF	F	F	F	W	W	F	3rd	W	-	W	4th
Canadian National Singles	16	4th	QF	3rd	QF	16	3rd	F	3rd	3rd	F	F	-	W	3rd

Note: W = winner, F = finalist, SF = semi-finalist, QF = quarterfinalist, 16 = Round of 16, 32 = Round of 32. The years refer to the year the event occurred, except for National Team Selection Event #1, which occurs at the end of the previous year. That is, Selection Event #1 and #2 occur in different calendar years, as the racquetball season goes from September to May/June with the first Selection Event happening earlier in the season than the second. Also, an * indicates the first selection event was a doubles event.

== Personal life ==
Gagnon is the son of Michel Gagnon, one of the Racquetball Canada's National Team coaches, and step-son of former National Team player Josée Grand'Maître.

He has a master's degree in mathematics in 2008 from Université de Montréal.

Gagnon was featured in one of CNN's sports photos of the year, as he was photographed jumping in the air to avoid a shot by Jose Rojas of the USA during their doubles match at the 2015 Pan American Games.

In 2020, Gagnon was inducted into the Racquetball Canada Hall of Fame.

== See also ==
- List of racquetball players
