= Racquetball at the 2009 World Games – men's singles =

2009 World Games – Racquetball Single Men
Host	(Taiwan) Kaohsiung
Dates	July 21–23, 2009
Teams	15
Podium
Champions	(United States) Jack Huczek
Runners-up	(United States) Rocky Carson
Third place	(Canada) Vincent Gagnon
Fourth place	(Mexico) Álvaro Beltrán

The racquetball – men's singles competition at the World Games 2009 took place from July 21 to 23 at the Chung Cheng Martial Arts Stadium in Kaohsiung, Taiwan. Players qualified for this event from their performances at the 2008 Racquetball World Championships.

== Last 16 ==
Rocky Carson (United States)	BYE
Mike Green (Canada)	2–0	(Bolivia) Ricardo Monroy
Leopoldo Gutierrez (Mexico)	2–0	(Bolivia) Jorge Zambrana
Ivan Villegas (Costa Rica)	1–2	(Mexico) Álvaro Beltrán
Vincent Gagnon (Canada)	2–0	(Argentina) Daniel Maggi
Fernando Rios (Ecuador)	2–0	(Japan) Takaaki Hirose
Felipe Camacho (Costa Rica)	1–2	(Japan) Michimune Kono
Sang Soo Lee (South Korea)	0–2	(United States) Jack Huczek

== Last 8 ==
Quarter-finals
(United States) Rocky Carson	2
(Canada) Mike Green	0
(Mexico) Leopoldo Gutierrez	0
(Mexico) Álvaro Beltrán	2
(Canada) Vincent Gagnon	2
(Ecuador) Fernando Rios	1
(Japan) Michimune Kono	0
(United States) Jack Huczek	2

Semi-finals
(United States) Rocky Carson	2
(Mexico) Álvaro Beltrán	0
(Canada) Vincent Gagnon	0
(United States) Jack Huczek	2

Final
(United States) Rocky Carson	1
(United States) Jack Huczek	2
Third place
(Canada) Vincent Gagnon	2
(Mexico) Álvaro Beltrán	1
