= Kris Odegard =

Canadian racquetball player (born 1980)

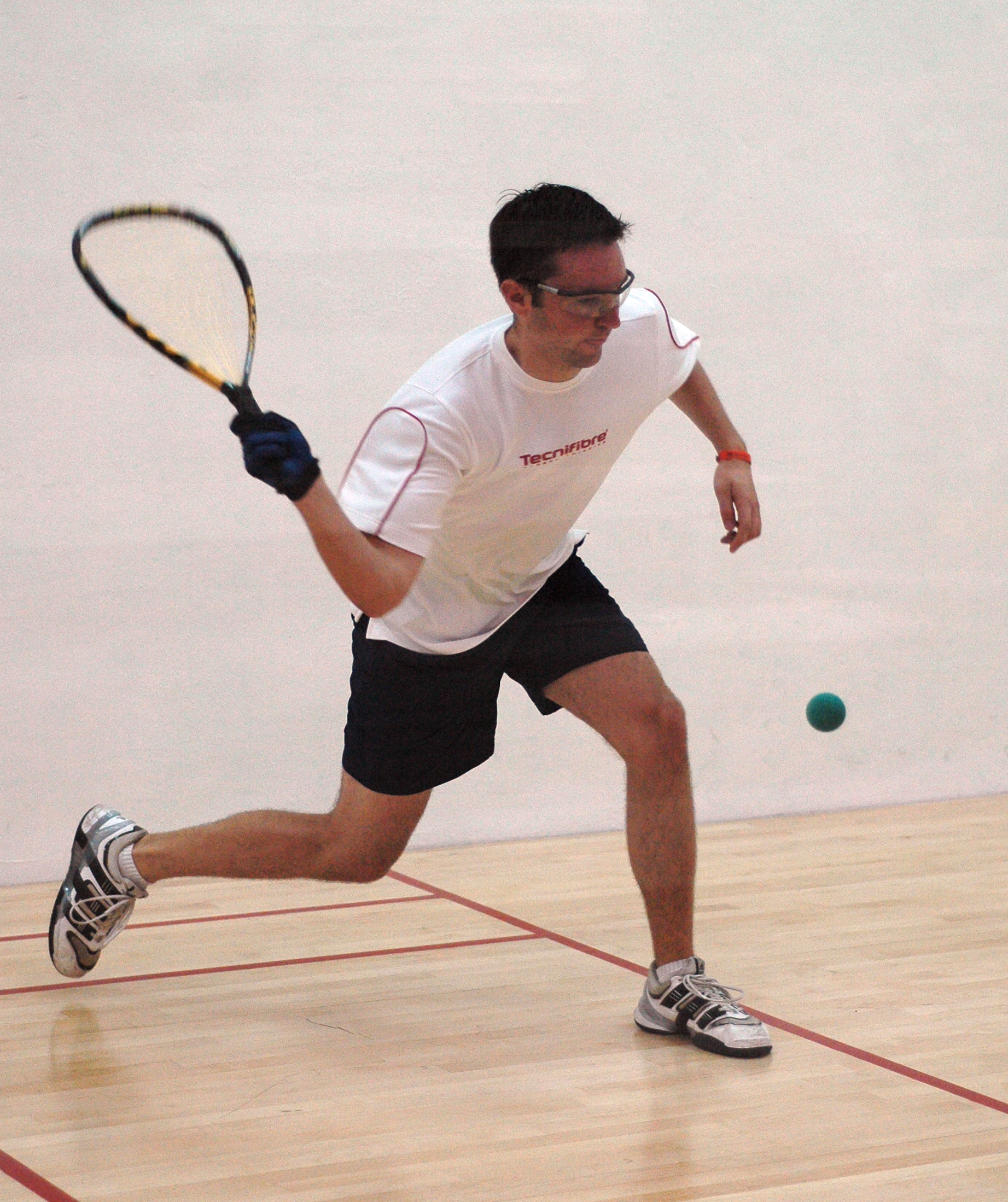
- Odegard at 2006 Worlds

Personal information
- Nationality: Canadian
- Born: February 29, 1980 (age 46) Saskatoon, Saskatchewan
- Height: 6 ft 1 in (185 cm)

Sport
- Sport: Racquetball
- College team: Colorado State University-Pueblo, University of Saskatchewan
- Retired: 2012

Achievements and titles
- National finals: 1st 2007, 2009 (singles), 1st 2010, 2011 (doubles)
Medal record
Men's racquetball
Representing Canada
Pan American Games
| Bronze medal – third place | 2011 Guadalajara | Doubles |
World Championships
| Silver medal – second place | 2012 Santo Domingo | Team |
| Silver medal – second place | 2010 Seoul | Team |
| Bronze medal – third place | 2008 Kingscourt | Team |
| Silver medal – second place | 2006 Santo Domingo | Team |
Pan American Championships
| Bronze medal – third place | 2011 Managua | Doubles |
| Bronze medal – third place | 2010 San Pedro Sula | Singles |
| Bronze medal – third place | 2009 Cali | Singles |
| Bronze medal – third place | 2008 San Jose | Singles |
| Silver medal – second place | 2007 Santiago | Singles |
| Gold medal – first place | 2006 Guatemala City | Singles |

Kris Odegard (born February 29, 1980) is a Canadian retired racquetball player from Saskatoon, Saskatchewan. Odegard won four Canadian Championships – two in singles and two in doubles. He also won several medals in international competition as part of Team Canada highlighted by gold in Men's Singles at the 2006 Pan American Championships.

== Junior years ==
Odegard was a prodigious junior player, winning four Canadian Junior titles in singles and three in doubles. He won back to back Boy's U14 Canadian Junior Championships in 1994 and 1995, then back to back Boy's U16 titles in 1996 and 1997. His three Boys' doubles titles were also consecutive, as he won Boy's U14 Doubles in 1993 with Eric Urteaga, then two more U14 titles with Alan Chong in 1994 and 1995.

Odegard won two singles titles at the International Racquetball Federation World Junior Championships. He won Boy's U12 in 1993, and Boys U16 in 1997, when defeated fellow Canadian Kane Waselenchuk in the final, 15–8, 15–8. After the win in 1997, Odegard was the Saskatchewan Sport Athlete of the Month in December 1997.

In 1998 his last year of junior eligibility, Odegard was a quarterfinalist in Boy's U18 Singles at World Juniors.

Odegard won three U18 Mixed Doubles titles at World Juniors. He won it in 1996 with Amanda MacDonald, and then back to back titles with his sister Karina Odegard in 1998 and 1999.

Odegard attended the University of Southern Colorado at Pueblo in 1998–99, and was a member of their team that won the 1999 USA Racquetball Intercollegiate Men's Team title by winning both the Men's #5 Singles title and the Men's #2 Doubles title with Erin Brannigan

== Career begins (2000–2005) ==
As Odegard moved from junior competition to national team competitions, he was hampered by a debilitating injury. Nonetheless, he had some success in doubles playing with Ryan Powell.

Odegard and Powell were 4th in Men's Doubles at the 2000 Canadian Championships in Burnaby, British Columbia. Then they were finalists at the 2001 National Team Doubles Selection Event in Winnipeg, where they lost to Vincent Gagnon and Francis Guillemette, narrowly missing out on a spot on Team Canada for the Pan American Championships.

Odegard and Ryan Powell were 6th in Men's Doubles at the 2001 Canadian Championships in Vancouver, British Columbia.

In the 2001–02 season, Odegard and Ryan Powell lost to Mike Green and Tom O’Brien in the quarterfinals of the 2002 National Team Doubles Selection Event in Saskatoon, and lost the 5th place match to Vincent Gagnon and Francis Guillemette, and then at the 2002 National Team Singles Selection Event in Brossard, Québec, Odegard lost in the quarterfinals to Brian Istace, 15–6, 15–4.

Odegard lost in the Round of 16 in Men's Singles to Kam Barteski, 16–14, 5–15, 11–0, at the 2002 Canadian Championships in Brossard, Québec. In Men's Doubles, Odegard and Ryan Powell lost to Mike Ceresia and Gary Waite in the quarterfinals, 15–4, 9–15, 11–4.

In the 2002–03 season, Odegard played doubles with Greg Starodub, and they reached the quarterfinals of the 2003 National Team Doubles Selection Event in Saskatoon, where they lost to Corey Osborne and François Viens.

At the 2003 National Team Selection Event in Niagara on the Lake, Ontario, Odegard lost in the quarterfinals to Brian Istace, 15–4, 15–5.

Odegard lost in the Round of 16 at the 2003 Canadian Championships in Vancouver, British Columbia to Chris Brumwell in a tie-breaker. He and Greg Starodub lost in the Men's Doubles quarterfinals to Vincent Gagnon and Francis Guillemette, 15–8, 15–11.

Odegard and Brian Istace finished 3rd in the 2004 National Team Doubles Selection Event in Saskatoon, where they beat Mike McPhee and Bill Shepley for 3rd, 15–6, 15–12, after losing in the semi-finals to Corey Osborne and François Viens, 14–15, 15–4, 11–8.

In the 2004 National Team Singles Selection Event in Victoria, British Columbia, Odegard lost to Tom O’Brien, 15–6, 15–8, in the Round of 16, and ended up finishing 10th after losing the 9th place match to Jason Ully, 5–15, 15–7, 11–7.

Odegard was 6th in Men's Singles at the 2004 Canadian Championships in Burlington, Ontario, and 2nd in Men's Doubles with Brian Istace, as they lost the final to Mike Green and Tom O’Brien, 15–8, 15–5.

Odegard and Brian Istace finished 2nd in the 2005 National Team Doubles Selection Event in Calgary, losing to only Mike Green and Brian Valin in the final four playoff, 15–13, 15–9. In the 2005 National Team Singles Selection Event, Odegard lost to Hugo Laprise, 3–15, 15–13, 11–9, in the Round of 16.

Odegard got to the Men's Singles final at the Canadian Championships for the first time in 2005 in Regina, Saskatchewan, where he was the 6th seed but beat 3rd seed Vincent Gagnon, 13–15, 15–3, 11–1, in the quarterfinals, then knocked of 2nd seed Brian Istace in the semi-finals, 15–13, 15–9. But he lost the final to Corey Osborne in a tie-breaker, 15–5, 6–15, 11–5. In Men's Doubles, Odegard and Ryan Powell beat Tim Landeryou and Hugo Laprise, 15–7, 9–15, 11–3, in the quarterfinals, but lost in the semi-finals to Vincent Gagnon and François Viens, 15–8, 15–6, and dropped the 3rd place match to Eric Desrochers and Osborne, 17–15, 15–11.

Odegard and Francis Guillemette finished 2nd in the 2006 National Team Doubles Selection Event in Calgary, losing to only Mike Green and Brian Istace in the final four playoff, 17–15, 14–16, 11–1. In the 2006 National Team Singles Selection Event, Odegard finished 4th, as he qualified for the final four playoff but lost to the other three players: Mike Green, Vincent Gagnon and Brian Istace.

== Making the National team, winning internationally & nationally (2006–2014) ==
Odegard first played on Team Canada at the 2006 Pan American Championships in Guatemala City, Guatemala, where he won gold in Men's Singles. He defeated John Ellis of the US in the semi-finals, 15–12, 15–12, and then Ellis's team-mate Woody Clouse, 9–15, 15–14, 11–9, in the final. As a result of the win, Odegard was named SaskSport's Athlete of the month for April 2006.

At the 2006 Canadian Championships in Edmonton, Odegard lost to Kane Waselenchuk in the Men's Singles semi-finals, 15–7, 15–4, but defeated Tim Landeryou in the 3rd place match, 15–12, 15–14. In Men's Doubles, Odegard and Francis Guillemette lost to Vincent Gagnon and François Viens in the semi-finals of Men's Doubles, 18–16, 11–15, 11–8, but won the 3rd place match against Kelly Kerr and Ken St. Laurent, 15–8, 15–10.

Odegard went to the World Championships for the first time in 2006 in Santo Dominigo, Dominican Republic, where he played Men's Singles. He came into the event as the Pan Am Champion, but was upset in the Round of 16 by Simon Perdomo of the Dominican Republic. However, he helped Canada to the final in the Men's Team event, although they lost to the USA.

Odegard and Francis Guillemette finished 3rd in the 2007 National Team Doubles Selection Event in Victoria, British Columbia, losing to Mike Green and Brian Istace in the final four playoff, 15–7, 15–13, and to Vincent Gagnon and François Viens, 15–10, 15–10, but beating James Landeryou and Tim Landeryou, 15–11, 15–3. At the Singles Selection Event in Brossard, Québec, Odegard finished 3rd, as he defeated Viens, 15–3, 1–15, 11–7, in the final four playoff round, but lost to Green and Gagnon.

Odegard almost repeated as Pan American Champion, as he reached the final in 2007, but he lost to Mexican Álvaro Beltrán, 15–6, 15–8.

Odegard won Men's Singles at the 2007 Canadian Championships in Regina, Saskatchewan, despite being seeded 7th. He upset 2nd seed Corey Osborne in the quarterfinals, 3rd seed Vincent Gagnon in the semi-finals, and top seed Mike Green in the final to win his 1st Canadian title. The final went to a tie-breaker after Green won game one and Odegard game two. With the momentum of winning game two on his side, Odegard took a 7–0 lead in the breaker, only to see defending champion Green come back with ten straight points to reach match point at 10–7.

Odegard saved that match point with a winning serve return, and then tied the game 10-10. He won it on his 3rd match point opportunity, with a final score of 11–15, 15–8, 12–10.

Also in Regina, Odegard played Men's Doubles with Francis Guillemette and they lost in the semi-finals to Vincent Gagnon and François Viens, 16–14, 15–8, and lost the 3rd place match to James Landeryou and Tim Landeryou.

At the National Team Doubles Selection Event in Windsor, Ontario in the 2007–08 season, Odegard and Francis Guillemette finished 3rd in the final four playoff, as they lost to Vincent Gagnon and François Viens and Mike Green and Brian Istace, but defeated James Landeryou and Tim Landeryou, 15–4, 8–15, 11–9. In the Singles Selection Event in Winnipeg, Odegard finished 2nd behind Green.

Odegard played Men's Singles at the Pan American Championships for a 3rd consecutive year in 2008, and once again he reached the podium. The championships were in San José, Costa Rica that year, where Odegard defeated Fernando Rios of Ecuador in the Round of 16, 15–13, 5–15, 11–5, Fabian Balmori in the quarterfinals, 15–8, 15–8, but lost to Mexican Álvaro Beltrán, 14–15, 15–8, 11–3, in the semi-finals, so Odegard left San José with a bronze medal.

Odegard went to the 2008 Canadian Championships in Burlington, Ontario as the defending Men's Singles champion, but he lost in the semi-finals to Vincent Gagnon, 15–11, 7–15, 11–6. However, he did defeat Michael Burgess in the 3rd place match, 15–10, 15–4. His fate was similar in Men's Doubles that year, as he and Francis Guillemette lost to Gagnon and François Viens in the semi-finals, 15–10, 3–11, 11–3, and then dropped the 3rd place match to James Landeryou and Tim Landeryou, 8–15, 15–12, 13–11.

Odegard played doubles at an international event for the first time in 2008, when he partnered with François Viens in Men's Doubles at the 2008 World Championships in Kingscourt, Ireland, where they lost in the quarterfinals to the Japanese pair of Michimune Kono and Hiroshi Shimizu, 2–15, 15–7, 11–6. However, Odegard did help Canada get on the podium in the Men's Team event, as they defeated Costa Rica in the quarterfinals but lost to Mexico in the semi-finals, resulting in a bronze medal.

In the 2008–09 season, Odegard played with Ryan Smith at the National Team Doubles Selection Event in Burnaby, British Columbia, but they lost in the quarterfinals to Francis Guillemette and Corey Osborne, 13–15, 15–11, 11–5, so didn't qualify for the final four playoff, and ended up finishing 5th. However, Odegard won the National Team Singles Selection Event in Brossard, Québec in February 2009, defeating Michael Burgess, Vincent Gagnon and Ryan Smith in the final four playoff round.

At the 2009 Pan American Championships in Cali, Colombia, Odegard played Men's Singles and reached the podium for the fourth straight year with bronze medal. He defeated the USA's Chris Crowther in the quarterfinals, 15–9, 9–15, 11–4, but lost to Mexican Leopoldo Gutierrez, 15–12, 13–15, 11–3, in the semi-finals.

Odegard won his 2nd Canadian Championship in Men's Singles at the 2009 Canadian Championships in Edmonton, where he squeaked out a win over Tim Landeryou in the quarterfinals, 13–15, 15–12, 14–12, then got an injury forfeit win in the semi-finals over former doubles partner Francis Guillemette, which put him in the final against top seed Mike Green. He pulled out the victory in two close games, 16–14, 17–15. In Men's Doubles, Odegard and Ryan Smith lost in the semi-finals to Green and Eric Desrochers, 15–3, 13–15, 11–7, and defaulted the 3rd place match to James Landeryou and Tim Landeryou due to injury.

Odegard played at the US Open Racquetball Championships many times, but never went further in the International Racquetball Tour draw than the Round of 16. However, his highlight US Open win happened in November 2009, when he defeated 2 time US Open champion Cliff Swain in the Round of 32, 11–5, 9–11, 11–2, 11–5. That set up a showdown with Jason Mannino in the 16s, which Mannino won, 11–7, 11–2, 11–7.

Odegard won the first National Team Selection Event of 2009–10 in Regina, Saskatchewan, where he beat Lee Connell and Corey Osborne prior to squeaking out a tie-breaker win over Mike Green, 10–15, 15–7, 15–13, in the final four playoff.

That win coupled with his 2nd Canadian Championship helped make Odegard the #1 men's player in Canada on December 10, 2009. He remained #1 until June 22, 2010.

Odegard came 2nd at the second National Team Selection Event of 2009–10 in Brossard, Québec, as he only lost to Vincent Gagnon, 12–15, 15–10, 11–9, in the final four playoff round and had wins over Mike Green and Tim Landeryou.

Odegard won a fifth medal in Men's Singles in as many years at the 2010 Pan American Championships in San Pedro Sula, Honduras, where he defeated Ivan Villegas of Costa Rica in the quarterfinals, 15–6, 9–15, 11–7, but lost to Mexican Leopoldo Gutierrez, 15–3, 15–5, in the semi-finals.

At the 2010 Canadian Championships in Burnaby, British Columbia, Odegard won Men's Doubles for the first time, as he partnered with Mike Green, and the defeated Vincent Gagnon and François Viens in the final, 14–16, 15–10, 11–7. They reached the final with a semi-final win over James Landeryou and Tim Landeryou, 15–7, 15–8. In Men's Singles, Odegard was the top seed and defending Men's Singles Champion, but he was upset in the semi-finals by Tim Landeryou, 12–15, 15–5, 11–6, and ended up 4th, as he lost the 3rd place match to Gagnon, 15–10, 15–1.

Odegard played Men's Singles at the 2010 World Championships in Seoul, South Korea, where he lost to Bolivian Ricardo Monroy in the Round of 16, 15–9, 15–0. But Odegard did get on the podium in the Men's Team event, as Canada defeated Ecuador in the quarterfinals and Costa Rica in the semi-finals. However, they lost to the US in the final.

In 2010, Odegard made the Men's Open final at the US Open Racquetball Championships where he faced fellow Canadian Vincent Gagnon, who defeated Odegard in a tie-breaker, 4–15, 15–9, 11–7.

Odegard was upset in the Round of 16 at the first National Team Selection Event of 2010–11 in Edmonton, where Barret Husulak defeated him, 15–12, 16-14 and finished 9th. In the second Selection Event in Brossard, Québec, Odegard was 4th, as he lost to Mike Green, 15–10, 16–14, in the semi-finals, and then lost the 3rd place match to Tim Landeryou, 8–15, 15–12, 13–11.

In the 2011 Pan American Championships in Managua, Nicaragua, Odegard played doubles with Mike Green. They defeated César Castillo and César Castro of Venezuela, 15–11, 15–12, in the quarterfinals, but lost to the USA's Jansen Allen and Tony Carson, 7–15, 15–13, 11–7, in the semi-finals, so they were bronze medalists. This would prove to be Odegard's last appearance at the Pan Am Championships, and he reached the podium in each of the six years he competed at Pan Ams.

At the 2011 Canadian Championships in Nova Scotia, Odegard came 3rd in Men's Singles, losing to Vincent Gagnon, 17–15, 15–1, in the semi-finals, but beating Tim Landeryou the 3rd place match, 15–8, 15–4. In doubles, Odegard and Mike Green successfully defended their title in Men's Doubles, as they beat Gagnon and François Viens, 15–9, 15–6, in the final after defeating James Landeryou and Tim Landeryou, 15–12, 15–13, in the semi-finals.

In 2011, Odegard played at the Pan American Games in Guadalajara, Mexico, where he teamed with Tim Landeryou in Men's doubles. They defeated Bolivians Roland Keller and Ricardo Monroy in the quarterfinals, but lost a tight semi-final match to Venezuelans César Castro and Jorge Hirsekorn, 15–14, 3–15, 11–10, making Odegard a bronze medalist. In the Men's Team event, Canada lost in the quarterfinals to Ecuador, as Odegard and Mike Green lost a tie-breaker against Jose Alvarez and Fernando Rios.

In the 2011–12 National Team Selection Events, Odegard finished 3rd in the first event in Oakville, Ontario, losing the final to Vincent Gagnon, 14–16, 13–15, 11–2, in the semi-finals, but winning the 3rd place match versus Tim Landeryou, 15–4, 15–6. He reached the final of the second National Team Selection Event in Regina, Saskatchewan, where he lost to Gagnon in the final, 15–11, 10–15, 11–8. He defeated Tim Landeryou in the semi-finals, 15–11, 15–7.

In 2012 in Brossard, Québec, Odegard and Mike Green came into the Canadian Championships as the two-time defending champions in Men's Doubles. However, they were upset in the semi-finals by Pedro Castro and Eric Desrochers, 15–11, 1–15, 11–9. In singles that year, Odegard lost to Vincent Gagnon, 15–8, 7–15, 11–3, in the semi-finals.

Odegard was part of Team Canada for the 2012 World Championships. In Men's Singles, he defeated Fernando Rios of Ecuador in the Round of 16, but lost to Mexican Gilberto Mejia, 15–4, 15–8, in the quarterfinals. However, in the Men's Team event, Odegard helped to the silver medal as they beat Ecuador in the quarterfinals and Mexico in the semi-finals – helped by Odegard's win in a re-match with Mejia, 15–11, 15-6 – before losing to the US in the final, where Odegard dropped a close match versus Jose Rojas, 15–14, 15–10.

That would prove to be Odegard's last competition, as he retired prior to the start of the 2012–13 season. He made the podium in his last international competition, just as he had in his first.

== Career summary ==
Odegard won two Canadian Men's Singles Championships – 2007 and 2009 – and two Canadian Men's Doubles Championships – 2010 and 2011, both with Mike Green.

Internationally, Odegard competed for Canada eleven times, winning several medals, including one at every Pan American Racquetball Championships that he competed at, highlighted by gold in 2006, which was his first time on Team Canada. Odegard also medalled in his last Team Canada appearance at the 2012 World Championships.

Odegard did not play a lot on the International Racquetball Tour (IRT) over his career. But there were four seasons when he played more than half of the IRT events. The first was early in his career, when he played 8 of the 13 events in 2000–01, reaching the Round of 16 twice, and finished ranked 27th. The other three seasons were consecutive starting in 2007–08, when he made the 16s six times in nine events (ranked 15th). Odegard was in the Round of 16 five times then next year (ranked 17th), and seven times in 2008–09, which ranked him a career high 12th at season's end. Odegard never made it past the Round of 16 on the IRT.

=== Career record ===
This table lists Odegard's results across annual events.

| Event | 2000 | 2001 | 2002 | 2003 | 2004 | 2005 | 2006 | 2007 | 2008 | 2009 | 2010 | 2011 | 2012 |
| National Team Selection Event #1 | | F * | 6th * | QF * | 3rd * | F * | F * | 3rd * | 3rd * | 5th * | W | 9th | 3rd |
| National Team Selection Event #2 | | | QF | QF | 10th | 16 | 4th | 3rd | F | W | F | 4th | F |
| Racquetball Canada National Doubles | 4th | 6th | QF | QF | F | 4th | 3rd | 4th | 4th | 4th | W | W | 4th |
| Racquetball Canada National Singles | | | 16 | 16 | 6th | F | 3rd | W | 3rd | W | 4th | 3rd | 4th |

Note: W = winner, F = finalist, SF = semi-finalist, QF = quarterfinalist, 16 = Round of 16, 32 = Round of 32. The years refer to the year the event occurred, except for National Team Selection Event #1, which sometimes occurred at the end of the previous year. That is, Selection Event #1 and #2 have occurred in different calendar years, as the racquetball season goes from September to May/June with the first Selection Event happening earlier in the season than the second. Also, an * indicates the first selection event was a doubles event.

== Personal life ==
Odegard's sister, Karina also played racquetball, including on Team Canada. The siblings won two junior worlds mixed doubles title in 1998 and 1999.

After retiring, Odegard pursued a degree in law, graduating from Thomas Jefferson School of Law with an LLB and then got a master's degree in tax law at Georgetown. He currently works as a tax lawyer in Seattle. Previously, Odegard obtained a degree in education from the University of Saskatchewan and worked as a math teacher in Saskatoon.

In 2018, Odegard was inducted into the Saskatoon Sports Hall of Fame, and in 2019, he was inducted into Racquetball Canada's Hall of Fame.

== See also ==
- List of racquetball players
