= Andy Hawthorne (racquetball) =

American racquetball player

Personal information
- Nationality: American
- Born: September 7, 1982 (age 43) Clinton, Iowa
- Height: 5 ft 10 in (178 cm)
- Weight: 150 lb (68 kg)

Sport
- Sport: Racquetball
- College team: Baldwin-Wallace College
- Turned pro: 2004

Achievements and titles
- Highest world ranking: No. 6
Medal record
Silver medal – second place	2007 Pan American Championships	Doubles
Bronze medal – third place	2009 Pan American Championships	Singles

Andy Hawthorne is a professional racquetball player (born September 7, 1982). Hawthorne finished #6 on the International Racquetball Tour (IRT) at the end of the 2010–11 season, a career high and the fourth season he'd finished in the IRT's top 10 players. Primarily a drive serving player, Hawthorne also has a very "scrappy" game style.

== Professional career ==
Hawthorne began playing the IRT full-time in the 2004–05 season, when he played 9 of the 12 events and reached the quarter-finals twice. Since then Hawthorne hasn't missed a tournament, reaching the quarter-finals 28 times but only once advancing to the semi-finals, which was at the Kansas City Pro-Am in September 2011, when he lost to Kane Waselenchuk in three games.

== International career ==
Hawthorne has been on Team USA at three international events. He and Jason Samora were silver medalists in doubles at the 2007 Pan American Championships in Chile, losing to Canadians Vincent Gagnon and François Viens in the final.

In his other Team USA appearances, Hawthorne was a bronze medalist in singles at the 2009 Pan American Championships, and in 2011, he lost to Bolivian Carlos Keller in the Round of 16.

== USA Racquetball competitions ==
Hawthorne won the USA Racquetball collegiate men's doubles title in 2002 and 2003 with Shane Vanderson, when he represented Baldwin-Wallace College. In 2002, Hawthorne also won the collegiate mixed title with Krystal Csuk.

== Personal ==
Born in Clinton, Iowa, Hawthorne grew up in Champaign, Illinois, close to a racquetball club. He learned to play from his uncle on a family vacation, and then continued to play when he returned home.

Hawthorne is married, and met his wife Tracy at Baldwin-Wallace College as he was looking to recruit women for the racquetball team there. She continues to play racquetball competitively.

Hawthorne has been sponsored by Ektelon throughout his career.

== See also ==
- List of racquetball players
- IRT Website
