= François Viens =

Canadian racquetball player (born 1975)

Personal information
- Nationality: Canadian
- Born: March 7, 1975 (age 51) Ottawa, Ontario

Sport
- Sport: Racquetball

Achievements and titles
- National finals: 1st Doubles 2003, 2007, 2009, 2012
Medal record
Men's Racquetball
Representing Canada
World Championships
Silver medal – second place	2006 Santo Domingo	Team
Pan American Games
Bronze medal – third place	2003 Santo Domingo	Doubles
Pan Am Championships
Gold medal – first place	2007 Santiago	Doubles
Bronze medal – third place	2004 Cuenca	Doubles

François Viens (born March 7, 1975) is a retired Canadian racquetball player from Delson, Quebec. Viens was a doubles specialist during his career usually playing on the right side. He won four Canadian Championships in doubles, one with Corey Osborne, and three with Vincent Gagnon, with whom he also won the 2007 Pan American Championships.

== Junior years ==
At Junior Nationals in 1990 in Regina, Viens won both Boys' U14 Singles and Doubles with Kane Waselenchuk - even though Waselenchuk was 8 at the time. He would go on to win Boys' Singles U16 in 1992 and U18 in 1994, and another Boys' Doubles title in 1993 with Kelly Kerr for five Canadian Junior Championships overall.

== Senior career ==
Viens won his first Canadian Championship in Men's Doubles in 2003 with Corey Osborne. That victory helped them get selected for the 2003 Pan American Games in Santo Domingo, Dominican Republic.

That event was Viens's first appearance on Team Canada, and he and Osborne came away from Santo Domingo with bronze medals, after losing in the semi-finals to Mexicans Alvaro Beltran and Javier Moreno. They defeated Bolivia in the quarterfinals, 15-7, 15-7, which Viens said was the tournament highlight for him.

Viens played doubles with Tom O'Brien at the 2004 Pan American Championships, and they earned bronze medals, losing in the semi-finals to Americans Mike Dennison and Shane Vanderson, 15-8, 15-14.

Viens and Corey Osborne tried to defend their Men's Doubles title at the 2004 Canadian Championships, but lost in the semi-finals to Brian Istace and Kris Odegard, 9-15, 15-2, 11-6.

Viens first played doubles with Vincent Gagnon at the 2004 National Team Doubles Selection Event in Calgary, where they finished third.

Viens and Gagnon lost in the final at the 2005 Canadian Championships to Mike Green and Brian Istace, 15-6, 15-5, after defeating Kris Odegard and Ryan Powell in the semi-finals.

At the 2006 World Championships Viens played singles, which was the only time he did that on Team Canada. He defeated Japan's Akio Shimizu in the Round of 16, 15-3, 15-4, but lost to Mexican Gilberto Mejia in the quarter-finals, 15-1, 15-6. In the team competition, Viens helped Canada to a silver medal finish, losing to the USA in the final.

Viens's greatest success internationally was winning the 2007 Pan American Championships in Santiago, Chile, where he and Vincent Gagnon defeated Americans Andy Hawthorne and Jason Samora in the final, 15-6, 11-15, 11-9. In the semi-finals, they beat Mexicans Polo Gutierrez and Javier Moreno.

Viens and Vincent Gagnon lost in the final of the 2007 Canadian National Championship to Mike Green and Brian Istace, 15-10, 15-4, and it was their third loss in as many years to Green and Istace in the final at the Canadian Championships.

At the 2008 Canadian Championships, Viens and Vincent Gagnon won the Men's Doubles title by defeating the team they'd lost to three finals in row: Mike Green and Brian Istace, 15-13, 6-15, 11-6. To reach the final, they defeated Francis Guillemette and Kris Odegard, 15-10, 3-15, 11-3.

That victory helped Viens get selected for Team Canada at the 2008 World Championships in Kingscourt, Ireland, where he played doubles with Kris Odegard. They lost to Japan's team of Hiroshi Shimizu and Michimune Kono in the quarter-finals, 2-15, 15-7, 11-6. That was Viens's last appearance with Team Canada.

Viens and Gagnon won two more Canadian doubles titles. They successfully defended their title at the 2009 Canadian Championships in Edmonton, where they defeated Mike Green and Eric Desrochers in the final, 15-9, 15-9. Then in 2012, Viens and Gagnon defeated Desrochers and Pedro Castro in the final, 15-8, 8-15, 11-9.

== Career summary ==
Viens made five appearances on Team Canada, and won four Canadian Championships, all in doubles.

== Personal ==
Viens is married and lives in Delson, Quebec.

== See also ==
- List of racquetball players
