= Racquetball at the 2003 Pan American Games =

This page shows the results of the Racquetball Competition for men and women at the 2003 Pan American Games, held from August 1 to August 17, 2003 in Santo Domingo, Dominican Republic.

== Men's competition ==
=== Singles ===
| RANK | NAME |
|---|---|
| Gold medal | Jack Huczek (USA) |
| Silver medal | Mike Green (CAN) |
| Bronze medal | Rocky Carson (USA) |
| Bronze medal | Gilberto Mejia (MEX) |

=== Doubles ===
| RANK | NAME |
|---|---|
| Gold medal | Mexico; Alvaro Beltrán; Javier Moreno |
| Silver medal | United States; Rubén González; Mike Guidry |
| Bronze medal | Argentina; Daniel Maggi; Shai Manzuri |
| Bronze medal | Canada; Corey Osborne; François Viens |

== Women's competition ==
=== Singles ===
| RANK | NAME |
|---|---|
| Gold medal | Cheryl Gudinas (USA) |
| Silver medal | Laura Fenton (USA) |
| Bronze medal | Angela Grisar (CHI) |
| Bronze medal | Lori-Jane Powell (CAN) |

=== Doubles ===
| RANK | NAME |
|---|---|
| Gold medal | Mexico; Susana Acosta; Rosa Torres |
| Silver medal | United States; Jackie Rice; Kim Russell |
| Bronze medal | Bolivia; Paola Núñez; Caroli Santos |
| Bronze medal | Canada; Josée Grand'Maître; Julie Neubauer |

== Medal table ==
| Place | Nation | Gold medal | Silver medal | Bronze medal | Total |
|---|---|---|---|---|---|
| 1 | United States | 2 | 3 | 1 | 6 |
| 2 | Mexico | 2 | 0 | 1 | 3 |
| 3 | Canada | 0 | 1 | 3 | 4 |
| 4 | Argentina | 0 | 0 | 1 | 1 |
| 4 | Bolivia | 0 | 0 | 1 | 1 |
| 4 | Chile | 0 | 0 | 1 | 1 |
| Total | | 4 | 4 | 8 | 16 |
