= Corey Osborne =

Canadian racquetball player

Personal information
- Nationality: Canadian
- Born: July 28, 1969 (age 56)

Sport
- Sport: Racquetball

Achievements and titles
- National finals: 1st Singles 2005, 1st Doubles 2003
Medal record
Men's Racquetball
Representing Canada
Pan American Games
Bronze medal – third place	2003 Pan Am Games	Doubles
Pan Am Championships
Silver medal – second place	2004 Pan American Championships	Singles
Bronze medal – third place	2003 Pan American Championships	Doubles

Corey Osborne (born July 28, 1969) is a Canadian racquetball player from Penetanguishene, Ontario. Osborne is a former Canadian Champion in singles in 2005 and doubles (with François Viens in 2003).

== International career ==
Osborne has made 4 appearances on Team Canada, and reached the podium on 3 of those occasions including at the 2003 Pan Am Games, when he earned a bronze medal in doubles with partner François Viens.

Osborne has played singles for Canada twice and medalled each time. He earned a silver medal at the 2004 Pan American Championships in Cuenca, Ecuador, where he lost the final to fellow Canadian Brian Istace, 15-13, 11-15, 11-7, and a bronze medal at the 2005 Pan American Championships in Caracas, Venezuela, where he lost to American Jack Huczek in the semi-finals, 15-1, 15-6.

Osborne's first appearance for Canada was at the 2003 Pan American Championships in Santo Dominigo, Dominican Republic, when he played doubles with Tom O'Brien. They lost to Bolivians Ricardo Monroy and Santiago Canedo in the quarter-finals.

== Canadian career ==
Osborne won the 2005 Canadian National Championship in singles. He also National Champion in doubles in 2003 with partner François Viens, and Osborne also finished 2nd in singles that year, losing to Mike Green, in a tie-breaker 15-3, 11-15, 11-5.

At the 2011 Canadian National Championships, Osborne was runner up in doubles with Francis Guillemette, as they lost the final to Green and Kris Odegard, 15-9, 15-6.

== Personal ==
Osborne is married and has one son, Kaleb, who also plays racquetball.

In 2008, Osborne was selected for the Midland Sports Hall of Fame in Midland, Ontario.

== See also ==
- List of racquetball players
