= Pan American Racquetball Championships =

The Pan American Racquetball Championships are held annually in the spring with play ending on the day before Easter. Originally called the Tournament of the Americas, the Pan American Championships are hosted by the Pan American Racquetball Confederation.

The 2026 Pan American Championships were held in Guatemala City, Guatemala, March 28 to April 4, 2026. Bolivian Conrrado Moscoso won men's singles, and Argentina's Maria Jose Vargas won women's singles. Mexicans Javier Mar and Rodrigo Montoya won men's doubles while Vargas and Valeria Centellas won women's doubles, and Costa Ricans Andrés Acuña and Larrisa Faeth won mixed doubles. The 2026 championships also had a team event, which was won by Mexico on the men's side and Argentina on the women's side.

The 2022 Pan American Championships were the first to use rally scoring, which was adopted by the International Racquetball Federation in early 2022. Also, mixed doubles and men's and Women's Team competitions were implemented for the first time. In the team competitions, countries compete head-to-head over three matches: two singles matches and a doubles match. Argentina and Bolivia were the first team champions: Argentina winning the women's team competition and Bolivia the men's team competition. Mexicans Rodrigo Montoya and Samantha Salas were the first mixed doubles Pan American Champions.

The 2022 competition was the first in three years, as the COVID-19 pandemic caused the cancellation of the 2020 and 2021 tournaments. The competition was not held in two years previously. In 1995, the Pan Am Games were held in the spring, so that year's Tournament of the Americas (as the competition was then known) was not held. In 2000, the competition was cancelled due to the civil unrest in Bolivia, which was to host the event.

== Champions ==
=== Champions by event and year ===
Year	Site	Men's singles	Women's singles	Men's doubles	Women's doubles	Mixed doubles
2026	Guatemala City	(Bolivia) Conrrado Moscoso	(Argentina) Maria Jose Vargas	(Mexico) Rodrigo Montoya & Javier Mar	(Argentina) Valeria Centellas & Maria Jose Vargas	(Costa Rica) Andrés Acuña & Larrisa Faeth
2025	Guatemala City	(Argentina) Diego García	(Mexico) Montserrat Mejia	(Bolivia) Kadim Carrasco & Conrrado Moscoso	(Argentina) Valeria Centellas & Natalia Mendez	(Chile) Carla Muñoz & Alan Natera
2024	Guatemala City	(Mexico) Rodrigo Montoya	(Argentina) Maria Jose Vargas	(Costa Rica) Andrés Acuña & Gabriel Garcia	(Argentina) Natalia Mendez & Maria Jose Vargas	(United States) Sam Bredenbeck & Michelle Key
2023	Guatemala City	(Bolivia) Conrrado Moscoso	(Mexico) Montserrat Mejia	(Mexico) Rodrigo Montoya & Eduardo Portillo	(Mexico) Alexandra Herrera & Montserrat Mejia	(Bolivia) Angélica Barrios & Conrrado Moscoso
2022	(Bolivia) Santa Cruz	(Bolivia) Conrrado Moscoso	(Bolivia) Angélica Barrios	(Canada) Coby Iwaasa & Samuel Murray	(Argentina) Natalia Mendez & María José Vargas	(Mexico) Rodrigo Montoya & Samantha Salas
2021	Not held – COVID-19					
2020	Not held – COVID-19					
2019	(Colombia) Barranquilla	(Bolivia) Carlos Keller	(Mexico) Paola Longoria	(Bolivia) Roland Keller & Conrrado Moscoso	(Mexico) Paola Longoria & Samantha Salas	
2018	(Chile) Temuco	(Bolivia) Carlos Keller	(United States) Rhonda Rajsich	(Mexico) Álvaro Beltrán & Rodrigo Montoya	(Mexico) Alexandra Herrera & Paola Longoria	
2017	(Costa Rica) San Jose	(Mexico) Alejandro Landa	(United States) Rhonda Rajsich	(Mexico) Polo Gutierrez & Alejandro Landa	(Mexico) Paola Longoria & Samantha Salas	
2016	(Mexico) San Luis Potosí	(Mexico) Daniel de la Rosa	(Mexico) Paola Longoria	(Mexico) Javier Moreno & Alejandro Landa	(Mexico) Paola Longoria & Samantha Salas	
2015	(Dominican Republic) Santo Domingo	(United States) José Díaz	(Mexico) Paola Longoria	(Mexico) Álvaro Beltrán & Javier Moreno	(Mexico) Paola Longoria & Samantha Salas	
2014	(Bolivia) Santa Cruz	(United States) Jose Rojas	(Argentina) María José Vargas	(Mexico) Daniel de la Rosa & Edson Martinez	(Mexico) Susana Acosta & Samantha Salas	
2013	(Colombia) Cali	(Mexico) Polo Gutierrez	(Mexico) Paola Longoria	(Mexico) Javier Moreno & Polo Gutierrez	(United States) Sharon Jackson & Rhonda Rajsich	
2012	(Chile) Temuco	(Canada) Mike Green	(Mexico) Paola Longoria	(Bolivia) Roland Keller & Ricardo Monroy	(Mexico) Paola Longoria & Samantha Salas	
2011	(Nicaragua) Managua	(Mexico) Daniel de la Rosa	(United States) Rhonda Rajsich	(Mexico) Javier Moreno & Polo Gutierrez	(Mexico) Paola Longoria & Samantha Salas	
2010	(Honduras) San Pedro Sula	(Bolivia) Ricardo Monroy	(Mexico) Paola Longoria	(Canada) Mike Green & Tim Landeryou	(Mexico) Susana Acosta & Samantha Salas	
2009	(Colombia) Cali	(Mexico) Álvaro Beltrán	(United States) Cheryl Gudinas Holmes	(United States) Ben Croft & Mitch Williams	(United States) Aimee Ruiz & Jackie Paraiso	
2008	(Costa Rica) San Jose	(Mexico) Álvaro Beltrán	(Mexico) Paola Longoria	(Mexico) Javier Moreno & Gilberto Mejia	(United States) Aimee Ruiz & Jackie Paraiso	
2007	(Chile) Santiago	(Mexico) Álvaro Beltrán	(United States) Rhonda Rajsich	(Canada) Vincent Gagnon & François Viens	(United States) Janel Tisinger & Rhonda Rajsich	
2006	Guatemala City	(Canada) Kris Odegard	(Mexico) Paola Longoria	(United States) Woody Clouse & Willie Tilton	(United States) Aimee Ruiz & Jackie Paraiso	
2005	(Venezuela) Caracas	(United States) Jack Huczek	(United States) Kristen Walsh	(United States) Mike Guidry & Jason Thoerner	(Mexico) Susana Acosta & Rosy Torres	
2004	(Ecuador) Cuenca	(Canada) Brian Istace	(Canada) Lori-Jane Powell	(Mexico) Carlos Bacmeister & Abraham Pena	(Mexico) Susana Acosta & Rosy Torres	
2003	(Dominican Republic) Santo Domingo	(United States) Jack Huczek	(United States) Laura Fenton	(United States) Ruben Gonzalez & Mike Guidry	(United States) Jackie Paraiso & Kim Russell	
2002	(Bolivia) Cochabamba	(Canada) Kane Waselenchuk	(United States) Laura Fenton	(United States) Ruben Gonzalez & Mike Guidry	(Canada) Lori-Jane Powell & Karina Odegard	
2001	(Honduras) San Pedro Sula	(United States) Rocky Carson	(United States) Cheryl Gudinas Holmes	(United States) Doug Eagle & Adam Karp	(United States) Laura Fenton & Jackie Paraiso	
2000	(Bolivia)	None	None	None	None	
1999	(Mexico) Rosarito	(Canada) Mike Green	(United States) Robin Levine	(United States) Doug Ganim & Drew Kachtik	(United States) Joy MacKenzie & Jackie Paraiso	
1998	(Canada) Winnipeg	(Canada) Sherman Greenfeld	(United States) Michelle Gould	(United States) Adam Karp & Bill Sell	(United States) Joy MacKenzie & Jackie Paraiso	
1997	(Mexico) Chihuahua	(United States) Eric Muller	(United States) Cheryl Gudinas Holmes	(United States) Todd O'Neil & Derek Robinson	(United States) Joy MacKenzie & Jackie Paraiso	
1996	(Colombia) Cali	(United States) Brian Rankin	(United States) Tammy Brockbank	(United States) Adam Karp & Bill Sell	(United States) Cheryl Gudinas Holmes & Michelle Gould	
1995	None	None	None	None	None	
1994	(Argentina) Buenos Aires	(Canada) Sherman Greenfeld	(United States) Cheryl Gudinas Holmes	(United States) Jeff Evans & Todd O'Neil	(United States) Michelle Gould & Robin Levine	
1993	(Bolivia) Cochabamba	(United States) Chris Cole	(United States) Jackie Paraiso	(United States) Joel Bonnett & Bill Sell	(United States) Mary Lyons & Susan Morgan-Pfahler	
1992	(Honduras) Tegucigalpa	(United States) Chris Cole	(United States) Lynne Coburn	(Canada) Mike Ceresia & Roger Harripersad	(United States) Robin Levine & Kim Russell	
1991	(Chile) Santiago	(United States) Tim Doyle	(United States) Michelle Gould	(United States) Jim Floyd & Tim Hansen	(United States) Jackie Paraiso & Kim Russell	
1990	(United States) Jacksonville	(Canada) Sherman Greenfeld	(United States) Michelle Gould	(United States) Doug Ganim & Dan Obremski	(United States) Malia Kamahoahoa Bailey & Toni Bevelock	
1989	(Costa Rica) San Jose	(United States) Andy Roberts	(United States) Malia Kamahoahoa Bailey	(United States) Brian Hawkes & Bill Sell		
1988	(Bolivia) Santa Cruz	(United States) Bill Sell	(United States) Michelle Gould	(United States) Bill Sell & David Simonette		
1987	(United States) Colorado Springs	(United States) Egan Inoue	(Canada) Heather Stupp	–	–	

=== Champions by country ===
Country	Men's singles	Women's singles	Men's doubles	Women's doubles	Mixed doubles	Total
United States	13	20	17	16	1	67
Mexico	8	10	9	13	1	41
Canada	8	2	4	1	0	15
Bolivia	6	1	3	0	1	11
Argentina	1	3	0	4	0	8
Chile	0	0	0	0	1	1
Costa Rica	0	0	0	0	1	1

=== Team Champions by year ===
Year	Men's Team	Women's Team
2026	Mexico	Argentina
2025	BOL	Mexico
2024	Mexico	Argentina
2022	Bolivia	Argentina

== Multiple champions ==
=== List of men's multiple champions ===
Champion	Singles Titles	Doubles Titles	Total
(Bolivia) Conrrado Moscoso	2	4	6
(Mexico) Rodrigo Montoya	1	4	5
(Mexico) Álvaro Beltrán	3	2	5
(United States) Bill Sell	1	4	5
(Mexico) Javier Moreno	0	5	5
(Mexico) Polo Gutierrez	1	3	4
(Canada) Sherman Greenfeld	3	0	3
(Canada) Mike Green	2	1	3
(Mexico) Daniel de la Rosa	2	1	3
(Mexico) Alejandro Landa	1	2	3
(United States) Adam Karp	0	3	3
(United States) Mike Guidry	0	3	3
(Costa Rica) Andrés Acuña	0	2	2
(Bolivia) Carlos Keller	2	0	2
(United States) Chris Cole	2	0	2
(United States) Ruben Gonzalez	0	2	2
(United States) Jack Huczek	2	0	2
(United States) Doug Ganim	0	2	2
(Bolivia) Ricardo Monroy	1	1	2
(United States) Todd O'Neil	0	2	2

=== List of women's multiple champions ===
Champion	Singles Titles	Doubles Titles	Total
(Mexico) Paola Longoria	8	7	15
(United States) Jackie Paraiso	1	9	10
(Mexico) Samantha Salas	0	9	9
(Argentina) María José Vargas	3	3	6
(United States) Rhonda Rajsich	4	2	6
(United States) Michelle Gould	4	2	6
(United States) Cheryl Gudinas Holmes	4	1	5
(Mexico) Susana Acosta	0	4	4
(Mexico) Montserrat Mejia	2	1	3
(United States) Laura Fenton	2	1	3
(United States) Aimee Ruiz	0	3	3
(United States) Robin Levine	1	2	3
(Argentina) Natalia Mendez	0	3	3
(United States) Kim Russell	0	3	3
(United States) Joy MacKenzie	0	3	3
(Argentina) Valeria Centellas	0	2	2
(Bolivia) Angélica Barrios	1	1	2
(Mexico) Alexandra Herrera	0	2	2
(Canada) Lori-Jane Powell	1	1	2
(United States) Malia Kamahoahoa Bailey	1	1	2
(Mexico) Rosy Torres	0	2	2
