= Mike Ceresia =

Canadian athlete

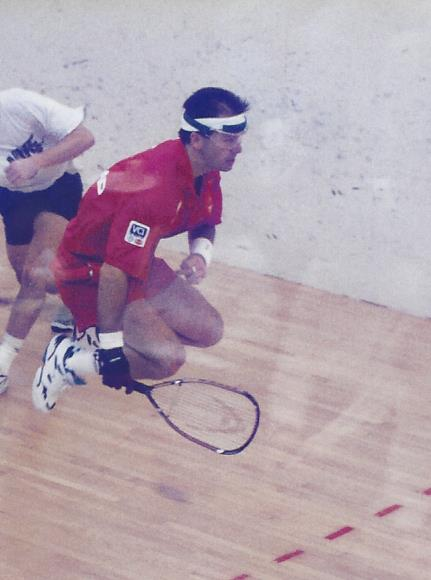

Personal information
- Full name: Mike Ceresia
- Nationality: Canadian
- Born: November 3, 1970 (age 55) Sarnia, Ontario

Sport
- Country: Canada
- Sport: Racquetball
- Retired: 2004

Achievements and titles
- National finals: 1st 1992, 1997 (singles) 1st 1988-89, 1993, 1995-97, 2000, 2002 (doubles)
Medal record
Men's Racquetball
Representing Canada
World Championships
Silver medal – second place	2002 World Championships	Doubles
Gold medal – first place	2002 World Championships	Men’s Team
Gold medal – first place	2000 World Championships	Men’s Team
Gold medal – first place	2000 World Championships	Overall Team
Silver medal – second place	1996 World Championships	Doubles
Gold medal – first place	1996 World Championships	Men’s Team
Silver medal – second place	1994 World Championships	Singles
Silver medal – second place	1990 World Championships	Doubles
Silver medal – second place	1988 World Championships	Doubles
Gold medal – first place	1988 World Championships	Men’s Team
Pan Am Championships
Silver medal – second place	1998 Pan Am Championships	Doubles
Silver medal – second place	1997 Pan Am Championships	Doubles
Gold medal – first place	1992 Pan Am Championships	Doubles
Bronze medal – third place	1991 Pan Am Championships	Doubles
Silver medal – second place	1990 Pan Am Championships	Doubles
Silver medal – second place	1989 Pan Am Championships	Doubles
Pan American Games
Silver medal – second place	1995 Mar del Plata	Men’s Team

Mike Ceresia is a Canadian retired racquetball player from Sarnia, Ontario. He won gold in the Men’s Team event at four International Racquetball Federation (IRF) World Championships, and one overall World Championship Title for a total of 5 Gold Medals. This is a Canadian record. In Canada, Ceresia won 10 Canadian Championships (two singles and eight doubles), and that is 3rd most men's titles (tied with Sherman Greenfeld).

== International career ==
Ceresia represented Canada on 18 occasions between 1988 and 2002, including eight consecutive World Championships during that period.

His lowest finish at the World Championships was fourth.

Ceresia was a member on the Canadian men's team that won gold four times: 1988, 1996, 2000 and 2002, as well as a gold medal for Overall/Combined Team in 2000. Ceresia and his partners won the deciding match for the men's team title in 1988, 2000 and 2002. These three clinching victories were over the United States.

Ceresia was the men's doubles silver medalist at Worlds on four occasions: in 1988 with Paul Shanks, in 1990 with Ross Harvey, in 1996 with Simon Roy, and in 2002 with Mike Green. Ceresia was also a World silver medallist in men's singles in 1994.

Ceresia was a Pan American Games silver medalist in the Men's Team event in Mar Del Plata, Argentina in 1995.

== Canadian career ==
Ceresia was the Canadian Champion in Men's Singles twice: in 1992 and in 1997. He was Canadian National Doubles Champion in Men's Doubles on eight occasions.

His first two doubles titles were back to back in 1988 with Roger Harripersad and 1989 with Paul Shanks. He next won in 1993 with Jacques Demers. Ceresia's most successful partnership was with Simon Roy. They won three consecutive championships, from 1995 to 1997. Ceresia won in 2000 with Mike Green and his final championship came in 2002 with Gary Waite.

His 10 Canadian Championships tie him for third most men's championships with Sherman Greenfeld.

== Personal life ==
Ceresia is a member of three sports halls of fame. He was inducted into the Sarnia-Lambton Sports Hall of Fame in 2008, Ceresia was inducted into the Racquetball Canada Hall of Fame in May 2018. In 2024, he was named to the Ontario Sports Hall of Fame.

Ceresia graduated from the University of Western Ontario in London, Ontario with a BA. Ceresia and his wife Claudine have two children and live in Burlington, Ontario.
