= Sherman Greenfeld =

Canadian racquetball player

Personal information
- Nationality: Canadian
- Born: June 3, 1962 (age 64) Winnipeg, Manitoba

Sport
- Sport: Racquetball
- College team: University of Manitoba
- Turned pro: 1980
- Retired: 1999
Medal record
Men's Racquetball
Representing Canada
World Championships
| Gold medal – first place | 1994 Mexico | Singles |
| Gold medal – first place | 1998 Bolivia | Singles |
Pan American Games
| Bronze medal – third place | 1995 Mar del Plata | Singles |
Pan Am Championships
| Gold medal – first place | 1990 Jacksonville | Singles |
| Gold medal – first place | 1994 Buenos Aires | Singles |
| Gold medal – first place | 1998 Winnipeg | Singles |
| Silver medal – second place | 1999 Rosarito | Singles |
World Games
| Bronze medal – third place | 1993 The Hague | Singles |

Sherman Greenfeld (born June 3, 1962) is a former Canadian professional racquetball player from Winnipeg, Manitoba. Greenfeld won two World Championships and 10 Canadian Championships, and was one of the top racquetball players in Canada during the 1980s and 1990s. Greenfeld retired from national competitions in 1999 following the Pan American Games in Winnipeg.

== Early life ==
Greenfeld was born in Winnipeg into a Jewish family.

== International career ==
Greenfeld won more international championships for Canada than any other player. He was the International Racquetball Federation World Champion in 1994 and 1998, and won the Pan American Racquetball Championships (then the Tournament of the Americas) three times, in 1990, 1994, and 1998.

Greenfeld was silver medalist at the 1999 Pan American Championships, his penultimate tournament for Canada, losing to fellow Canadian Mike Green in the final. Greenfeld also earned bronze medals in the 1995 Pan American Games and 1993 World Games.

Greenfeld's 18 appearances on Team Canada is tied for second most by a male player with Mike Ceresia. Greenfeld last played for Canada at the 1999 Pan American Games in his hometown of Winnipeg, where he finished fourth.

== Canadian career ==
Greenfeld won the Canadian Championship in 1986–1988, 1990 & 1991, 1993–1996 and then finally in 1998. He also reached the finals in 1985, 1997 when he lost to Mike Ceresia and 1999 when he lost to Kane Waselenchuk.

== Awards and honors ==
In 2001, Greenfeld was inducted into the Manitoba Sports Hall of Fame.

In 2000, Greenfeld was given the Ivan Velan Award, Racquetball Canada's highest honor.

In 2003, Racquetball Canada created the Sherman Greenfeld Award, which is presented annually at the Canadian Junior Racquetball Championships to a boy who exemplifies excellence on and off the court.

== Halls of Fame ==
Greenfeld was inducted into the Manitoba Sports Hall of Fame in 2002, and was elected to the International Jewish Sports Hall of Fame's induction class of 2015.
