= Mike Green (racquetball) =

Canadian racquetball player

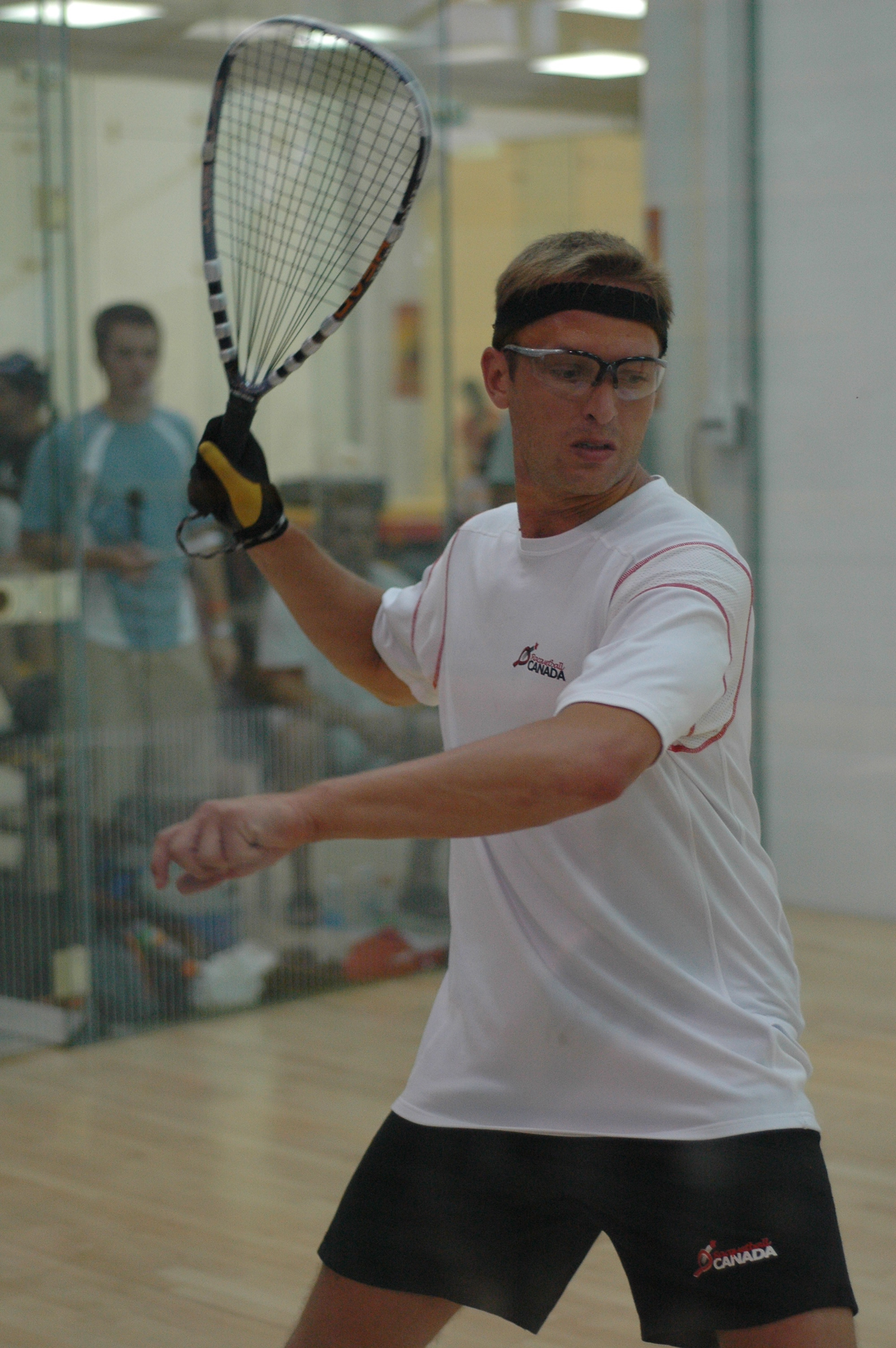
- Green at 2006 Worlds

Personal information
- Nationality: Canadian
- Born: August 22, 1973 (age 53) Burlington, Ontario

Sport
- Sport: Racquetball

Achievements and titles
- National finals: 1st Singles: 2002-04, 2006, 2008, 2010-13, 2016-2017; 1st Doubles: 2000, 2004-07, 2010-2011, 2013, 2015, 2017
- Highest world ranking: 6th
Medal record
World Championships
Bronze medal – third place	2002 San Juan	Doubles
Bronze medal – third place	2006 Santo Domingo	Doubles
Silver medal – second place	2010 Seoul	Doubles
Silver medal – second place	2012 Santo Domingo	Team
Silver medal – second place	2014 Burlington	Doubles
Pan American Games
Silver medal – second place	2003 Santo Domingo	Singles
Bronze medal – third place	2015 Toronto	Team
Pan Am Championships
Gold medal – first place	1999 Rosarito	Singles
Bronze medal – third place	2006 Guatemala City	Doubles
Bronze medal – third place	2007 Santiago	Singles
Gold medal – first place	2010 San Pedro Sula	Doubles
Bronze medal – third place	2011 Managua	Doubles
Gold medal – first place	2012 Temuco	Singles

Mike Green (born August 22, 1973) is a Canadian retired racquetball player from Burlington, Ontario. Green set the record for Men's Singles Canadian Championships at 11 in 2017, which broke a tie he had with Sherman Greenfeld. He also won 10 Men's Doubles Canadian Championships, and together those 21 Canadian titles are the most for a Canadian man.

== Professional career ==
Green's career high professional ranking was 8th at the end of the 2003-04 International Racquetball Tour (IRT) season. Green's ranking is the second highest ever by a Canadian player behind Samuel Murray and Kane Waselenchuk.

Green has reached the semi-finals of IRT Tier 1 or Grand Slam events seven times, and those all occurred over the four season period from 2000-01 to 2003-04, when he was playing most of the IRT tournaments. Since then he has only played a few tournaments each season and not gotten past the Round of 16.

== International career ==
Green has made 28 appearances on Team Canada beginning in 1996, and that's the most appearances by a Canadian men's player. He's won gold medals thrice: in singles at the 2012 and 1999 Pan American Racquetball Championships and in doubles with Tim Landeryou at the 2010 Pan American Championships. Green was also part of Team Canada that won the overall team title at the 2000 World Championships, which is the only time the USA has not won that title.

In addition, Green earned medals on eight other occasions. Most recently Green and Vincent Gagnon won silver at the 2014 World Championships, which was his second silver at Worlds as he and Landeryou won silver at the 2010 World Championships. Green also got silver at the 2003 Pan American Games in singles and at the 2002 World Championships in doubles with Mike Ceresia.

Green finished with bronze medals from the Pan American Racquetball Championships in doubles in 2006 with Brian Istace and in 2011 with Kris Odegard and in singles in 2007. Green also came home with bronze in doubles from both the 2002 World Championships (with Tom O'Brien) and 2006 World Championships (with Brian Istace).

Green also represented Canada at the 2009 World Games.

== Canadian career ==
Green has been Canadian Men's Singles Champion 11 times. His last title was in 2017, when he defeated Samuel Murray in Brossard, Québec, 12-15, 15-12, 12-10, in the final. Green also won Men's Doubles in 2017, as he partnered with Trevor Webb. They beat Nicolas Bousquet and Tommy Murray in the final, 10-15, 16-14, 13-11. In 2016, Green defeated Tim Landeryou 15-6, 15-8, in the final. His previous titles came in 2002, 2003, 2004, 2006, 2008, 2010, 2011, 2012, and 2013 - and Doubles Champion eight times - in 2000 with Mike Ceresia, 2004 with Tom O'Brien, 2005-2007 with Brian Istace and 2010 and 2011 with Kris Odegard, and 2013 with Coby Iwaasa. Green's 21 combined Canadian titles is second only to Jennifer Saunders's 24.

== Personal life ==
Green has a Bachelor of Commerce degree from McMaster University. He sells real estate in Hamilton.
