= 2026 Racquetball World Championships =

Racquetball competition in Chile

- XXIII Racquetball World Championships: 2026 -
| Host | (Chile) Temuco |
| Dates | October 17–24, 2026 |
- Men's singles
| Gold | (Bolivia) Conrrado Moscoso |
| Silver | (United States) Jake Bredenbeck |
| Bronze | (Canada) Trevor Webb (Mexico) Eduardo Portillo |
- Women's singles
| Gold | (Argentina) Maria Jose Vargas |
| Silver | (Guatemala) Gabriela Martínez |
| Bronze | (Mexico) Jessica Parrilla (Argentina) Natalia Mendez |
- Men's doubles
| Gold | (Mexico) Andree Parrilla & Eduardo Portillo |
| Silver | (Canada) Coby Iwaasa & Samuel Murray |
| Bronze | (Bolivia) Kadim Carrasco & Conrrado Moscoso (United States) Adam Manilla & DJ Mendoza |
- Women's doubles
| Gold | (Mexico) Alexandra Herrera & Samantha Salas |
| Silver | (United States) Michelle Andersen & Erika Manilla |
| Bronze | (Ecuador) Maria Paz Muñoz & Veronica Sotomayor (Argentina) Maria Jose Vargas & Valeria Centellas |
- Mixed doubles
| Gold | (Mexico) Rodrigo Montoya & Samantha Salas |
| Silver | (Guatemala) Edwin Galicia & Gabriela Martinez |
| Bronze | (Canada) Samuel Murray & Juliette Parent (United States) Adam Manilla & Erika Manilla |

The International Racquetball Federation's 23rd Racquetball World Championships were held at the Centro Deportivo G2 in Temuco, Chile from October 16–24, 2026.

Bolivian Conrrado Moscoso won men's singles for a second time, defeating American Jake Bredenbeck, who was runner-up second for a second straight championships. Argentina's Maria Jose Vargas won women's singles for the first time, beating Guatemalan Gabriela Martinez, who played her fifth final.

Mexicans won all three of the doubles divisions. In men's doubles, Andree Parrilla and Eduardo Portillo defeated Canadians Coby Iwaasa and Samuel Murray, in what was a rematch of the 2024 final, which was won by the Canadians. Alexandra Herrera and Samantha Salas won women's doubles by beating Michelle Andersen and Erika Manilla in the final. Salas also won mixed doubles with Rodrigo Montoya and in the final, they defeated Guatemalans Edwin Galicia and Gabriela Martinez.

For the first time since 2002, Canada won the men's team event by defeating Mexico in the final, as Coby Iwaasa defeated Andree Parrilla and Samuel Murray beat Eduardo Portillo. Argentina won the women's team event with Natalia Mendez defeating American Lexi York and Maria Jose Vargas beating Michelle Andersen in the final. It was the first time since 2010 that Mexico hadn't won the women's team event.

== Tournament format ==
The 2026 World Championships had an individual competition (men's and women's singles and doubles as well as mixed doubles), as well as a team competition. The individual competition used a two-stage format to determine the World Champions. Initially, players competed in separate groups over three days. The results were used to seed players for an elimination round.

The individual events were followed by a team competition with countries competing head to head in best of three matches: two singles matches and a doubles match in men's and women's divisions. Order of the matches varied, and if one team won the first two matches, the third was not played.

== Participating nations ==
Players from 17 countries participated in Temuco.

Players by country
| Countries | Men | Women | Total |
|---|---|---|---|
| Argentina | 3 | 3 | 6 |
| Bolivia | 4 | 4 | 8 |
| Canada | 4 | 4 | 8 |
| Chile | 4 | 3 | 7 |
| Colombia | 1 | 1 | 2 |
| Costa Rica | 3 | 2 | 5 |
| Dominican Republic | 3 | 0 | 3 |
| Ecuador | 5 | 4 | 9 |
| Guatemala | 4 | 1 | 5 |
| Honduras | 1 | 0 | 1 |
| India | 4 | 0 | 4 |
| Ireland | 4 | 4 | 8 |
| Italy | 1 | 1 | 2 |
| Japan | 3 | 4 | 7 |
| Mexico | 3 | 3 | 6 |
| Peru | 1 | 0 | 1 |
| USA | 4 | 3 | 7 |
| Totals | 52 | 37 | 89 |

== Medal table ==
| Rank | Nation | Gold | Silver | Bronze | Total |
|---|---|---|---|---|---|
| 1 | Mexico (MEX) | 3 | 0 | 2 | 5 |
| 2 | Argentina (ARG) | 1 | 0 | 2 | 3 |
| 3 | Bolivia (BOL) | 1 | 0 | 1 | 2 |
| 4 | United States (USA) | 0 | 2 | 2 | 4 |
| 5 | Guatemala (GUA) | 0 | 2 | 0 | 2 |
| 6 | Canada (CAN) | 0 | 1 | 2 | 3 |
| 7 | Ecuador (ECU) | 0 | 0 | 1 | 1 |
| Totals (7 entries) | | 5 | 5 | 10 | 20 |

== Individual events ==
=== Men's singles ===
Semifinals
(United States) Jake Bredenbeck | 11 | 11 | 13
(Mexico) Eduardo Portillo | 5 | 6 | 11
(Canada) Trevor Webb | 6 | 5 | 6
(Bolivia) Conrrado Moscoso | 11 | 11 | 11

Final
(United States) Jake Bredenbeck | 8 | 7 | 11 | 10
(Bolivia) Conrrado Moscoso | 11 | 11 | 8 | 12

=== Women's singles ===
Semifinals
(Argentina) Natalia Mendez | 11 | 3 | 8 | 9
(Guatemala) Gabriela Martínez | 8 | 11 | 11 | 11
(Mexico) Jessica Parrilla | 11 | 8 | 5 | 9
(Argentina) Maria Jose Vargas | 6 | 11 | 11 | 11

Final
(Guatemala) Gabriela Martinez | 11 | 1 | 3 | 3
(Argentina) Maria Jose Vargas | 8 | 11 | 11 | 11

=== Men's doubles ===
Semifinals
(Canada) Coby Iwaasa & Samuel Murray | 11 | 11 | 11
(United States) Adam Manilla & DJ Mendoza | 8 | 4 | 5
(Bolivia) Kadim Carrasco & Conrrado Moscoso | 11 | 10 | 3
(Mexico) Andree Parrilla & Eduardo Portillo | 13 | 12 | 11

Final
(Canada) Coby Iwaasa & Samuel Murray | 10 | 11 | 5 | 11 | 6
(Mexico) Andree Parrilla & Eduardo Portillo | 12 | 7 | 11 | 9 | 11

=== Women's doubles ===
Semifinals
(Mexico) Alexandra Herrera & Samantha Salas | 11 | 13 | 11 | 11
(Ecuador) María Paz Muñoz & Veronica Sotomayor | 2 | 15 | 6 | 9
(United States) Michelle Andersen & Erika Manilla | 5 | 11 | 11 | 4 | 11
(Argentina) Maria Jose Vargas & Valeria Centellas | 11 | 8 | 9 | 11 | 8

Final
(Mexico) Alexandra Herrera & Samantha Salas | 11 | 11 | 7 | 8 | 11
(United States) Michelle Andersen & Erika Manilla | 8 | 8 | 11 | 11 | 6

=== Mixed doubles ===
Semifinals
(United States) Adam Manilla & Erika Manilla | 9 | 9 | 6
(Guatemala) Edwin Galicia & Gabriela Martinez | 11 | 11 | 11
(Canada) Samuel Murray & Juliette Parent | 8 | 10 | 6
(Mexico) Rodrigo Montoya & Samantha Salas | 11 | 12 | 11

Final
(Guatemala) Edwin Galicia & Gabriela Martinez | 6 | 9 | 6
(Mexico) Rodrigo Montoya & Samantha Salas | 11 | 11 | 11

== Team events ==
The team competition occurred after the individual events, and results from the individual events were used to seed countries for the team event. The team competition was a best of three matches: two singles and a doubles match. The order of the matches varied by round.

=== Men's team ===
First round
9 | Dominican Republic
8 | Chile
5 | Ecuador
12 | India
13 | Argentina
4 | Canada
11 | Japan
6 | Guatemala
7 | Costa Rica
10 | (Republic of Ireland) Ireland

Quarterfinals
Bolivia
Chile
Ecuador
Canada
(United States) USA
Guatemala
Costa Rica
Mexico

Semifinals
Bolivia | 0 | 1
Canada | 3 | 3
(United States) USA | 3 | 2 | 1
Mexico | 2 | 3 | 3

Final
Canada | 3 | 3
Mexico | 1 | 1

Semi-finals

| 23 October 2026 | Bolivia | 0–2 | Canada |

Mario Mercado | 0–1 | Coby Iwaasa | 11-6, 12-10, 11-6
Kadim Carrasco / Conrrado Moscoso | 3–3 | Coby Iwaasa / Samuel Murray | 11-5, 13-11, 1-11, 11-6

| 23 October 2026 | United States | 1–2 | Mexico |

Adam Manilla | 3–2 | Andree Parrilla | 7-11, 7-11, 11-5, 11-8, 11-6
Sam Bredenbeck / DJ Mendoza | 2–3 | Andree Parrilla / Eduardo Portillo | 10-12, 12-10, 11-6, 10-12, 11-5
Jake Bredenbeck | 1–3 | Eduardo Portillo | 11-6, 11-6, 5-11, 11-6

Final

| 24 October 2026 | Canada | 2–0 | Mexico |

Coby Iwaasa | 3–1 | Andree Parrilla | 14-12, 9-11, 11-7, 11-6
Samuel Murray | 3–1 | Eduardo Portillo | 3-11, 11-9, 11-4, 11-6

=== Women's team ===
First round
9 | Japan
8 | Canada
7 | Costa Rica
10 | (Republic of Ireland) Ireland

Quarterfinals
Mexico
Canada
Ecuador
Chile
(United States) USA
Bolivia
Costa Rica
Mexico

Semifinals
Argentina | 3 | 3
Ecuador | 0 | 1
(United States) USA | 3 | 0 | 3
Mexico | 0 | 3 | 1

Final
Argentina | 3 | 3
(United States) USA | 0 | 0

Semi-finals

| 23 October 2026 | Argentina | 2–0 | Ecuador |

Natalia Mendez | 3–0 | Maria Mendieta | 11-4, 11-3, 11-4
Valeria Centellas / Maria Jose Vargas | 3–1 | Maria Paz Muñoz / Veronica Sotomayor | 5-11, 11-5, 11-5, 11-5

| 23 October 2026 | United States | 2–1 | Mexico |

Lexi York | 3–0 | Jessica Parrilla | 11-4, 11-7, 12-10
Michelle Andersen / Erika Manilla | 0–3 | Alexandra Herrera / Samantha Salas | 11-3, 11-6, 11-7
Alexandra Herrera | 3–1 | Michelle Andersen | 11-7, 10-12, 11-7, 13-11

Final

| 24 October 2026 | Argentina | 2–0 | United States |

Natalia Mendez | 3–0 | Lexi York | 11-7, 12-10, 11-7
Maria Jose Vargas | 3–0 | Michelle Andersen | 11-7, 11–3, 11–8
