= 2024 in racquetball =

This topic lists the racquetball events for the 2024 year.

== 2024 International Racquetball Tour (Incomplete) ==
- January 25–28: 44th Annual Lewis Drug Pro-Am in (United States) Sioux Falls
  - Singles winner: (Canada) Samuel Murray
  - Doubles winners: (Mexico) Andree Parrilla & (Mexico) Eduardo Portillo
- February 29 – March 3: Hall of Fame of Minnesota in (United States) Minnesota
  - Singles winner: (Canada) Kane Waselenchuk
  - Doubles winners: (United States) Adam Manilla & (Mexico) Andree Parrilla
- March 14–17: Annual Papa Nicholas Shamrock in (United States) Lombard
  - Singles winner: (Canada) Kane Waselenchuk
  - Doubles winners: (United States) Adam Manilla & (Mexico) Andree Parrilla
- April 4–7: Annual Montana Winter Classic in (United States) Billings

== 2024 Ladies Professional Racquetball Tour (Incomplete) ==
- January 12–14: LPRT Arizona Open Presented by The Madison Trust in (United States) Tempe
  - Singles winner: (Argentina) María José Vargas
  - Doubles winners: (Mexico) Alexandra Herrera & (Mexico) Montserrat Mejía
- March 1–3: LPRT 2024 Boston Open in (United States) Marlborough
  - Singles winner: (Mexico) Paola Longoria
  - Doubles winners: (Argentina) Natalia Mendez & (Argentina) María José Vargas
