= Adam Manilla =

American racquetball player (born 1995)

Personal information
- Nationality: American
- Born: April 10, 1995 (age 31)

Sport
- Sport: Racquetball
- College team: University of Colorado - Boulder

Achievements and titles
- National finals: 1st Mixed Doubles - 2023
- Highest world ranking: 6th
Medal record
Men's Racquetball
Representing United States
World Championships
Bronze medal – third place	2024 San Antonio	Doubles
Bronze medal – third place	2024 San Antonio	Men's team
Pan American Games
Gold medal – first place	2023 Santiago	Mixed Doubles
Bronze medal – third place	2023 Santiago	Team

Adam Manilla (born April 10, 1995) is an American racquetball player. He is the current Pan American Games champion in Mixed Doubles winning the title in Santiago, Chile, with his sister Erika Manilla in 2023. He also helped the USA win the Men's Team title at the 2024 Racquetball World Championships in San Antonio, Texas. A left-handed player, Manilla has also won doubles titles on the International Racquetball Tour.

== 2009-2017 - Junior and college years ==
Manilla played for the USA Junior Team at the International Racquetball Federation (IRF) World Junior Championships several times. At the 2009 World Junior Championships in Santo Domingo, Dominican Republic, he and Zachary Wertz lost in the Boys U14 Doubles final to Mexicans Javier Estrada and Eduardo Garay, 12–15, 15–14, 11–9.

At the 2010 IRF World Juniors in Los Angeles, he lost in the quarterfinals of Boys U14 Singles to Canadian Coby Iwaasa, 8–15, 15–12, 11–6, and was 2nd in Boys U14 Doubles with Sawyer Lloyd, as they lost in the final to Mexicans Javier Estrada and Eduardo Garay, 12–15, 15–7, 11–1.

Manilla lost in the semi-finals of singles and doubles at the 2011 World Juniors in Santo Domingo, Dominican Republic. In Boys U16 Singles, he lost to Mexican Rodrigo Garay, 15–12, 15–3, and in Boys U16 Doubles with Nick Riffel to Dominican Republic's Ramon De Leon and Junior Rodriguez, 15–13, 15–11.

At the 2012 World Juniors in Los Angeles, Manilla suffered an injury during his Boys U16 Singles semi-final match versus Canadian Coby Iwaasa, and was unable to finish the match. The injury meant he and Sawyer Lloyd defaulted their semi-final doubles match to Iwaasa and Sami Harb.

2013 World Juniors in Sucre, Bolivia, Manilla lost in the Boys U18 Singles quarterfinals to Mexican Rodrigo Garay, 8–15, 15–10, 11–2. He and Sawyer Lloyd lost in the Boys U18 Doubles semi-finals to Garay and Javier Mar, 15–14, 15–7.

Manilla went to the University of Colorado Boulder, and played in his first USA Racquetball Intercollegiate Championship in 2014 at North Carolina State University in Raleigh, North Carolina, where he came 3rd. Manilla lost to Jose Diaz (Delta College), 12–15, 15–6, 11–2, in the semi-finals, then beat Joel Barshaw (Oregon State), 15–11, 15–14, in the 3rd place match. In doubles, Manilla and Nicholas Riffel lost in the final to Felipe Camacho and Brad Schopieray (Colorado State Pueblo), 12–15, 15–3, 11–0, after defeating Barshaw and Sam Reid in the semi-finals, 15–12, 15–12.

Manilla lost in the quarterfinals at the 2014 USA National Singles Championships to Marco Rojas, 15–14, 15–11, after defeating Robert Collins in the Round of 16, 15–10, 15–2.

At the 2014 IRF World Junior Championships in Cali, Colombia, Manilla lost in the quarterfinals of Boys U18 Singles to Bolivian Mario Mercado, 15–14, 5–15, 11–9. But in doubles he and Sawyer Lloyd beat Mercado and Conrrado Moscoso, 15–14, 15–11, in the semi-finals of Boys U18 Doubles, then lost in the final to Mexicans Erik Garcia and Javier Mar, 1–15, 15–13, 11–8.

Manilla won the USA Racquetball Intercollegiate Championship in 2015 at Arizona State University in Tempe, Arizona, where he was representing Colorado Boulder. He defeated Marco Rojas (University of the Pacific) in the final, 15–9, 7–15, 11–9. He also won doubles that year playing with Nicholas Riffel, and they beat Jacob Matthews and Brad Schopieray (Colorado State Pueblo), 15–8, 15–4.

At the 2015 USA National Singles Championships, Manilla defeated Jansen Allen, 15–14, 13–15, 11–8, in the quarterfinals, but lost to Jake Bredenbeck, 15–12, 15–13, in the semi-finals.

At the 2015 US Open, Manilla lost to Jansen Allen, 7–11, 9–11, 11–8, 11–3, 11–3, in the Round of 32. He played doubles with Nicholas Riffel, and they lost to Thomas Fuhrmann and Anthony Herrera, 15–11, 5–15, 11–10, in the Round of 32.

At the USA Racquetball Intercollegiate Championship in 2017 in Fountain Valley, California, Manilla lost in the semi-finals to Thomas Carter (Baldwin Wallace), 15–6, 13–15, 11–6, but won the 3rd place match against Mauro Rojas (Delta College), 15–12, 15–9. He and Nicholas Riffel also lost in the semi-finals of doubles, as Carter and Manolo Sandoval got the better of them, 15-12, 15-5, but they won the 3rd place match against Rojas and Francisco Troncoso, 15–14, 6–15, 11–6.

== 2018-2022 - Beginning to play the pro tour ==
Although Manilla had played a few matches on the International Racquetball Tour (IRT) prior to the 2017–18 season, it was never more than once in a season until that season, when he played 9 of the 11 events, and finished 15th in the rankings.

At the 2017 US Open, Manilla lost in the Round of 32 to Alvaro Beltran, 11–5, 11–4, 11–6. In doubles, he and Nicholas Riffel lost to Fernando Rios and Jose Daniel Ugalde, 15–7, 15–10.

Manilla and Nicholas Riffel played together at the 2018 USA Racquetball Doubles Championships, where they finished 4th. They defeated Jansen Allen and Charlie Pratt, 15–9, 15–19, in the quarterfinals, but lost to Rocky Carson and Sudsy Monchik, 8–15, 15–13, 11–8, and lost the 3rd place match to Jake Bredenbeck and Jose Diaz, 15–10, 14–15, 11-4. At the 2018 USAR Singles Championships, Manilla lost to Jose Diaz, 15–5, 12–15, 11–7, in the quarters.

Manilla lost in the Round of 32 at the 2018 US Open to Javier Mar, 15–5, 15–14, and in doubles with Nicholas Riffel, he also lost to Mar, who played with Rodrigo Montoya, 15–5, 14–15, 11–4, in the Round of 16.

Manilla and Nicholas Riffel played together at the 2019 USAR Doubles Championships, losing to Rocky Carson and Charlie Pratt, 15–11, 15–9, in the semi-finals. In the national team singles event that year, he lost to Jose Diaz in the quarterfinals.

At the 2019 USA Racquetball Singles Championships, Manilla reached the semi-finals, but lost to Jake Bredenbeck, 15–12, 7–15, 11–5.

Manilla defeated Sebastian Franco, 15–4, 15–7, in the Round of 32 at the 2019 US Open, but then lost in the Round of 16 to Sebastian Fernandez, 15–11, 15–8. He played doubles with Nicholas Riffel, and they lost to Javier Estrada and Ernesto Ochoa, 15–9, 15–8, in the Round of 16.

At the 2020 USA Racquetball Doubles Championships in Tempe, Arizona, Manilla and Nicholas Riffel lost to David Horn and Eric Garcia in the quarterfinals, 7–15, 15–3, 11–5. He also played in the national team singles event in Tempe, losing in the quarters to Alejandro Landa, 15–12, 15–4. The COVID-19 pandemic paused racquetball competitions for more than a year, and when USA Racquetball held its team qualifying event 2021, Manilla didn't play.

At the 2021 US Open, Manilla defeated Andrés Acuña, 11–15, 15–5, 11–2, in the Round of 32, but then lost to Kane Waselenchuk, 15–4, 15–8, in the Round of 16. In doubles, he and David Horn lost to Alejandro Landa and Samuel Murray, 15–1, 15–8, in the quarterfinals.

In 2022, USA Racquetball had their singles and doubles championships together. In singles, Manilla lost to Rocky Carson, 11–8, 11–8, 12–10, in the semi-finals. In doubles, he and David Horn, lost to Carson and Charlie Pratt, 11–5, 11–8, 7–11, 11–5, in the semi-finals. In mixed doubles, Manilla and sister Erika Manilla reached the final with a win over Sam Bredenbeck and Lexi York, 10–12, 11–2, 11–7, 11–9, but lost the final to Michelle De La Rosa and Alejandro Landa, 5–11, 11–4, 11–9, 12-10.

Manilla's first IRT title came in doubles in September 2022, when he played with Jake Bredenbeck at the Capitol Classic in Severna Park, Maryland. They defeated Javier Mar and Rodrigo Montoya in the quarterfinals, 9–15, 15–10, 11–1, then beat Samuel Murray and Andree Parrilla in the semi-finals, 15–11, 4–15, 11–3, and took out Andrés Acuña and Eduardo Portillo, 15-5, 15-11, in the final.

Manilla lost to Rocky Carson, 13–15, 15–7, 11–5, in the Round of 16 at the 2022 US Open. In doubles, he played with Sebastian Fernandez, and they beat Mario Mercado and Mauricio Zelada in the Round of 16, 15-12, 15-6, but lost in the quarterfinals to eventual winners Alvaro Beltran and Daniel De La Rosa, 12–15, 15–4, 11–4.

== 2023 to present - Winning gold for Team USA ==
Manilla won Mixed Doubles with is sister Erika Manilla at the 2023 USA National Doubles Championships in Tempe, Arizona. They defeated Jake Bredenbeck and Janel Tisinger-Ledkins in the quarterfinals, 8–11, 11–8, 11–3, 7–11, 11–2, then beat Sheryl Lotts and Charlie Pratt in the semi-finals, 12–10, 11–1, 11–7. In the final, the Manillas defeated Daniel De La Rosa and Hollie Scott, 11–6, 11–8, 10–12, 11–9. Manilla played doubles in Tempe with Wayne Antone, and they defeated Rocky Carson and Charlie Pratt, 13–11, 6–11, 9–11, 13–11, 11–8, in the semi-finals, but lost in the final to Daniel De La Rosa and Alejandro Landa, 15–13, 11–5, 11–8.

Manilla won his second IRT doubles title with Andree Parrilla in March 2023 at the 38th Annual Shamrock Shootout in Lombard, Illinois. They defeated Jake Bredenbeck and Samuel Murray, in the semi-finals, and Javier Mar and Rodrigo Montoya, 15-10, 15–10, in the final.

Manilla was runner up at the 2023 USA Racquetball National Singles Championship, as he lost to Daniel De La Rosa in the final, 3–11, 11–9, 11–8, 9–11, 11–6, after defeating Jake Bredenbeck in the semi-finals, 2–11, 11–8, 12–10, 11–2, and Thomas Carter in the quarterfinals, 9–11, 11–6, 14–12, 11-5.

The Manillas' Mixed Doubles win at USA Nationals qualified them to play Mixed Doubles on Team USA at the 2023 Pan American Games in Santiago, Chile. They won gold in Mixed Doubles in Santiago by defeating the Independent Athletes team of Edwin Galicia and Gabriela Martinez in the quarterfinals, then beat Mexicans Paola Longoria and Eduardo Portillo in the semi-finals. Then in the final, they defeated Argentina's Diego Garcia and Maria Jose Vargas, 12-4, 12-4, 13-6. Manilla helped the US to a bronze medal in the Men's Team competition in Santiago, as they reached the semi-finals, where they lost 2 matches to 0 to Mexico. In the semi-finals Manilla lost to Carlos Keller, 11-8, 11-9, 11-6.

Manilla's third and fourth IRT doubles titles came back to back in March 2024, as he and Andree Parrilla won the Minnesota Hall of Fame event in Minneapolis, and then the 39th Annual Shamrock Shootout in Lombard, Illinois. In Minneapolis, they defeated Kurtis Cullen and Rodrigo Montoya in the final, as Montoya went down with an injury in game one of the final. In Lombard, they beat Montoya and Erick Trujillo, 15–7, 7–15, 11–6.

Manilla lost in the semi-finals at the 2024 USA Racquetball National Championships to Daniel De La Rosa, 11–2, 11–3, 10–12, 11–9. He and Robert Collins lost in the semi-finals of men's doubles to De La Rosa and Sebastian Fernandez, 11–7, 11–13, 11–5, 11–7. In Mixed Doubles, he and Erika Manilla lost in the semi-finals to Thomas Carter and Kelani Lawrence, 11–6, 11–6, 9–11, 11–4.

He was part of Team USA at the 2024 Racquetball World Championships in San Antonio, Texas, where Manilla played Men's Doubles with Sebastian Fernandez. They defeated Koreans Gunhee Lee and Namwoo Lee in the quarterfinals, 11-4, 11-5, 11-4, but lost to Mexicans Andree Parrilla and Eduardo Portillo in the semi-finals, 11-4, 2-11, 11-7, 12-10. Manilla and Fernandez helped the USA win the Men's Team event at Worlds, defeating Canada in the final, 2-1. They won the decisive match of the final, defeating Canadians Coby Iwaasa and Samuel Murray, 12–10, 11–4, 6–11, 11–9.

== Career summary ==
Manilla has played for the US at the Pan American Games and the IRF World Championships, winning gold at both competitions. He's also won multiple doubles titles on the International Racquetball Tour.

=== Career record ===
This table lists Manilla's results across annual events.

Event	2012	2013	2014	2015	2016	2017	2018	2019	2020	2021	2022	2023	2024
USAR National Singles	-	-	QF	SF	-	-	QF	SF	P	-	SF	F	SF
USAR National Doubles	-	-	-	-	-	-	4th	SF	QF	-	SF	F	SF
USAR National Mixed Doubles											F	W	SF
US Open	-	-	-	32	-	32	32	32	P	16	16	-	-
US Open Doubles	-	-	-	32	-	32	16	16	P	QF	QF	-	-
IRT Ranking	52	66	60	184	74	-	15	19	21	14	12	6	

Note: W = winner, F = finalist, SF = semi-finalist, QF = quarterfinalist, 16 = Round of 16. P = Cancellation due to COVID-19 pandemic.

== Personal life ==
Manilla grew up in Centennial, Colorado. He started playing racquetball at the Denver Athletic Club, as did his younger sister Erika. Manilla has a B.Eng. in mechanical engineering from the University of Colorado Boulder. He created Manilla Athletics - an on-line racquetball coaching platform - in 2020 with his sister.
