= 2024 Racquetball World Championships – Mixed doubles =

Mixed doubles at the XXII Racquetball World Championships
- Location: San Antonio, Texas, United States
- Dates: August 24–31, 2024

Medalists
gold medal	(United States) Daniel De La Rosa & Hollie Scott
silver medal	(Mexico) Javier Mar & Montserrat Mejia
bronze medal	(Guatemala) Edwin Galicia & Gabriela Martinez (Bolivia) Angélica Barrios & Conrrado Moscoso

The International Racquetball Federation's 22nd Racquetball World Championships were held in San Antonio, Texas, United States from August 24–31, 2024. This was the first time that Worlds was held in the USA since 1996, when it was held in Phoenix, Arizona.

The 2024 World Championships used a best of five games match format with each game to 11 points, win by 2, with rally scoring.

Americans Daniel De La Rosa and Hollie Scott defeated Mexicans Javier Mar and Montserrat Mejia in the final, 11–9, 10–12, 11–9, 14–12, to win mixed doubles, which was a first for both them and the USA. This was De La Rosa's second title in San Antonio, as he also won men's singles.

== Tournament format ==
The 2024 World Championships used a two-stage format to determine the World Champions. Initially, players competed in separate groups over three days. The results were used to seed players for the medal round, with only the top two players from each group advancing to the medal round.

== Men's doubles ==
=== Preliminary round ===
Group 1

Players	Pld	W	L	GW	GL	PW	PL	Place
(Mexico) Javier Mar & Montserrat Mejia	2	2	0	6	2	80	55	1
(Chile) Carla Muñoz & Alan Natera	2	1	1	5	3	73	65	2
(Japan) Yuki Nakano & Saki Kokido	2	0	2	0	6	33	66	3

Group 2

Players	Pld	W	L	GW	GL	PW	PL	Place
(Guatemala) Edwin Galicia & Gabriela Martinez	2	3	0	6	1	72	49	1
(Canada) Frédérique Lambert & Samuel Murray	2	1	1	4	3	64	57	2
(Dominican Republic) Merynanyelly Delgado & Ramón de León	2	0	2	0	6	37	67	3

Group 3

Players	Pld	W	L	GW	GL	PW	PL	Place
(Bolivia) Angélica Barrios & Conrrado Moscoso	3	3	0	9	1	109	50	1
(South Korea) Gunhee Lee & Sumin Lee	3	2	1	6	6	108	99	2
(Ecuador) Juan Francisco Cueva & Ana Lucia Sarmiento	3	1	2	5	6	86	105	3
(Italy) Cristina Amaya & Carlo Papini	3	0	3	2	9	67	116	4

Group 4

Players	Pld	W	L	GW	GL	PW	PL	Place
(United States) Daniel De La Rosa & Hollie Scott	3	3	0	9	3	123	97	1
(Argentina) Valeria Centellas & Gerson Miranda Martínez	3	2	1	8	4	116	102	2
(Costa Rica) Andrés Acuña & Larissa Faeth	3	1	2	5	6	98	100	3
(Republic of Ireland) Patrick Hanley & Aisling Hickey	3	0	3	0	9	61	99	4

=== Medal round ===
Quarterfinals
1	(Mexico) Javier Mar & Montserrat Mejia	11	11	11
8	(Chile) Carla Muñoz & Alan Natera	7	9	7
5	(Argentina) Valeria Centellas & Gerson Miranda Martinez	4	6	6
4	(Bolivia) Angélica Barrios & Conrrado Moscoso	11	11	11
3	(United States) Daniel De La Rosa & Hollie Scott	11	11	11
6	(South Korea) Gunhee Lee & Sumin Lee	7	5	7
7	(Canada) Frédérique Lambert & Samuel Murray	11	8	11	11	13
2	(Guatemala) Edwin Galicia & Gabriela Martinez	13	11	1	9	15

Semifinals
1	(Mexico) Javier Mar & Montserrat Mejia	11	9	10	11	11
4	(Bolivia) Angélica Barrios & Conrrado Moscoso	6	11	12	7	9
3	(United States) Daniel De La Rosa & Hollie Scott	10	14	11	11
2	(Guatemala) Edwin Galicia & Gabriela Martinez	12	12	7	8

Final
1	(Mexico) Javier Mar & Montserrat Mejia	9	12	9	12
2	(United States) Daniel De La Rosa & Hollie Scott	11	10	11	14
