= Javier Mar =

Mexican racquetball player (born 1995)

Personal information
- Nationality: Mexican
- Born: Franciso Javier Mar Garcia; April 11, 1995 (age 31)

Sport
- Sport: Racquetball

Achievements and titles
- World finals: 1st Doubles 2021
Medal record
Men's Racquetball
Representing Mexico
Pan American Games
Gold medal – first place	2023 Santiago	Doubles
Bronze medal – third place	2023 Santiago	Team
Gold medal – first place	2019 Lima	Doubles
Bronze medal – third place	2019 Lima	Team
World Championships
Silver medal – second place	2024 San Antonio	Mixed Doubles
Gold medal – first place	2024 San Antonio	Team
Gold medal – first place	2021 Guatemala City	Doubles
Pan Am Championships
Gold medal – first place	2026 Guatemala City	Doubles
Gold medal – first place	2026 Guatemala City	Team
Silver medal – second place	2025 Guatemala City	Singles
Bronze medal – third place	2025 Guatemala City	Team
Bronze medal – third place	2019 Barranquilla	Doubles
Bronze medal – third place	2017 San José	Singles
Bronze medal – third place	2016 San Luis Potosi	Singles
Central American and Caribbean Games
Gold medal – first place	2023 San Salvador	Doubles
Gold medal – first place	2023 San Salvador	Team

Javier Mar (born April 11, 1995) is a Mexican racquetball player. Mar is the current two time Pan American Games champion in Men's Doubles with Rodrigo Montoya, first winning gold at the 2019 Pan American Games in Lima, Peru and then again at the 2023 Pan American Games in Santiago, Chile. He's a former International Racquetball Federation (IRF) World Champion in Men's Doubles with Montoya, winning that title in 2021. Mar has also won doubles titles on the International Racquetball Tour.

== Junior years ==
Mar played at the IRF World Junior Championships several times. He won Boys U14 Singles in 2010 in Los Angeles, defeating fellow Mexican Roman Ramos in final, 10–15, 15–9, 11–10.

At the 2012 World Junior Championships in Los Angeles, Mar lost in the Boys U16 Singles Round of 16 to Bolivian Conrrado Moscoso, 15–14, 15–14, but he and Rodrigo Montoya won Boys U16 Doubles, defeating Canadians Sami Harb and Coby Iwaasa in final, 15–8, 15–12.

He won Boys U18 Doubles at the 2013 World Junior Championships in Sucre, Bolivia with Rodrigo Garay, as they defeated Bolivians Conrrado Moscoso and Sebastian Oña in the final, 15–8, 15–14.

Mar again won Boys U18 Doubles at World Juniors in 2014 - this time with Erik Garcia - in Cali, Colombia, as they defeated Americans Sawyer Lloyd and Adam Manilla in the final, 1–15, 15–13, 11–8. But he lost in Boys U18 Singles in the quarterfinals Conrrado Moscoso, 5–15, 15–11, 11–7.

== 2014-2018 - Beginning to play the pro tour and for Mexico ==
Mar has played at least once on the International Racquetball Tour (IRT) since the 2014-15 season, but it wasn't until the 2019-20 season that he played more than two events in a season.

Mar first played for Mexican national team at the 2016 Pan American Championships in San Luis Potosí, Mexico, where he played Men's Singles. He defeated Costa Rican Andrés Acuña in the quarterfinals, 15–11, 15–11, but then lost in the semi-finals to American Jake Bredenbeck, 15–8, 14–15, 11–6, resulting in a bronze medal.

Mar played Men's Singles at the 2016 World Championships in Cali, Colombia, where he defeated Japan's Yuki Nakano, 15–5, 15–6, in the Round of 16, but then lost to American Rocky Carson, 15–9, 15–9, in the quarterfinals.

At the 2016 US Open Racquetball Championships, Mar played doubles with Eduardo Garay, and they lost in the Round of 32 to Daniel De La Rosa and Edson Martinez, 15–4, 15–6. In singles, he defeated Jansen Allen in the Round of 32, 11–8, 11–1, 11–2, but then lost to Jake Bredenbeck in the Round 16, 11–2, 11–5, 4–11, 12–10.

Mar represented Mexico in Men's Singles at the 2017 Pan American Championships in San José, Costa Rica, where he defeated Canadian Samuel Murray, 6–15, 15–4, 11–3, in the quarterfinals, but then lost to American Charlie Pratt in the semi-finals, 5–15, 15–13, 11–3, resulting in a bronze medal.

At the 2017 US Open Racquetball Championships, Mar reached the quarterfinals in singles, as he beat Samuel Murray in the Round of 32, 11–6, 11–2, 11–3, then defeated Mario Mercado in the Round of 16, 12–10, 11–5, 11–9, before losing to Rocky Carson in the quarters, 11–5, 11–4, 11–6. He played doubles with Edson Martinez, and they defeated Sudsy Monchik and Cliff Swain, 13–15, 15–12, 11–5, in the Round of 32, but lost to Rodrigo Montoya and Andree Parrilla in the Round of 16, 15–13, 15–12.

His first IRT success came in 2018, when he and Rodrigo Montoya won doubles at the 40th Annual Lewis Drug Pro-Am in Sioux Falls, South Dakota. They upset top seeds Alvaro Beltran and Daniel De La Rosa in the quarterfinals, 15–12, 15–8, then defeated Jansen Allen and Felipe Camacho in the semi-finals, 15–10, 15–12, and Jake Bredenbeck and Jose Diaz in the final, 15–13, 15–12.

Mar lost in the Round of 16 at the 2018 US Open to Kane Waselenchuk, 15–12, 15–10, but reached the semi-finals in doubles with Rodrigo Montoya by defeating Alejandro Landa and Samuel Murray in the quarterfinals, 13–15, 15–6, 11–5, but then lost to Alvaro Beltran and Daniel De La Rosa in the semis, 15–14, 8–15, 11–8.

== 2019-present - Winning gold for Mexico ==
Mar played Men's Doubles with Rodrigo Montoya at the 2019 Pan American Racquetball Championships in Barranquilla, Colombia. They lost to Bolivians Roland Keller and Conrrado Moscoso in the semi-finals, 14–15, 15–11, 11–7.

Mar and Montoya also played doubles at the 2019 Pan American Games in Lima, Peru, where they won gold. They defeated Americans Rocky Carson and Charlie Pratt in the semi-finals, 11–15, 15–9, 11–8, and then beat Bolivians Roland Keller and Conrrado Moscoso in the final, 15–10, 15–1. Mar also competed in the Men's Team event, where Mexico lost in the semi-finals to Colombia, 2–1.

Mar defeated Rodrigo Montoya, 11–15, 15–13, 11–9, in the Round of 32 at the 2019 US Open, and then defeated Carlos Keller, 11–15, 15–5, 11–4, in the Round of 16, but lost in the quarterfinals to Kane Waselenchuk, 15–5, 15–3. In doubles, Mar and Montoya lost to Roland Keller and Conrrado Moscoso, 8–15, 15–11, 11–6, in the Round of 16.

At the 2021 US Open, Mar played doubles with Rodrigo Montoya, and they defeated Andree Parrilla and Eduardo Portillo in the quarterfinals, 15–10, 12–15, 11–3, but lost to Alvaro Beltran and Daniel De La Rosa, 15–10, 12–15, 11–8, in the semi-finals.

Mar played Men's Doubles with Rodrigo Montoya at the 2021 IRF World Championships in Guatemala City, Guatemala, and they won gold by defeating Bolivia's Roland Keller and Conrrado Moscoso, 15–10, 15–9, in the final after beating the USA's Alejandro Landa and Charlie Pratt, 15–2, 15–13, in the semi-finals.

In 2022, Mar reached the final of an IRT event for the first time. At the 2022 Capital Classic in Millersville, Maryland, he defeated Andree Parrilla in the Round of 16, 15–10, 15–11, then beat Jake Bredenbeck, 15–7, 15–8, in the quarterfinals, and got a narrow victory over Samuel Murray, 15–13, 15–13, in the semi-finals. In the final, Mar lost to Eduardo Portillo, 15–7, 15–3.

At the 2022 US Open, Mar lost in the Round of 16 to Samuel Murray, 10–15, 15–3, 11–8, and played doubles with Rodrigo Montoya, and they lost to Jake Bredenbeck and Sam Bredenbeck, 15–7, 15–10.

At the Racquetball at the 2023 Central American and Caribbean Games, Mar won two gold medals. He and Rodrigo Montoya won gold in Men's Doubles, as they defeated Costa Ricans Andrés Acuña and Gabriel Garcia in the final, 11–6, 11–5, 10–12, 9–11, 11–6. He also helped Mexico win gold in the Men's Team event, and they Costa Rica in that final also.

At the 2023 Pan American Games in Santiago, Chile, Mar won Men's Doubles with Rodrigo Montoya, as they defeated Canadians Coby Iwaasa and Samuel Murray in the final, 6–11, 11–7, 12–10, 12–10, after beating Costa Ricans Andrés Acuña and Gabriel Garcia in the semi-finals, 11–4, 11–7, 11–4. In Mixed Doubles, In the Men's Team event, Mexico lost to Canada, 2–1, in the semi-finals.

Mar was a silver medalist in Mixed Doubles at the 2024 World Championships with Montserrat Mejia in San Antonio, Texas. They reached the final by defeating Bolivians Angélica Barrios and Conrrado Moscoso in the semi-finals, 11–6, 9–11, 10–12, 11–7, 11–9, but lost the final to Americans Daniel De La Rosa and Hollie Scott, 11–9, 10–12, 11–9, 14–12. He also helped Mexico to a bronze medal in the Men's Team event, as they defeated Guatemala in the quarterfinals, but lost to Canada in the semi-finals.

== Career summary ==
Mar has medaled for Mexico at the Pan American Games, World Championships, Central American and Caribbean Games, as well as the Pan American Championships, highlighted by gold in Men's Doubles at the 2021 World Championships and gold in Men's Doubles at the 2019 and 2023 Pan American Games; those three wins came with Rodrigo Montoya.

While Mar has played at least two tournaments on the International Racquetball Tour every season since 2017-18, he has not played much more than half of the tournaments in any one season. Yet he has won 8 doubles titles, and been in one singles final.

=== Career record ===
This table lists Mar's results across annual events.

Event	2015	2016	2017	2018	2019	2020	2021	2022	2023	2024
US Open	-	16	QF	16	QF	P	-	16	-	-
US Open Doubles	-	32	16	SF	16	P	SF	QF	-	-
IRT Ranking	52	34	25	21	23	15	20	19	13	

Note: W = winner, F = finalist, SF = semi-finalist, QF = quarterfinalist, 16 = Round of 16. P = Cancellation due to COVID-19 pandemic.
