= Racquetball at the 2023 Pan American Games – Men's doubles =

Men's doubles at the 2023 Pan American Games
- Venue: Racket Sports Center
- Dates: October 21 - October 24
- Competitors: 20 from 10 nations

Medalists
| Gold medal | Javier Mar; Rodrigo Montoya | Mexico |
| Silver medal | Samuel Murray; Coby Iwaasa | Canada |
| Bronze medal | Andrés Acuña; Gabriel Garcia | Costa Rica |
| Bronze medal | Juan José Salvatierra; Edwin Galicia | Independent Athletes Team |

The men's doubles competition of the racquetball events at the 2023 Pan American Games will be held from October 21 to 24 at Racket Sports Center in Santiago, Chile.

== Schedule ==
| Date | Time | Round |
|---|---|---|
| October 21, 2023 | 15:00 | Round of 16 |
| October 22, 2023 | 16:00 | Quarterfinals |
| October 23, 2023 | 15:00 | Semifinals |
| October 24, 2023 | 14:00 | Finals |

== Results ==
Round of 16 (October 21)
Maykel Moyet (CUB); Yandy Espinosa (CUB) | 0
Diego García (ARG); Fernando Kurzbard (ARG) | 3
Juan José Salvatierra (EAI); Edwin Galicia (EAI) | 3
Rafael Gatica (CHI); Rodrigo Salgado (CHI) | 1

Quarterfinals (October 22)
Rodrigo Montoya (MEX); Javier Mar (MEX) | 3
Diego García (ARG); Fernando Kurzbrd (ARG) | 0
José Daniel Ugalde (ECU); Juan Cueva (ECU) | 0
Gabriel García (CRC); Andrés Acuña (CRC) | 3
Alejandro Landa (USA); Daniel de la Rosa (USA) | 2
Samuel Murray (CAN); Coby Iwaasa (CAN) | 3
Juan José Salvatierra (EAI); Edwin Galicia (EAI) | 3
Conrrado Moscoso (BOL); Kadim Carrasco (BOL) | 1

Semifinals (October 23)
Rodrigo Montoya (MEX); Javier Mar (MEX) | 3
Gabriel García (CRC); Andrés Acuña (CRC)
Samuel Murray (CAN); Coby Iwaasa (CAN) | 3
Juan José Salvatierra (EAI); Edwin Galicia (EAI) | 2

Final (October 24)
Rodrigo Montoya (MEX); Javier Mar (MEX) | 3
Samuel Murray (CAN); Coby Iwaasa (CAN) | 1
