= Racquetball at the 2026 Central American and Caribbean Games =

- Venue: Centro Olímpico Juan Pablo Duarte
- Location: Santo Domingo, Dominican Republic
- Dates: 25 July–1 August

The racquetball competition at the 2026 Central American and Caribbean Games was held in Santo Domingo, Dominican Republic, from 25 July to 1 August 2026 at the Centro Olímpico Juan Pablo Duarte.

Mexico won six of the seven racquetball events. Rodrigo Montoya defeated his team-mate Eduardo Portillo in the men's singles final, 11–4, 11–4, 11–6. Portillo and Andree Parrilla won men's doubles by defeating Christian Aldana and Juan Salvatierra of Guatemala in the final, 11–1, 12–10, 11–8.

Mexican Alexandra Herrera defeated Guatemalan Gabriela Martínez in the women's singles final, She and Montserrat Mejia also won the women's doubles gold by beating Martínez and María Renée Rodríguez in the final, 11–8, 11–4, 11–6.

Mexico won both team events. They defeated Costa Rica in the men's team final, 2–0, and Guatemala in the women's team final, 2–1.

Costa Ricans Andrés Acuña and Larissa Faeth prevented the Mexican gold medal sweep by winning mixed doubles. They defeated Mexicans Montoya and Jessica Parrilla, 6–11, 11–7, 11–4, 11–9, in the final.

== Participating nations ==
A total of 7 nations qualified athletes. The number of athletes a nation entered is in parentheses beside the name of the country.

- Costa Rica (5)
- Cuba (6)
- Dominican Republic (6)
- Guatemala (6)
- Honduras (2)
- Mexico (6)
- Venezuela (4)

== Medal table ==
* Host nation (Dominican Republic)

Rank	Nation	Gold	Silver	Bronze	Total
1	Mexico (MEX)	6	2	0	8
2	Costa Rica (CRC)	1	1	5	7
3	Guatemala (GUA)	0	4	2	6
4	Dominican Republic (DOM)*	0	0	5	5
5	Cuba (CUB)	0	0	2	2
Totals (5 entries)		7	7	14	28

== Medal summary ==
Event	Gold	Silver	Bronze
Men's singles	Rodrigo Montoya; Mexico	Eduardo Portillo; Mexico	Andrés Acuña; Costa Rica
Men's singles	Rodrigo Montoya; Mexico	Eduardo Portillo; Mexico	Ramón de León; Dominican Republic
Women's singles	Alexandra Herrera; Mexico	Gabriela Martínez; Guatemala	Larissa Faeth; Costa Rica
Women's singles	Alexandra Herrera; Mexico	Gabriela Martínez; Guatemala	María Jesús Céspedes; Dominican Republic
Men's doubles	Mexico; Eduardo Portillo; Andree Parrilla	Guatemala; Christian Aldana; Juan Salvatierra	Costa Rica; Sergio Acuña; Andrés Acuña
Men's doubles	Mexico; Eduardo Portillo; Andree Parrilla	Guatemala; Christian Aldana; Juan Salvatierra	Dominican Republic; Junior Rodríguez; Luis Pérez
Women's doubles	Mexico; Alexandra Herrera; Montserrat Mejía	Guatemala; Gabriela Martínez; María Renée Rodríguez	Costa Rica; Jimena Gómez; Larissa Faeth
Women's doubles	Mexico; Alexandra Herrera; Montserrat Mejía	Guatemala; Gabriela Martínez; María Renée Rodríguez	Dominican Republic; Alejandra Jiménez; María Céspedes
Mixed doubles	Costa Rica; Andrés Acuña; Larissa Faeth	Mexico; Rodrigo Montoya; Jessica Parrilla	Guatemala; María Renée Rodríguez; Christian Aldana
Mixed doubles	Costa Rica; Andrés Acuña; Larissa Faeth	Mexico; Rodrigo Montoya; Jessica Parrilla	Cuba; Maykel Moyet; Ana Cardentey
Men's team	Mexico; Rodrigo Montoya; Andree Parrilla; Eduardo Portillo	Costa Rica; Gabriel García; Andrés Acuña; Sergio Acuña	Cuba; Maykel Moyet; Christhian Menéndez; Yandy Espinosa
Men's team	Mexico; Rodrigo Montoya; Andree Parrilla; Eduardo Portillo	Costa Rica; Gabriel García; Andrés Acuña; Sergio Acuña	Guatemala; Héctor Sierra; Christian Aldana; Juan Salvatierra
Women's team	Mexico; Montserrat Mejía; Alexandra Herrera; Jessica Parrilla	Guatemala; Gabriela Martínez; María Renée Rodríguez; Andrea Reyes	Costa Rica; Jimena Gómez; Larissa Faeth
Women's team	Mexico; Montserrat Mejía; Alexandra Herrera; Jessica Parrilla	Guatemala; Gabriela Martínez; María Renée Rodríguez; Andrea Reyes	Dominican Republic; María Jesús Céspedes; Alejandra Jiménez; Luz Moreta
