= Racquetball at the 2023 Pan American Games – Men's team =

Racquetball – Men's team at the 2023 Pan American Games
- Venue: Racket Sports Center
- Start date: October 21, 2023
- End date: October 26, 2023

Medalists
Gold medal	Carlos Keller; Kadim Carrasco; Conrrado Moscoso	Bolivia
Silver medal	Coby Iwaasa; Samuel Murray	Canada
Bronze medal	Daniel De La Rosa; Alejandro Landa; Adam Manilla	United States
Bronze medal	Javier Mar; Rodrigo Montoya; Eduardo Portillo	Mexico

The Men's Team racquetball competition at the 2023 Pan American Games in Santiago, Chile will be held between October 24 and 26 at the Racket Sports Center.

== Schedule ==
Date	Time	Round
October 24, 2023	17:00	First Round
October 25, 2023	10:00	Quarterfinals
October 25, 2023	14:00	Semifinals
October 26, 2023	11:00	Final

== Playoffs ==
First Round
Cuba	2	1
Independent Athletes Team	3	3
Argentina	3	1	3
Chile	2	3	0

Quarterfinals
Mexico	3	3
Independent Athletes Team	0	0
Costa Rica	2	1
Canada	3	3
United States	3	3
Ecuador	1	0
Argentina	1	0
Bolivia	3	3

Semifinals
Mexico	3	0	1
Canada	0	3	3
United States	0	3	2
Bolivia	3	2	3

Final
Canada	2	0
Bolivia	3	3
