= 2024 Pan American Racquetball Championships =

The 2024 Pan American Racquetball Championships were held in Guatemala City, Guatemala, March 23–30. Argentina's Maria Jose Vargas won both Women's Singles and Women's Doubles with Natalia Mendez. Mexican Rodrigo Montoya won Men's Singles, and Costa Ricans Andrés Acuña and Gabriel Garcia won Men's Doubles. Americans Sam Bredenbeck and Michelle Key won Mixed Doubles. There was also a Men's and Women's Team competition, which was won by Mexico and Argentina, respectively.

== Tournament format ==
The competition had seven events: five individual events and two team events. The individual events were played first: Men's and Women's Singles and Doubles and Mixed Doubles. Each individual event had a group stage followed by a medal round. The results of the group stage were used to seed players for the medal round. The group stage began March 23 and concluded March 25. The medal round began March 26 and concluded March 28. The team events were held on March 29 and 30.

== Participating nations ==
A total of 42 athletes (22 men & 20 women) from 9 countries participated.

- Argentina (3)
- Canada (6)
- Chile (4)
- Costa Rica (4)
- Cuba (5)
- Dominican Republic (6)
- Guatemala (6)
- Honduras (2)
- United States (6)

== Medal summary ==
=== Medal table ===
Rank	Nation	Gold	Silver	Bronze	Total
1	Argentina (ARG)	3	0	2	5
2	Mexico (MEX)	2	0	1	3
3	United States (USA)	1	2	3	6
4	Costa Rica (CRC)	1	0	2	3
5	Canada (CAN)	0	3	1	4
6	Chile (CHI)	0	1	3	4
7	Dominican Republic (DOM)	0	1	2	3
Totals (7 entries)		7	7	14	28

=== Medalists ===
Event	Gold	Silver	Bronze
Men's events
Singles	Rodrigo Montoya; Mexico	Samuel Murray; Canada	Andrés Acuña; Costa Rica Jake Bredenbeck; United States
Doubles	Andrés Acuña; Gabriel Garcia; Costa Rica	Coby Iwaasa; Samuel Murray; Canada	Sebastian Hernández; Rodrigo Montoya; Mexico Jake Bredenbeck; Sam Bredenbeck; United States
Team	Sebastian Hernández; Rodrigo Montoya; Mexico	Jake Bredenbeck; Sam Bredenbeck; Charlie Pratt; United States	Kurtis Cullen; Coby Iwaasa; Samuel Murray; Canada Andrés Acuña; Gabriel Garcia; Costa Rica
Women's events
Singles	María José Vargas; Argentina	Carla Muñoz; Chile	Merynanyelly Delgado; Dominican Republic Natalia Mendez; Argentina
Doubles	Natalia Mendez; Maria Jose Vargas; Argentina	Naomi Ros; Lexi York; United States	María Céspedes; Merynanyelly Delgado; Dominican Republic Paula Mansilla; Carla Muñoz; Chile
Team	Natalia Mendez; Maria Jose Vargas; Argentina	María Céspedes; Merynanyelly Delgado; Alejandra Jiménez; Dominican Republic	Michelle Key; Naomi Ros; Lexi York; United States Paula Mansilla; Carla Muñoz; Chile
Mixed events
Doubles	Sam Bredenbeck; Michelle Key; United States	Coby Iwaasa; Juliette Parent; Canada	Jaime Mansilla; Carla Muñoz; Chile Natalia Mendez; Gerson Miranda; Argentina

== Men’s singles ==
=== Preliminary round ===
Group 1

Players	Pld	W	L	GW	GL	PW	PL	Place
(Mexico) Rodrigo Montoya	2	2	0	6	0	68	32	1
(Canada) Kurtis Cullen	2	1	1	3	5	73	81	2
(Guatemala) Jose Caceres	2	0	2	2	6	56	84	3

Group 2

Players	Pld	W	L	GW	GL	PW	PL	Place
(United States) Jake Bredenbeck	3	3	0	9	0	99	47	1
(Guatemala) Edwin Galicia	3	2	1	6	4	86	65	2
(Chile) Jaime Mansilla	3	1	2	3	6	73	84	3
(Honduras) Sergio Ortega	3	0	3	0	9	37	99	4

Group 3

Players	Pld	W	L	GW	GL	PW	PL	Place
(Canada) Samuel Murray	3	3	0	9	0	101	62	1
(Mexico) Sebastian Hernández	3	2	1	6	3	94	67	2
(Dominican Republic) Ramón de León	3	1	2	4	6	66	87	3
(Cuba) Enier Chacon	3	0	3	0	9	55	100	4

Group 4

Players	Pld	W	L	GW	GL	PW	PL	Place
(United States) Charlie Pratt	3	3	0	9	4	131	105	1
(Costa Rica) Gabriel Garcia	3	2	1	8	4	111	85	2
(Chile) Rafael Gatica	3	1	2	5	7	100	114	3
(Honduras) Carlos Medrano	3	0	3	2	9	77	115	4

Group 5

Players	Pld	W	L	GW	GL	PW	PL	Place
(Costa Rica) Andrés Acuña	3	3	0	9	2	112	57	1
(Argentina) Gerson Miranda	3	2	1	8	3	103	81	2
(Cuba) Maikel Moyet	3	1	2	5	6	39	99	3
(Dominican Republic) Jean Marco Pumarol	3	0	3	0	9	65	82	4

=== Medal round ===
First Round
9	(Canada) Kurtis Cullen	8	7	11	11	5
8	(Costa Rica) Gabriel Garcia	11	11	6	9	11
7	(Mexico) Sebastian Hernández	11	11	11
10	(Guatemala) Edwin Galicia	6	7	9

Quarterfinals
1	(Mexico) Rodrigo Montoya	11	11	11
8	(Costa Rica) Gabriel Garcia	5	6	5
5	(Costa Rica) Andrés Acuña	11	11	11
4	(United States) Charlie Pratt	2	4	5
3	(Canada) Samuel Murray	10	11	11	12
6	(Argentina) Gerson Miranda	12	8	3	10
7	(Mexico) Sebastian Hernández	1	2	11	12	9
2	(United States) Jake Bredenbeck	11	11	8	10	11

Semifinals
1	(Mexico) Rodrigo Montoya	11	11	11
5	(Costa Rica) Andrés Acuña	9	2	3
3	(Canada) Samuel Murray	11	11	11
2	(United States) Jake Bredenbeck	3	0	3

Final
1	(Mexico) Rodrigo Montoya	11	6	15	11
3	(Canada) Samuel Murray	7	11	13	8

== Men’s doubles ==
Group 1

Players	Pld	W	L	GW	GL	PW	PL	Place
(Mexico) Sebastian Hernández & Rodrigo Montoya	2	2	0	6	2	83	49	1
(Chile) Rafael Gatica & Jaime Mansilla	2	1	1	5	3	66	64	2
(Cuba) Yandy Espinosa & Maikel Moyet	2	0	2	0	6	30	66	3

Group 2

Players	Pld	W	L	GW	GL	PW	PL	Place
(Canada) Coby Iwaasa & Samuel Murray	2	2	0	6	1	73	41	1
(Guatemala) Edwin Galicia & Juan Salvatierra	2	1	1	4	3	62	56	2
(Honduras) Carlos Medrano & Sergio Ortega	2	0	2	0	6	28	66	3

Group 3

Players	Pld	W	L	GW	GL	PW	PL	Place
(United States) Jake Bredenbeck & Sam Bredenbeck	2	2	0	6	2	76	56	6
(Costa Rica) Andrés Acuña & Gabriel Garcia	2	1	1	5	3	75	59	5
(Dominican Republic) Ramón de León & Diego Pimentel	2	0	2	0	6	30	66	3

=== Medal Round ===
First Round
9	(Dominican Republic) Ramón de León & Diego Pimentel	11	13	6	6	11
8	(Cuba) Yandy Espinosa & Maikel Moyet	6	11	11	11	9

Quarterfinals
1	(Mexico) Rodrigo Montoya & Sebastian Hernández	11	12	11
8	(Dominican Republic) Ramón de León & Diego Pimentel	4	10	6
5	(Chile) Rafael Gatica & Jaime Mansilla	11	3	6	0
4	(Costa Rica) Andrés Acuña & Gabriel Garcia	9	11	11	11
3	(United States) Jake Bredenbeck & Sam Bredenbeck	11	13	12	11
6	(Guatemala) Edwin Galicia & Juan Salvatierra	8	11	12	8
7	(Honduras) Carlos Medrano & Sergio Ortega	5	4	5
2	(Canada) Coby Iwaasa & Samuel Murray	11	11	11

Semifinals
1	(Mexico) Rodrigo Montoya & Sebastian Hernández	11	5	8	7
4	(Costa Rica) Andrés Acuña & Gabriel Garcia	7	11	11	11
3	(United States) Jake Bredenbeck & Sam Bredenbeck	11	13	8	9
2	(Canada) Coby Iwaasa & Samuel Murray	13	11	11	11

Final
4	(Costa Rica) Andrés Acuña & Gabriel Garcia	7	11	11	7	11
2	(Canada) Coby Iwaasa & Samuel Murray	11	7	6	11	1

== Women’s singles ==
=== Preliminary round ===
Group 1

Players	Pld	W	L	GW	GL	PW	PL	Place
(Argentina) Natalia Mendez	3	3	0	9	0	99	38	1
(Costa Rica) Larissa Faeth	3	2	1	6	4	82	95	2
(Chile) Paula Mansilla	3	1	2	4	6	91	81	3
(Cuba) Kylie Larduet	3	0	3	0	9	41	99	4

Group 2

Players	Pld	W	L	GW	GL	PW	PL	Place
(Dominican Republic) Merynanyelly Delgado	3	3	0	9	2	116	86	1
(Canada) Danielle Ramsay	3	2	1	6	6	106	109	2
(United States) Lexi York	3	1	2	7	6	121	114	3
(Guatemala) Andrea Reyes	3	0	3	1	9	76	110	4

Group 3

Players	Pld	W	L	GW	GL	PW	PL	Place
(Argentina) María José Vargas	3	3	0	9	1	105	47	1
(Chile) Carla Muñoz	3	2	1	7	3	101	53	2
(Costa Rica) Jimena Gomez	3	1	2	3	6	47	80	3
(Cuba) Samira Ferrer Marcilli	3	0	3	0	9	26	99	4

Group 4

Players	Pld	W	L	GW	GL	PW	PL	Place
(United States) Michelle Key	3	3	0	9	1	113	72	1
(Canada) Juliette Parent	3	2	1	6	5	99	95	2
(Dominican Republic) María Céspedes	3	1	2	4	6	101	102	3
(Guatemala) Jazmin Aguilar	3	0	3	2	9	76	120	4

=== Medal round ===
Quarterfinals
1	(Argentina) Natalia Mendez	4	10	11	11	11
8	(Canada) Danielle Ramsay	11	12	4	3	8
5	(Chile) Carla Muñoz	11	12	12
4	(United States) Michelle Key	8	10	10
3	(Argentina) Maria Jose Vargas	11	11	11
6	(Canada) Juliette Parent	4	5	3
7	(Costa Rica) Larissa Faeth	6	9	11	9
2	(Dominican Republic) Merynanyelly Delgado	11	11	5	11

Semifinals
1	(Argentina) Natalia Mendez	2	11	6	7
5	(Chile) Carla Muñoz	11	7	11	11
3	(Argentina) Maria Jose Vargas	11	11	11
2	(Dominican Republic) Merynanyelly Delgado	3	7	5

Final
5	(Chile) Carla Muñoz	1	3	5
3	(Argentina) Maria Jose Vargas	11	11	11

== Women’s doubles ==
=== Preliminary round ===
Group 1

Players	Pld	W	L	GW	GL	PW	PL	Place
(Argentina) Natalia Méndez & María José Vargas	3	3	0	9	0	103	61	1
(Dominican Republic) María Céspedes & Merynanyelly Delgado	3	2	1	6	5	105	95	2
(Chile) Carla Muñoz & Paula Javiera Mansilla Sid	3	1	2	5	6	111	111	3
(Canada) Marjolaine Parent & Danielle Ramsay	3	0	3	0	9	49	101	4

Group 2

Players	Pld	W	L	GW	GL	PW	PL	Place
(United States) Naomi Ros & Lexi York	3	3	0	9	2	119	71	1
(Guatemala) Anna Paul Aguilar Salvatierra & Andrea Gabriela Reyes Perez	3	2	1	8	5	128	108	2
(Costa Rica) Larissa Faeth & Jimena Gomez	3	1	2	5	6	90	98	3
(Cuba) Samira Ferrar Marcilli & Kylie Larduet	3	0	3	0	9	39	99	4

=== Medal round ===
Quarterfinals
1	(Argentina) Natalia Mendez & Maria Jose Vargas	11	11	11
8	(Cuba) Samira Ferrar Marcilli & Kylie Larduet	4	2	2
5	(Costa Rica) Larissa Faeth & Jimena Gomez	7	12	9	3
4	(Dominican Republic) María Céspedes & Merynanyelly Delgado	11	10	11	11
3	(Guatemala) Anna Paul Aguilar Salvatierra & Andrea Gabriela Reyes Perez	3	8	6
6	(Chile) Carla Muñoz & Paula Javiera Mansilla Sid	11	11	11
7	(Canada) Marjolaine Parent & Danielle Ramsay	7	4	3
2	(United States) Naomi Ros & Lexi York	11	11	11

Semifinals
1	(Argentina) Natalia Mendez & Maria Jose Vargas	11	11	11
4	(Dominican Republic) María Cespedes & Merynanyelly Delgado	6	4	5
3	(Chile) Carla Muñoz & Paula Javiera Mansilla Sid	5	11	11	12	1
2	(United States) Naomi Ros & Lexi York	11	9	9	14	11

Final
1	(Argentina) Natalia Mendez & Maria Jose Vargas	7	11	10	11	11
2	(United States) Naomi Ros & Lexi York	11	8	12	9	9

== Mixed doubles ==
Group 1

Players	Pld	W	L	GW	GL	PW	PL	Place
(Argentina) Gerson Miranda & Natalia Mendez	2	2	0	6	2	81	54	1
(Canada) Coby Iwaasa & Juliette Parent	2	1	1	5	4	81	72	2
(Guatemala) Andrea Martinez & Juan Salvatierra	2	0	2	1	6	39	75	3

Group 2

Players	Pld	W	L	GW	GL	PW	PL	Place
(Chile) Jaime Mansilla & Carla Muñoz	3	3	0	9	4	130	106	1
(United States) Sam Bredenbeck & Michelle Key	3	2	1	8	3	116	83	2
(Dominican Republic) Alejandra Jiménez & Diego Pimentel	3	1	2	5	6	102	105	3
(Cuba) Samira Ferrer Marcilli & Maikel Moyet	3	0	3	0	9	49	103	4

=== Medal Round ===
Quarterfinals
5	(Guatemala) Andrea Martinez & Juan Salvatierra	6	6	8
4	(Canada) Coby Iwaasa & Juliette Parent	11	11	11
3	(United States) Sam Bredenbeck & Michelle Key	13	11	11
6	(Dominican Republic) Alejandra Jiménez & Diego Pimentel	11	6	8
7	(Cuba) Samira Ferrer Marcilli & Maikel Moyet	4	4	7
2	(Chile) Carla Muñoz & Jaime Mansilla	11	11	11

Semifinals
1	(Argentina) Natalia Mendez & Gerson Miranda	9	11	11	11	7
4	(Canada) Coby Iwaasa & Juliette Parent	11	13	7	7	11
3	(United States) Sam Bredenbeck & Michelle Key	11	11	11	11
2	(Chile) Carla Muñoz & Jaime Mansilla	8	13	8	5

Final
4	(Canada) Coby Iwaasa & Juliette Parent	9	10	9
3	(United States) Sam Bredenbeck & Michelle Key	11	12	11

== Team Competitions ==
=== Men’s Team ===
First Round
9	Honduras
8	Cuba

Quarterfinals
Mexico	3	3
(Cuba) Cubas	0	0
Guatemala	2	3	0
Canada	2	1	3
(United States) USA	3	3
Chile	0	1
Dominican Republic	0	0
Costa Rica	3	3

Semifinals
Mexico	3	0	3
Canada	2	3	0
(United States) USA	3	0	3
Costa Rica	2	3	1

Final
Mexico	1	3	3
(United States) USA	3	0	0

Semi-finals

29 March 2024	MEX	2–1	Canada

Sebastian Hernández	3–2	Coby Iwaasa	11–9, 7-11, 6–11, 16-14, 11-4
Sebastian Hernández / Rodrigo Montoya	0–3	Coby Iwaasa / Samual Murray	3-11, 7-11, 7-11
Rodrigo Montoya	3–0	Kurtis Cullen	11-7, 11-8, 11-6

29 March 2024	USA	2–1	Costa Rica

Charlie Pratt	3–2	Gabriel Garcia	11–7, 7-11, 11-5, 7-11, 11-9
Jake Bredenbeck / Sam Bredenbeck	0–3	Andrés Acuña / Gabriel Garcia	11-7, 11-9, 11-8
Jake Bredenbeck	3–1	Andrés Acuña	6-11, 11-4, 11-9, 11-5

Final

30 March 2024	MEX	2–1	United States

Sebastian Hernández	1–3	Charlie Pratt	8-11, 14-12, 6-11, 8-11
Rodrigo Montoya	3–0	Jake Bredenbeck	11–4, 11–6, 11–3
Sebastian Hernández & Rodrigo Montoya	3–0	Jake Bredenbeck & Sam Bredenbeck	11-9, 11-7, 11-2

=== Women’s Team ===
Quarterfinals
Argentina	3	3
Cuba	0	0
Canada	1	2
(United States) USA	3	3
Dominican Republic	1	3	3
Costa Rica	3	0	0
Guatemala	3	1	1
Chile	1	3	3

Semifinals
Argentina	3	3
(United States) USA	0	1
Dominican Republic	3	3
Chile	1	1

Final
Argentina	3	3
Dominican Republic	0	1

Semi-finals

29 March 2024	ARG	0–2	United States

Natalia Mendez	3–1	Lexi York	11–8, 11-5, 9-11, 11-5
Natalia Mendez / Maria Jose Vargas	3–0	Naomi Ros / Lexi York	11–4, 11-5, 11–5

29 March 2024	DOM	2–0	Chile

Alejandra Jimenez	3–1	Paula Mansilla	11–5, 11–3, 6-11, 11-8
Maria Cespedes / Merynanyelly Delgado	3–1	Paula Mansilla / Carla Muñoz	11-7, 8-11, 11-4, 11-6

Final

30 March 2024	ARG	2–0	Dominican Republic

Natalia Mendez	3–0	Alejandra Jimenez	11–7, 11–4, 11–4
Maria Jose Vargas	3–1	Merynanyelly Delgado	11–4, 11–9, 8-11, 11–2
