= 2024 Racquetball World Championships – Men's Singles =

Men’s singles at the XXII Racquetball World Championships
- Location: San Antonio, Texas, United States
- Dates: August 24–31, 2024

Medalists
gold medal	(United States) Daniel De La Rosa
silver medal	(United States) Jake Bredenbeck
bronze medal	(Bolivia) Carlos Keller (Mexico) Eduardo Portillo

The International Racquetball Federation's 22nd Racquetball World Championships were held in San Antonio, Texas, United States from August 24–31, 2024. This was the first time that Worlds was held in the USA since 1996, when it was held in Phoenix, Arizona.

The 2024 World Championships used a best-of-five games match format, with each game played to 11 points, win by 2, with rally scoring.

Daniel De La Rosa, playing for the United States, won men's singles for the first time by defeating fellow American Jake Bredenbeck in the final, 11–9, 11–9, 1–11, 11–4. De La Rosa was representing the US at Worlds for the first time, having previously represented Mexico. He was the 9th American to win men's singles at Worlds, and the first since Alejandro Landa in 2021.

== Tournament format ==
The 2024 World Championships used a two-stage format to determine the World Champions. Initially, players competed in separate groups over three days. The results were used to seed players for the medal round, with only the top two players from each group advancing to the medal round.

== Men's singles ==
=== Preliminary round ===
Group 1

Players	Pld	W	L	GW	GL	PW	PL	Place
(Bolivia) Conrrado Moscoso	2	2	0	6	0	66	23	1
(Japan) Shoji Mochino	2	1	1	3	4	46	53	2
(Colombia) Orlando Josué Huyke	2	0	2	0	6	31	67	3

Group 2

Players	Pld	W	L	GW	GL	PW	PL	Points
(United States) Daniel De La Rosa	3	3	0	9	0	99	33	1
(Japan) Michimune Kono	3	2	1	6	3	79	74	2
(Colombia) Mario Andrés Huyke	3	1	2	3	7	76	106	3
(Denmark) Allan Kristensen	3	0	3	1	9	70	111	4

Group 3

Players	Pld	W	L	GW	GL	PW	PL	Points
(Bolivia) Carlos Keller	3	3	0	9	2	114	79	1
(Argentina) Gerson Miranda Martínez	3	2	1	7	3	105	79	2
(Dominican Republic) Ramón de León	3	1	2	4	6	87	102	3
(Eritrea) Woody Clouse	3	0	3	0	9	54	100	4

Group 4

Players	Pld	W	L	GW	GL	PW	PL	Points
(United States) Jake Bredenbeck	3	3	0	9	0	99	37	1
(Canada) Trevor Webb	3	2	1	6	4	94	71	2
(South Korea) Namwoo Lee	3	1	2	4	6	78	91	3
(Italy) Carlo Papini	3	0	3	0	9	27	99	4

Group 5

Players	Pld	W	L	GW	GL	PW	PL	Points
(Argentina) Diego Garcia	3	3	0	9	2	116	72	1
(Costa Rica) Andrés Acuña	3	2	1	8	3	111	75	2
(Germany) Marcel Lunsmann	3	1	2	3	8	78	116	3
(Dominican Republic) Diego Pimentel	3	0	3	2	9	77	119	4

Group 6

Players	Pld	W	L	GW	GL	PW	PL	Points
(Mexico) Andree Parrilla	3	3	0	9	1	109	48	1
(Canada) Kurtis Cullen	3	2	1	7	3	95	73	2
(South Korea) Gunhee Lee	3	1	2	3	7	71	100	3
(India) Praveen Gorthy	3	0	3	1	9	54	108	4

Group 7

Players	Pld	W	L	GW	GL	PW	PL	Points
(Costa Rica) Gabriel García	3	3	0	9	2	114	85	1
(Guatemala) José Cáceres	3	2	1	6	4	98	85	2
(Germany) Ernesto Ruiz	3	1	2	4	8	110	126	3
(Chile) Vineet Singh	3	0	3	4	9	108	134	4

Group 8

Players	Pld	W	L	GW	GL	PW	PL	Points
(Mexico) Eduardo Portillo	3	3	0	9	0	99	55	1
(India) Vineet Singh	3	1	2	4	6	90	107	2
(Ecuador) Esteban De Janon	3	1	2	3	6	81	92	3
(Republic of Ireland) Johnny O’keeney	3	1	2	3	7	90	107	4

Group 9

Players	Pld	W	L	GW	GL	PW	PL	Points
(Ecuador) José Daniel Ugalde	3	3	0	9	4	135	106	1
(Guatemala) Juan Salvatierra	3	2	1	8	3	119	80	2
(Chile) Jaime Mansilla	3	1	2	5	6	89	107	3
(Republic of Ireland) Patrick Hanley	3	0	3	0	9	49	99	4

=== Medal round ===
Round of 32
17	(Japan) Michimune Kono	11	3	11	4	9
16	(Canada) Trevor Webb	9	11	7	11	11
15	(Argentina) Gerson Miranda Martinez	3
18	(Japan) Shoji Mochino	2 inj fft

Round of 16
1	(Bolivia) Conrrado Moscoso	11	10	11	14
16	(Canada) Trevor Webb	6	12	8	12
9	(Ecuador) José Daniel Ugalde	7	7	3
8	(Mexico) Eduardo Portillo	11	11	11
5	(Argentina) Diego García	11	11	11
12	(Guatemala) José Cáceres	4	6	0
13	(Canada) Kurtis Cullen	8	1	4
4	(United States) Jake Bredenbeck	11	11	11
3	(Bolivia) Carlos Keller	7	11	11	11
14	(Costa Rica) Andrés Acuña	11	9	6	9
11	(India) Vineet Singh	4	12	7
6	(Mexico) Andree Parrilla	11	14	11
7	(Costa Rica) Gabriel Garcia	11	11	11
10	(Guatemala) Juan Salvatierra	7	6	6
7	(Argentina) Gerson Miranda Martinez	6	7	11	11
10	(United States) Daniel De La Rosa	11	11	5	13

Quarterfinals
1	(Bolivia) Conrrado Moscoso	7	15	8	11	6
8	(Mexico) Eduardo Portillo	11	13	11	5	11
5	(Argentina) Diego García	11	6	6	11	9
4	(United States) Jake Bredenbeck	8	11	11	8	11
3	(Bolivia) Carlos Keller	8	13	12	11
6	(Mexico) Andree Parrilla	11	11	10	8
7	(Costa Rica) Gabriel García	6	3	11
2	(United States) Daniel De La Rosa	11	11	11

Semifinals
1	(Mexico) Eduardo Portillo	8	10	12
13	(United States) Jake Bredenbeck	11	12	14
3	(Bolivia) Carlos Keller	9	5	9
2	(United States) Daniel De La Rosa	11	11	11

Final
4	(United States) Jake Bredenbeck	9	9	11	4
2	(United States) Daniel De La Rosa	11	11	1	11
