= 2024 Racquetball World Championships – Men's doubles =

Men's doubles at the XXII Racquetball World Championships
- Location: San Antonio, Texas, United States
- Dates: August 24–31, 2024

Medalists
gold medal	(Canada) Coby Iwaasa & Samuel Murray
silver medal	(Mexico) Andree Parrilla & Eduardo Portillo
bronze medal	(Bolivia) Kadim Carrasco & Conrrado Moscoso (United States) Adam Manilla & Sebastian Fernandez

The International Racquetball Federation's 22nd Racquetball World Championships were held in San Antonio, Texas, USA from August 24–31, 2024. This was the first time Worlds was held in the US since 1996, when it was held in Phoenix, Arizona.

The 2024 World Championships used a best of five games match format with each game to 11 points, win by 2, with rally scoring.

Canadians Coby Iwaasa and Samuel Murray defeated Mexicans Andree Parrilla and Eduardo Portillo in the final, 11–5, 6–11, 11–8, 4–11, 11–6, to win men's doubles, which was a first for both them and Canada. It was also Canada's first World Championship since 2006, when Christie Huczek won women's singles.

== Tournament format ==
The 2024 World Championships used a two-stage format to determine the World Champions. Initially, players competed in separate groups over three days. The results were used to seed players for the medal round, with only the top two players from each group advancing to the medal round.

== Men’s doubles ==
=== Preliminary round ===
Group 1

Players	Pld	W	L	GW	GL	PW	PL	Place
(Mexico) Andree Parrilla & Eduardo Portillo	3	3	0	9	2	119	96	1
(Argentina) Diego Garcia & Gerson Miranda Martinez	3	2	1	6	5	104	93	2
(Chile) Johan Igor & Alan Natera	3	1	2	7	6	120	119	3
(Japan) Ayako Hanashi & Saki Kokido	3	0	3	0	9	64	99	4

Group 2

Players	Pld	W	L	GW	GL	PW	PL	Place
(Bolivia) Kadim Carrasco & Conrrado Moscoso	3	3	0	9	3	129	90	1
(Costa Rica) Andrés Acuña & Gabriel Garcia	3	2	1	8	4	111	102	2
(Guatemala) Edwin Galicia & Juan Salvatierra	3	1	2	5	6	102	104	3
(Dominican Republic) Diego Pimentel & Jean Marco Pumarol	3	0	3	0	9	53	99	4

Group 3

Players	Pld	W	L	GW	GL	PW	PL	Place
(United States) Adam Manilla & Sebastian Fernandez	3	3	0	9	2	120	71	1
(Bolivia) Juan Francisco Cueva & Jose Daniel Ugalde	3	2	1	8	3	108	88	2
(Japan) Yuki Nakano & Hiroshi Shimizu	3	1	2	3	6	72	83	3
(Republic of Ireland) Johnny O’keeney & Scott Young	3	0	3	0	9	41	99	3

Group 4

Players	Pld	W	L	GW	GL	PW	PL	Place
(Canada) Coby Iwaasa & Samuel Murray	3	3	0	9	0	99	31	1
(South Korea) Gunhee Lee & Namwoo Lee	3	2	1	6	4	85	88	2
(India) Alok Mehta & Tejas Veer	3	1	2	4	7	82	107	3
(Colombia) Mario Andrés Huyke & Orlando José Huyke	3	0	3	1	9	71	111	4

=== Medal round ===
Quarterfinals
1	(Mexico) Andree Parrilla & Eduardo Portillo	11	11	11
8	(Argentina) Diego Garcia & Gerson Miranda Martinez	9	9	3
5	(South Korea) Gunhee Lee & Namwoo Lee	4	5	4
4	(United States) Adam Manilla & Sebastian Fernandez	11	11	11
3	(Canada) Coby Iwaasa & Samuel Murray	11	11	11
6	(Ecuador) Juan Francisco Cueva & Jose Daniel Ugalde	0	5	9
7	(Costa Rica) Andrés Acuña & Gabriel Garcia	3	6	9
2	(Bolivia) Kadim Carrasco & Conrrado Moscoso	11	11	11

Semifinals
1	(Mexico) Andree Parrilla & Eduardo Portillo	11	2	11	12
4	(United States) Adam Manilla & Sebastian Fernandez	4	11	7	10
3	(Canada) Coby Iwaasa & Samuel Murray	5	12	11	8	11
2	(Bolivia) Kadim Carrasco & Conrrado Moscoso	11	10	7	11	8

Final
1	(Mexico) Andree Parrilla & Eduardo Portillo	5	11	8	11	6
2	(Canada) Coby Iwaasa & Samuel Murray	11	6	11	4	11
