= 2024 Racquetball World Championships =

Racquetball competition in USA

- XXII Racquetball World Championships: 2024 -
| Host | (United States) San Antonio |
| Dates | August 24–31, 2024 |
- Men's singles
| Gold | (United States) Daniel De La Rosa |
| Silver | (United States) Jake Bredenbeck |
| Bronze | (Bolivia) Carlos Keller (Mexico) Eduardo Portillo |
- Women's singles
| Gold | (Mexico) Paola Longoria |
| Silver | (Guatemala) Gabriela Martínez |
| Bronze | (Argentina) Maria Jose Vargas (Chile) Carla Muñoz |
- Men's doubles
| Gold | (Canada) Coby Iwaasa & Samuel Murray |
| Silver | (Mexico) Andree Parrilla & Eduardo Portillo |
| Bronze | (Bolivia) Kadim Carrasco & Conrrado Moscoso (United States) Adam Manilla & Sebastian Fernandez |
- Women's doubles
| Gold | (Mexico) Alexandra Herrera & Montserrat Mejia |
| Silver | (Argentina) Maria Jose Vargas & Natalia Mendez |
| Bronze | (Guatemala) María Renée Rodríguez & Gabriela Martínez (Canada) Frédérique Lambert & Juliette Parent |
- Mixed doubles
| Gold | (United States) Daniel De La Rosa & Hollie Scott |
| Silver | (Mexico) Javier Mar & Montserrat Mejia |
| Bronze | (Guatemala) Edwin Galicia & Gabriela Martinez (Bolivia) Angélica Barrios & Conrrado Moscoso |

The International Racquetball Federation's 22nd Racquetball World Championships were held at the Thousand Oaks Family YMCA in San Antonio, Texas, United States from August 24–31, 2024.

The 2024 World Championships were also the qualifying event for the 2025 World Games in Chengdu, China.

== Tournament format ==
The 2024 World Championships had an individual competition (men's and women's singles and doubles as well as mixed doubles), as well as a team competition. The individual competition used a two-stage format to determine the World Champions. Initially, players competed in separate groups over three days. The results were used to seed players for an elimination round.

The individual events were followed by a team competition with countries competing head to head in best of three matches: two singles matches and a doubles match. In the team competition countries faced off in men's and women's divisions with a best of three matches format: two singles matches and a doubles match. Order of the matches varied, and if one team won the first two matches, the third was not played.

== Medal table ==
* Host nation (United States)

| Rank | Nation | Gold | Silver | Bronze | Total |
|---|---|---|---|---|---|
| 1 | Mexico (MEX) | 3 | 2 | 2 | 7 |
| 2 | United States (USA)* | 3 | 1 | 2 | 6 |
| 3 | Canada (CAN) | 1 | 1 | 1 | 3 |
| 4 | Argentina (ARG) | 0 | 2 | 1 | 3 |
| 5 | Guatemala (GUA) | 0 | 1 | 2 | 3 |
| 6 | Bolivia (BOL) | 0 | 0 | 4 | 4 |
| 7 | Chile (CHI) | 0 | 0 | 1 | 1 |
| 7 | Costa Rica (CRC) | 0 | 0 | 1 | 1 |
| Totals (8 entries) | | 7 | 7 | 14 | 28 |

== Individual events ==
=== Men's singles ===
Semifinals
(United States) Jake Bredenbeck | 11 | 12 | 14
(Mexico) Eduardo Portillo | 8 | 10 | 12
(Bolivia) Carlos Keller | 9 | 5 | 9
(United States) Daniel De La Rosa | 11 | 11 | 11

Final
(United States) Jake Bredenbeck | 9 | 9 | 11 | 4
(United States) Daniel De La Rosa | 11 | 11 | 1 | 11

=== Women's singles ===
Semifinals
(Mexico) Paola Longoria | 11 | 16 | 9 | 11
(Argentina) Maria Jose Vargas | 9 | 14 | 11 | 5
(Guatemala) Gabriela Martínez | 9 | 11 | 11 | 11
(Chile) Carla Muñoz | 11 | 7 | 5 | 4

Final
(Mexico) Paola Longoria | 11 | 6 | 11 | 12
(Guatemala) Gabriela Martínez | 5 | 11 | 9 | 10

=== Men's doubles ===
Semifinals
(Mexico) Andree Parrilla & Eduardo Portillo | 11 | 2 | 11 | 12
(United States) Adam Manilla & Sebastian Fernandez | 4 | 11 | 7 | 10
(Canada) Coby Iwaasa & Samuel Murray | 5 | 12 | 11 | 8 | 11
(Bolivia) Kadim Carrasco & Conrrado Moscoso | 11 | 10 | 7 | 11 | 8

Final
(Mexico) Andree Parrilla & Eduardo Portillo | 5 | 11 | 8 | 11 | 6
(Canada) Coby Iwaasa & Samuel Murray | 11 | 6 | 11 | 4 | 11

=== Women's doubles ===
Semifinals
(Mexico) Alexandra Herrera & Montserrat Mejia | 11 | 11 | 8 | 9 | 11
(Guatemala) Gabriela Martínez & María Renée Rodríguez | 2 | 4 | 11 | 11 | 3
(Canada) Frédérique Lambert & Juliette Parent | 9 | 10 | 7
(Argentina) Maria Jose Vargas & Natalia Méndez | 11 | 12 | 11

Final
(Mexico) Alexandra Herrera & Montserrat Mejia | 11 | 9 | 15 | 7 | 11
(Argentina) Maria Jose Vargas & Natalia Méndez | 3 | 11 | 13 | 11 | 7

=== Mixed doubles ===
Semifinals
(Mexico) Javier Mar & Montserrat Mejia | 11 | 9 | 10 | 11 | 11
(Bolivia) Angélica Barrios & Conrrado Moscoso | 6 | 11 | 12 | 7 | 9
(United States) Daniel De La Rosa & Hollie Scott | 10 | 14 | 11 | 11
(Guatemala) Edwin Galicia & Gabriela Martinez | 12 | 12 | 7 | 8

Final
(Mexico) Javier Mar & Montserrat Mejia | 9 | 12 | 9 | 12
(United States) Daniel De La Rosa & Hollie Scott | 11 | 10 | 11 | 14

== Team events ==
The team competition occurred after the individual events, and results from those events were used to seed countries for the team event. The team competition was a best of three matches: two singles and a doubles match. The order of the matches varied by round.

=== Men's team ===
First round
1 | (United States) USA
16 | Germany
9 | Ecuador
8 | Japan
5 | Costa Rica
12 | Chile
13 | Colombia
4 | Argentina
3 | Bolivia
14 | Dominican Republic
11 | (South Korea) Korea
6 | Canada
7 | Guatemala
10 | India
15 | (Republic of Ireland) Ireland
2 | Mexico

Quarterfinals
(United States) USA
Ecuador
Costa Rica
Argentina
Bolivia
Canada
Guatemala
Mexico

Semifinals
(United States) USA | 0 | 2
Costa Rica | 3 | 3
Canada | 0 | 3 | 0
Mexico | 3 | 2 | 3

Final
(United States) USA | 1 | 3 | 3
Canada | 3 | 1 | 1

Semi-finals

| 30 August 2024 | United States | 2–0 | Costa Rica |

Jake Bredenbeck | 3–1 | Gabriel Garcia | 13-15, 11-6, 11-7, 11-7
Adam Manilla / Sebastian Fernandez | 3–2 | Andrés Acuña / Gabriel Garcia | 6-11, 11-4, 6-11, 11-9, 11-6

| 30 August 2024 | Mexico | 1–2 | Canada |

Javier Mar | 3–0 | Samuel Murray | 11-7, 11-5, 11-5
Andree Parrilla / Eduardo Portillo | 1–3 | Coby Iwaasa / Samuel Murray | 9-11, 11-7, 11-6, 11-5
Andree Parrilla | 2–3 | Coby Iwaasa | 5-11, 9-11, 12-10, 11-4, 12-10

Final

| 31 August 2024 | United States | 2–1 | Canada |

Jake Bredenbeck | 1–3 | Samuel Murray | 7-11, 11-7, 11-5, 11-8
Daniel De La Rosa | 3–1 | Coby Iwaasa | 9-11, 11-3, 11-9, 11-6
Adam Manilla / Sebastian Fernandez | 3–1 | Coby Iwaasa / Samuel Murray | 12-10, 11-4, 6-11, 11-9

=== Women's team ===
First round
9 | Ecuador
8 | Canada
5 | Guatemala
12 | (Republic of Ireland) Ireland
13 | Japan
4 | (United States) USA
11 | Costa Rica
6 | Chile
7 | Dominican Republic
10 | (South Korea) Korea

Quarterfinals
Mexico
Canada
Guatemala
(United States) USA
Bolivia
Chile
DOM Dominican Republic
Argentina

Semifinals
Mexico | 3 | 3
USA | 0 | 0
Bolivia | 3 | 0 | 1
Argentina | 0 | 3 | 3

Final
Mexico | 3 | 3
Argentina | 1 | 1

Semi-finals

| 30 August 2024 | Mexico | 2–0 | United States |

Montserrat Mejia | 3–0 | Michelle Key | 11-3, 11-6, 12-10
Alexandra Herrera / Montserrat Mejia | 3–0 | Kelani Lawrence / Hollie Scott | 11-5, 11-9, 11-6

| 30 August 2024 | Bolivia | 1–2 | Argentina |

Angélica Barrios | 3–0 | Valeria Centellas | 11-4, 11-8, 11-8
Angélica Barrios / Jenny Daza | 0–3 | Maria Jose Vargas / Natalia Mendez | 11-8, 12-10, 11-7
Camila Rivero | 1–3 | Maria Jose Vargas | 11-6, 9-11, 11-2, 11-5

Final

| 31 August 2024 | Mexico | 2–0 | Argentina |

Montserrat Mejia | 3–1 | Valeria Centellas | 11-9, 8-11, 11-3, 11-8
Paola Longoria | 3–1 | Maria Jose Vargas | 12-14, 11–7, 11–9, 11–4
