= Jake Bredenbeck =

USA racquetball player (born 1991)

Personal information
- Nationality: American
- Born: September 27, 1991 (age 35) Maplewood, Minnesota, U.S.
- Height: 6 ft 2 in (188 cm)

Sport
- Sport: Racquetball
- College team: University of Colorado – Pueblo

Achievements and titles
- National finals: 1st Singles – 2014, 2015, 2019; 1st Doubles – 2016
- Highest world ranking: 3rd
Medal record
Men's Racquetball
Representing United States
Pan American Games
Bronze medal – third place	2019 Lima	Team
Silver medal – second place	2015 Toronto	Team
World Championships
Silver medal – second place	2024 San Antonio	Singles
Gold medal – first place	2024 San Antonio	Team
Silver medal – second place	2016 Cali	Doubles
The World Games
Gold medal – first place	2025 Chengdu	Mixed Doubles
Pan American Championships
Bronze medal – third place	2026 Guatemala City	Doubles
Bronze medal – third place	2026 Guatemala City	Team
Bronze medal – third place	2025 Guatemala City	Doubles
Silver medal – second place	2025 Guatemala City	Team
Bronze medal – third place	2024 Guatemala City	Singles
Bronze medal – third place	2024 Guatemala City	Doubles
Silver medal – second place	2024 Guatemala City	Team
Silver medal – second place	2017 San José	Doubles
Silver medal – second place	2016 San Luis Potosi	Singles
Bronze medal – third place	2016 San Luis Potosi	Doubles
Silver medal – second place	2015 Santo Domingo	Singles

Jake Bredenbeck (born September 27, 1991) is an American racquetball player. Bredenbeck is the current World Games champion in Mixed Doubles, winning the title with Naomi Ros in Chengdu, China. He was part of Team USA that won gold at the 2024 Racquetball World Championships in San Antonio, Texas. Bredenbeck is a four time USA Racquetball (USAR) National Champion: three times in Men's Singles and once in Men's Doubles. He's also won on the International Racquetball Tour.

== Junior and college years ==
Bredenbeck played extensively as a junior and with some success. In 2004, he won Boys U12 Doubles with Taylor Knoth, who he would play doubles with throughout his junior years. They repeated as champions in 2006, when they won Boys U14. That year Bredenbeck lost in the Round of 16 of Boys U14 Singles.

The US Junior Doubles title qualified Bredenbeck and Knoth for the US Junior Team, so they played Boys U14 at the 2006 International Racquetball Federation (IRF) World Junior Championships in Tempe, Arizona, where they finished 2nd.

They won a 3rd USA junior doubles title the next year, when they won Boys U16 Doubles. Bredenbeck and Knoth faced off in the quarterfinals of Boys U16 Singles in 2007 with Knoth coming out on top.

With the doubles win, Bredenbeck and Knoth again went to the IRF World Juniors in 2007 in Cochabamba, Bolivia, where they were runners up in Boys U16 Doubles, just as they were the year before in U14.

They were going for a 3rd straight junior doubles title at the 2008 USAR Junior Championships, but lost in the Boys U16 Doubles final. They faced off again in singles that year with Knoth the winner, 15–9, 15–9, which was a semi-final match, so Bredenbeck played for 3rd place but lost to Nick Montalbano.

In 2009, Bredenbeck lost in the quarterfinals of Boys U18 Singles to eventual champion Jose Rojas. Rojas also thwarted Bredenbeck in Boys U18 Doubles, as he and Jose Serrano defeated Bredenbeck and Knoth, 13–15, 15–8, 11–6.

In his final year of juniors, Bredenbeck lost in quarterfinals of Boys U18 Singles to Dylan Reid, 15–6, 9–15, 11–9, in 2010, and he and Knoth lost U18 doubles final to Bradley Kirch and Nick Montalbano 15–6, 15–11.

Bredenbeck went on to play racquetball at the University of Colorado at Pueblo, so he competed at the USA Racquetball Intercollegiate Championships for four years. In 2010, he won won No. 4 singles and No. 3 doubles with Jeremy McGlothin. In 2011, Bredenbeck won No. 5 singles and No. 3 doubles with Tyler Stone.

Bredenbeck again won his singles division at Intercollegiates in 2012, which was the No. 4 division. He also won No. 2 doubles that year with Felipe Camacho. Bredenbeck closed out his college career by winning singles for the fourth time in as many years at Intercollegiates. This time he played in the No. 2 division. In doubles, Bredenbeck played in the No. 1 division and came 2nd with Nick Montalbano.

== 2012–2015 – Beginning to play the pro tour and for Team USA ==
Bredenbeck's first appearance at the US Open Racquetball Championships was in 2012, when he finished in the Round of 64, losing to Alejandro Herrera, 11–1, 3–11, 12–10, 11–2. He played the US Open again in 2013, beating Fernando Rios, 5–11, 11–0, 11–7, 11–9, in the Round of 64, and then losing to Tony Carson, 11–5, 6–11, 11–5, 12–10, in the Round of 32.

Bredenbeck played on the World Racquetball Tour for five years: 2014–2018. He was ranked in the top 4 in four of those five years, finishing #1 in its last year, 2018. Across those years, Bredenbeck reached 17 finals and won 5 titles. His wins were over Rodrigo Montoya twice, Polo Gutierrez twice and Alejandro Cardona.

Bredenbeck paired with Charlie Pratt for the 2014 USAR Doubles Championships, and they finished 4th. They lost in the semi-finals to Rocky Carson and Jose Rojas, 15–4, 14–15, 11–7, and then lost the 3rd place match to Jansen Allen and Tony Carson, 15–11, 12–15, 11–6.

Bredenbeck was the 5th seed in his first appearance at the USA National Singles Championships in 2014, but he went on to win the title, beating top seed Marco Rojas, 15–14, 11–15, 11–9, in the semi-finals and David Horn, 15–14, 15–12, in the final.

His singles title led to Bredenbeck being selected to play for the US Team for the first time at the 2014 Pan American Sports Organization Festival in Guadalajara, Mexico, where he played both singles and doubles. In singles, he lost to Mexican Alvaro Beltran in the semi-finals, 15–4, 11–15, 11–9. In doubles, Bredenbeck and Jose Diaz lost in the final to Beltran and Javier Moreno, 15–14, 15–7. In the semi-finals, they beat Fernando Rios and Jose Daniel Ugalde of Ecuador, 15–10, 15–8, and defeated Sebastian Franco and Alejandro Herrera, 7–15, 15–5, 11–10.

Bredenbeck played at the 2015 USAR Doubles Championships with Charlie Pratt, and they finished 4th for a second year. This time they lost to Ben Croft and Thomas Fuhrmann, 15–11, 7–15, 11–7, in the semi-finals, and then lost the 3rd place match to Jose Diaz and Marco Rojas, 10–15, 15–8, 11–8.

Bredenbeck was the silver medalist in Men's Singles at the 2015 Pan American Championships in Santo Domingo, Dominican Republic. He reached the final by defeating Colombian Sebastian Franco, 13–15, 15–7, 11–10, in the quarterfinals, and Bolivian Carlos Keller, 15–13, 15–13, in the semi-finals, but lost the final to fellow American Jose Diaz, 15–7, 15–5.

In 2015, Bredenbeck successfully defended his USAR Singles Championship. He defeated Marco Rojas, 15–8, 15–11, in the final to win 2015 title. In the semi-finals, Bredenbeck beat Adam Manilla, 15–12, 15–13.

His US Singles title led to Bredenbeck being selected for Team USA for the 2015 Pan American Games. In Men's Singles, he lost to Canadian Coby Iwaasa, 15–4, 15–9, in the Round of 16. But in the Men's Team event Bredenbeck earned a silver medal, as the USA got to the final by defeating Canada in the semi-finals, but lost the final to Mexico.

At the 2015 US Open, Bredenbeck and Jose Diaz reached the finals of IRT Doubles, losing to Ben Croft and Kane Waselenchuk, 15–0, 15–5. They reached the final by defeating Jansen Allen and Charlie Pratt in the semi-finals, 15–10, 15–12. In singles, he defeated Pratt in the Round of 32, 9–11, 11–5, 6–11, 11–3, 11–2, but lost to Marco Rojas, 9–11, 11–2, 11–7, 11–5, in the Round of 16.

== 2016–2020 – Playing the IRT full time ==
He began to play the International Racquetball Tour full time in the 2015–16 season, as he played 8 of the 14 events reaching one semi-final and one quarterfinal resulting in a final ranking of 13.

Bredenbeck won the 2016 USAR National Doubles Championship with Jose Diaz. They beat Jansen Allen and Rocky Carson in the final, 15–14, 15–11, and reached the final with a win over brothers Marco Rojas and Jose Rojas. At the 2016 USAR National Singles Championship, Bredenbeck lost to Diaz in the semi-finals, 15–10, 15–12.

At the 2016 Pan American Championships, Bredenbeck played both singles and doubles, and reached the podium in both divisions. In singles, he reached the final by defeating Canadian Samuel Murray, 15–1, 13–15, 11–8, in the quarterfinals, and Mexican Javier Mar, 15–8, 14–15, 11–6, in the semi-finals, but lost the final to Mexican Daniel De La Rosa, 15–2, 15–1. In doubles he and David Horn lost in the semi-finals to Ecuadorians Fernando Rios and Jose Daniel Ugalde, 9–15, 15–1, 11–4.

Bredenbeck was on Team USA for the 2016 World Championships in Cali, Colombia, where he played Men's doubles with Jose Diaz. They defeated Bolivians Kadim Carrasco and Carlos Keller, 15–14, 8–15, 11–8, in the semi-finals, but lost to Mexicans Alvaro Beltran and Javier Moreno, 15–12, 15–9.

At the 2016 US Open, Bredenbeck got to the quarterfinals for the first time by defeating Javier Mar in the Round of 16, 11–2, 11–5, 4–11, 12–10, but in the quarters he lost to Daniel De La Rosa, 8–11, 11–1, 11–5, injury forfeit. In doubles, he and Jose Diaz defeated Sebastian Franco and Mario Mercado in the quarterfinals, 15–13, 10–15, 11–7, but lost to De La Rosa and Edson Martinez, 15–3, 15–12, in the semi-finals.

Bredenbeck was a quarterfinalist at both US championships in 2017. At the 2017 USAR Doubles Championships, he and Anthony Herrera lost in the quarters to Robert Collins and David Horn, 15–10, 15–6. Then at the 2017 USAR Singles Championships, Bredenbeck lost to Jose Diaz, 6–15, 15–12, 11–6, in the quarters.

Bredenbeck played doubles with David Horn at the 2017 Pan American Championships in San José, Costa Rica, where they reached the final by defeating Roland Keller and Conrrado Moscoso, 15–12, 15–7, in the semi-finals, but lost the final to Polo Gutierrez and Alejandro Landa, 10–15, 15–8, 11–4.

At the 2017 US Open, Bredenbeck came back from two games down to defeat Jose Diaz in the Round of 32, 9–11, 8–11, 11–9, 11–9, 11–1, and then lost in the Round of 16 to Kane Waselenchuk, 11–3, 11–4, 11–4. In doubles, he and Diaz beat Kadim Carrasco and Carlos Keller, 15–5, 15–5, but lost to Jansen Allen and Samuel Murray, 10–15, 15–7, 11–6.

Bredenbeck played with Jose Diaz at the 2018 USA Racquetball Doubles Championships, and they finished 3rd. They lost to David Horn and Mauro Rojas in the quarterfinals, 15–10, 5–15, 11–8. But they defeated Adam Manilla and Nicolas Riffel for 3rd, 15–10, 14–15, 11–4. At the 2018 USAR Singles Championships, Bredenbeck lost to Jose Rojas, 12–15, 15–10, 11–9, in the quarters.

Bredenbeck lost in the Round of 16 at the 2018 US Open to Alejandro Landa, 15–9, 15–1, but reached the semi-finals in doubles with Jose Diaz by defeating Andrés Acuña and Felipe Camacho in the Round of 16, 15–13, 11–15, 11–8, and Sebastian Franco and Mario Mercado in the quarterfinals, 14–15, 15–11, 11–10. They lost to Ben Croft and Kane Waselenchuk, 15–13, 15–6, in the semi-finals.

Bredenbeck and Jose Diaz were runners-up at the 2019 USAR Doubles Championships, as they lost to Rocky Carson and Charlie Pratt, 15–8, 5–15, 11–7, in the final. They defeated David Horn and Mauro Rojas, 15–9, 15–11, in the semi-finals.

Bredenbeck played at the 2019 Pan American Championships in Barranquilla, Colombia, where he and Mauro Rojas lost to Canadians Coby Iwaasa and Samuel Murray, 13–15, 15–1, 11–7, in the quarterfinals.

Bredenbeck won a 3rd USA Racquetball Singles Championships in 2019. He defeated Robert Collins, 15–4, 15–2, in the quarterfinals, Adam Manilla, 15–12, 7–15, 11–5, in the semi-finals, and David Horn, 15–1, 15–1, in the final. It was his first win since back to back titles in 2014 and 2015.

At the 2019 Pan American Games, Bredenbeck played singles and in the team event. In Men's Singles, he lost to Colombian Mario Mercado, 15–8, 8–15, 11–8, in the quarterfinals. In the Men's Team event, the USA beat Costa Rica in the quarterfinals, but lost to Bolivia in the semi-finals, resulting in a bronze medal.

Bredenbeck lost in the Round of 16 at the 2019 US Open to Daniel De La Rosa, 15–10, 15–11, after beating Jansen Allen in the Round of 32, 15–12, 15–9. He won again played doubles with Jose Diaz, and they lost to Kadim Carrasco and Carlos Keller in the Round of 16, 6–15, 15–9, 11–8.

At the 2020 USA Racquetball Doubles Championships, Bredenbeck and Jose Diaz defeated David Horn and Eric Garcia in the quarterfinals, 11–15, 15–5, 11–3, but lost to Alejandro Landa and Sudsy Monchik in the semi-finals, 15–13, 4–15, 11–9.

In the 2019–20 IRT season, Bredenbeck got to his 2nd semi-final and reached the top 10 for the first time with a season ending ranking of No. 10.

== 2021 to present – IRT finals and wins ==
The COVID-19 pandemic put a pause on most racquetball competitions, so Bredenbeck didn't compete at another big event for well over a year, when in the summer of 2021 USA Racquetball held its singles and doubles events together so as to select a team for the 2021 International Racquetball Federation World Championships. In 2021, Bredenbeck lost in the semi-finals at nationals to Alejandro Landa, 15–3, 15–11, He played doubles with his brother Sam for the first time, and they reached the final, where they lost to Rocky Carson and Charlie Pratt, 12–15, 15–4, 11–8.

Bredenbeck played singles at the 2021 World Championships, and he defeated Mexican Rodrigo Montoya in the Round of 16, 15–10, 15–14, but lost to Colombian Mario Mercado, 15–13, 11–15, 11–4, in the quarterfinals. The 2021 World Championships were the qualifying event for the 2022 World Games in Birmingham, Alabama, and Bredenbeck's performance qualified him for Birmingham.

In September 2021, Bredenbeck reached his first IRT final at the Shamrock Shootout in Lombard, Illinois, where he defeated Mario Mercado, 15–9, 12–15, 11–8, in the Round of 16, Alejandro Landa, 15–10, 15–12, in the quarterfinals, Andree Parrilla, 10–15, 15–3, 11–8, in the semi-finals, before losing to Daniel De La Rosa in the final, 15–10, 13–15, 11–1.

At the 2021 US Open, Bredenbeck defeated Alejandro Herrera, 15–4, 15–1, in the Round of 32, but lost to Eduardo Portillo, 15–10, 15–3, in the Round of 16. In doubles, he and Sam Bredenbeck lost to Roland Keller and Conrrado Moscoso, 15–2, 12–15, 11–0, in the Round of 16.

In 2022, USA Racquetball again had their singles and doubles championships together. In singles, Bredenbeck lost to Alajandro Landa, 11–5, 11–7, 11–4. In doubles, he and Sam Bredenbeck reached the final by defeating Landa and Sudsy Monchik, 8–11, 7–11, 11–3, 15–13, 13–11, but lost the final to Rocky Carson and Charlie Pratt, 9–11, 11–4, 11–6, 13–11. In mixed doubles, Bredenbeck and Aimee Roehler lost to Landa and Michelle De La Rosa, 11–4, 11–9, 11–5.

Bredenbeck competed at the 2022 World Games in Birmingham, Alabama, where he defeated Canadian Lee Connell, 15–14, 15–5, 15–12, in the Round of 16, but lost to Mexican Andree Parrilla, 15–8, 15–12, 15–10, in the quarterfinals.

Bredenbeck defeated Mario Mercado, 15–9, 15–12, in the Round of 16 at the 2022 US Open, but lost to Rodrigo Montoya, 15–13, 15–14, in the quarterfinals. However, in doubles Bredenbeck and his brother Sam beat Montoya and Javier Mar, 15–7, 15–10, in the quarterfinals. They then defeated Andree Parrilla and Samuel Murray, 11–15, 15–10, 11–8, before losing in the final to Alvaro Beltran and Daniel De La Rosa, 14–15, 15–10, 11–4.

He finished the 2022 IRT season well, as Bredenbeck was in two of the last three finals, and he won his first IRT event at the season's final event: the 2022 John Pelham Memorial Tournament of Champions in Portland, Oregon. There Bredenbeck reached the final by defeating Samuel Murray, 15–9, 15–4, in the quarterfinals, Andree Parrilla, 15–11, 10–15, 11–9, in the semi-finals, and Eduardo Portillo, 15–14, 8–15, 11–7, in the final. The win helped him finish ranked 7th on tour, a personal best.

At the 2023 USA Racquetball National Doubles Championships Bredenbeck and Sam Bredenbeck lost in the semi-finals to Daniel De La Rosa and Alejandro Landa, 12–10, 6–11, 11–7, 10–12, 11–2. In mixed doubles, he and Janel Tisinger-Ledkins lost to Adam Manilla and Erika Manilla, 8–11, 11–8, 11–3, 7–11, 11–2, in the quarterfinals.

Bredenbeck was 3rd at the 2023 USA Racquetball National Singles Championship, as he lost to Adam Manilla in the semi-finals, 2–11, 11–8, 12–10, 11–2, but then defeated Alejandro Landa, 11–8, 11–6, 8–11, 11–8, in the 3rd place match.

Bredenbeck was in four finals on the IRT in 2023, and won his second IRT title in April, when he defeated Daniel De La Rosa, 15–8, 6–15, 11–6, in the semi-finals, and Conrrado Moscoso, 15–12, 15–11, in the final, to capture the 2023 SoCal Open in Canoga Park, California. He finished No. 3 on the IRT in 2023, a career high.

Playing at the 2024 Pan American Racquetball Championships in Guatemala City, Bredenbeck won three medals. He got bronze in both Men's Singles and Men's Doubles with his brother Sam Bredenbeck, and silver in the Men's Team event with Sam, and Charlie Pratt.

Bredenbeck competed at the 2025 World Games in Chengdu, China, playing singles and mixed doubles with Naomi Ros. He and Ros won gold in mixed doubles, defeating Argentina's Diego Garcia and Maria Jose Vargas in the final, 11-7, 11-9, 11-6. They advanced to the final with a win over Canadians Coby Iwaasa and Frédérique Lambert in the semi-finals, 9-11, 11-5, 8-11, 11-9, 11–9. In singles, Bredenbeck lost to Guatemala's Edwin Galicia, 11-9, 9-11, 11-7, 11-6, in the quarterfinals.

== Career summary ==
Bredenbeck has won twice on the International Racquetball Tour and played for the US at the Pan American Games, World Championships, World Games, as well as the Pan American Championships.

=== Career record ===
This table lists Bredenbeck's results across annual events.

Event	2012	2013	2014	2015	2016	2017	2018	2019	2020	2021	2022	2023
USAR National Singles	-	-	W	W	SF	QF	QF	W	-	SF	SF	3rd
USAR National Doubles	-	-	4th	4th	W	QF	3rd	F	F	F	F	SF
US Open	64	32	32	16	QF	16	16	16	P	16	QF	-
US Open Doubles	-	-	16	F	SF	QF	SF	16	P	16	F	-
IRT Ranking	-	86	37	29	13	16	14	12	10	9	7	3
WRT Ranking	-	-	3	2	7	4	1	-	-	-	-	-

Note: W = winner, F = finalist, SF = semi-finalist, QF = quarterfinalist, 16 = Round of 16. P = Cancellation due to COVID-19 pandemic.

== Personal life ==
Bredenbeck is the oldest son of Karen and William, and he graduated from Colorado State University – Pueblo in 2013. His brother Sam is also an elite racquetball player. Together the brothers created Odisi Apparel.

He's a member of the Minnesota Racquetball Association Board of Directors, and is an Athlete Representative on the USA Racquetball Board of Directors.
