= Racquetball at the 2023 Pan American Games – Mixed doubles =

Mixed doubles at the 2023 Pan American Games
- Venue: Racket Sports Center
- Dates: October 21 - October 24
- Competitors: 20 from 10 nations

Medalists
Gold medal	Adam Manilla; Erika Manilla	United States
Silver medal	María José Vargas; Diego García	Argentina
Bronze medal	Paola Longoria; Eduardo Portillo	Mexico
Bronze medal	Conrrado Moscoso; Angélica Barrios	Bolivia

The mixed doubles competition of the racquetball events at the 2023 Pan American Games will be held from October 21 to 24 at Racket Sports Center in Santiago, Chile.

== Schedule ==
Date	Time	Round
October 21, 2023	17:00	Round of 16
October 22, 2023	17:00	Quarterfinals
October 23, 2023	17:00	Semifinals
October 24, 2023	15:00	Finals

== Results ==
Round of 16 (October 21)
Maricruz Ortiz (CRC); Andrés Acuña (CRC)	1
Frederique Lambert (CAN); Samuel Murray (CAN)	3
Carla Muñoz (CHI); Jaime Mansilla (CHI)	3
Maykel Moyet (CUB); Samira Ferrer (CUB)	1

Quarterfinals (October 22)
Conrrado Moscoso (BOL); Angélica Barrios (BOL)	3
Frederique Lambert (CAN); Samuel Murray (CAN)	1
Verónica Sotomayor (ECU); José Daniel Ugalde (ECU)	0
María José Vargas (ARG); Diego García (ARG)	3
Adam Manilla (USA); Erika Manilla (USA)	3
Gabriela Martínez (EAI); Edwin Galicia (EAI)	2
Carla Muñoz (CHI); Jaime Mansilla (CHI)	0
Paola Longoria (MEX); Eduardo Portillo (MEX)	3

Semifinals (October 23)
Conrrado Moscoso (BOL); Angélica Barrios (BOL)	2
María José Vargas (ARG); Diego García (ARG)	3
Adam Manilla (USA); Erika Manilla (USA)	3
Paola Longoria (MEX); Eduardo Portillo (MEX)	2

Final (October 24)
María José Vargas (ARG); Diego García (ARG)	0
Adam Manilla (USA); Erika Manilla (USA)	3
