= Coby Iwaasa =

Canadian racquetball player

Personal information
- Nationality: Canadian
- Born: June 19, 1996 (age 30) Lethbridge, Alberta
- Height: 175 cm (5 ft 9 in)
- Weight: 79 kg (174 lb)

Sport
- Sport: Racquetball
- Coached by: Michel Gagnon

Achievements and titles
- World finals: Doubles champion: 2024
- National finals: Singles champion: 2015, 2025: Doubles champion: 2013, 2015, 2018, 2023, 2025
Medal record
Men's Racquetball
Representing Canada
World Championships
Gold medal – first place	2024 San Antonio	Doubles
Silver medal – second place	2024 San Antonio	Team
Silver medal – second place	2022 San Luis Potosí	Team
Silver medal – second place	2022 San Luis Potosí	Mixed
Bronze medal – third place	2022 San Luis Potosí	Doubles
Pan American Games
Silver medal – second place	2023 Santiago	Team
Silver medal – second place	2023 Santiago	Doubles
Bronze medal – third place	2015 Toronto	Team
World Games
Bronze medal – third place	2025 Chengdu	Mixed Doubles
Pan American Championships
Silver medal – second place	2026 Guatemala City	Men's Doubles
Silver medal – second place	2024 Guatemala City	Men's Doubles
Silver medal – second place	2024 Guatemala City	Mixed Doubles
Bronze medal – third place	2024 Guatemala City	Men's Team
Gold medal – first place	2022 Santa Cruz	Men's Doubles
Silver medal – second place	2019 Barranquilla	Men's Doubles

Coby Iwaasa (born June 19, 1996) is a Canadian racquetball player. He is the current International Racquetball Federation (IRF) World Champion in Men's Doubles, winning the title with Samuel Murray in 2024. Previously, Iwaasa and Murray won the 2022 Pan American Championships Men's Doubles title, and he won two silver medals at the Racquetball at the 2023 Pan American Games in Santiago.

== Junior competitions ==
Iwaasa was a prodigious player as a junior, winning several Canadian Junior National Championships (Junior Nationals), including four Boy's U18 titles, which is a record. In Boys' Singles, he won U10 in 2007, Boy's U12 in 2009, and Boy's U14 in 2011. In 2012 and 2013, Iwaasa won both Boy's U16 and Boy's U18 at Junior Nationals. He also won Boy's U18 in his last two years of eligibility: 2014 and 2015. In those last two years he also won Boy's U18 Doubles: with Matthew Swaine in 2014 and with Nicolas Bousquet in 2015.

At the IRF World Junior Championships, Iwaasa finished 3rd in U14 in 2010 and 2011, 1st in U16 in 2012, and 3rd in 2013 in U16 and 3rd in U18 in 2014. He also played doubles at World Juniors finishing 3rd in U14 with Sami Harb in 2010, and 3rd in U14 with Matthew Swaine in 2011, 2nd in U16 with Harb in 2012, and 3rd in U16 with Nicolas Bousquet in 2013.

== 2012–2015 Career begins ==
Iwaasa played in the Racquetball Canada National Team Selection Event in February 2012 in Regina, where he lost in the Round of 16 to Francis Guillemette, 16–14, 15–8.

Iwaasa played at the Canadian National Championships (Nationals) for the first time in 2012 in Brossard, Québec, where he lost in the Round of 16 to Eric Desrochers, 15–7, 16–14. Iwaasa played Men's Doubles with Kurtis Cullen that year, and they lost in the quarterfinals to Mike Green and Kris Odegard, 15–2, 15–3.

Iwaasa played in the 1st Racquetball Canada National Team Selection Event of the 2012–13 season in November 2012 in Kelowna, British Columbia, where he lost in the quarterfinals to Tim Landeryou, 7–15, 16–14, 11–4. In the 2nd Racquetball Canada National Team Selection Event that season in February 2013 in Brossard, Québec, where he defeated Samuel Murray in the quarterfinals, 15–13, 16–14, but lost to Mike Green in the semi-finals, 15–13, 15–2. Iwaasa beat Pedro Castro in the 3rd place match, 15–8, 15–10.

Iwaasa played Men's Doubles with veteran Mike Green at the 2013 Canadian Championships in Langley, British Columbia, and they won the title, defeating Lee Connell and Francis Guillemette in the final, 15–5, 15–6. In the semi-finals, the defeated the brother team of Samuel Murray and Tommy Murray, 15–3, 15–6. That year in Men's Singles, Iwaasa lost to his partner Green, 15–3, 13–15, 11–2, in the semi-finals. But he won the 3rd place match against Nathaniel Husulak, 15–11, 15–7.

In November 2013, Iwaasa finished 3rd at the 1st National Team Selection Event of the 2013–14 season in Winnipeg, where he reached the semi-finals by defeating Nathaniel Husulak in the quarterfinals, 15–6, 15–7, but lost to Mike Green, 15–6, 15–9. In the 3rd place match, he defeated Samuel Murray, 15–10, 15–8. In the 2nd National Team Selection Event that season, he again played Green in the semis, and lost but in three games, 15–12, 8–15, 11–1, in Brossard, Québec in January 2014. In the 3rd place match, Tim Landeryou defeated Iwaasa, 15–7, 14–16, 11–6.

The 2014 Canadian National Championships were also in Brossard, and Iwaasa played doubles with Kurtis Cullen. They were seeded 4th, but were upset in the quarterfinals by veterans Francis Guillemette and Corey Osborne, 15–12, 15–11. Iwaasa was 3rd in Men's Singles for the second time, as he lost to eventual champion Vincent Gagnon, 15–10, 15–17, 11–6, in the semi-finals, but won the 3rd place match versus Samuel Murray, 13–15, 15–6, 11–8.

That summer Iwaasa played for Canada for the first time by participating in the 2014 Pan American Sports Festival in Guadalajara, Mexico, where he defeated team-mate Samuel Murray, 15–9, 10–15, 11–3, in the Round of 16, but lost to David Horn of the US in the quarterfinals, 8–15, 15–14, 11–6.

Iwaasa competed on the World Racquetball Tour (WRT) in 2014, and won the Fall Brawl event in Lombard, Illinois. He was seeded 7th, but he defeated 10th seed Sebastian Franco in the Round of 16, 15–11, 15–13, 2nd seed Polo Gutierrez in the quarterfinals, 15–6, 15–10, 3rd seed David Horn in the semi-finals, 10–15, 15–4, 11–5, and 1st seed Alejandro Cardona in the final, 9–15, 15–9, 11–8. He reached the quarterfinals in the other four WRT events that year.

In November 2014, Iwaasa defeated Samuel Murray, in the quarterfinals, 15–9, 15–10, of the 1st National Team Selection Event of the 2014–15 season in Kitchener, Ontario. He then lost to Mike Green, 15–6, 15–6, in the semi-finals. Iwaasa finished 3rd by defeating Tim Landeryou, 15–11, 15–9. He won the 2nd Selection Event that season in Brossard, Québec, where he beat Pedro Castro in the final, 15–9, 6–15, 11–8. In the semi-finals, Iwaasa beat Landeryou, 12–15, 15–4, 11–7.

Iwaasa played seven tournaments in the 2014–15 International Racquetball Tour season, but only made it to the quarterfinals in the second last event of the season: the 2015 ProKennex Tournament of Champions in Portland, Oregon, where he defeated Jose Rojas, 11–5, 11–6, 12–10, in the Round of 16, and then lost to Daniel de la Rosa in the quarterfinals, 6–11, 11–4, 11–5, 11–6. Previously that season, he'd played three tie-breakers in the Round of 16, losing two of them to De La Rosa and one to Jansen Allen.

Iwaasa built on the success he had at the 2nd Selection Event to win both Men's Singles and Men's Doubles at the 2015 Nationals in Burnaby, British Columbia. In Men's Singles, Iwaasa defeated Samuel Murray in the final, 15–10, 12–15, 11–7, to win his 1st Canadian Championship in Men's Singles. To reach the final, Iwaasa beat Tim Landeryou in the quarterfinals, 15–8, 15–0, and Mike Green in the semi-finals, 15–11, 15–12.

In Men's Doubles in Burnaby, Iwaasa played with Green, with whom he'd won the title two years before. They faced the defending champions Vincent Gagnon and Samuel Murray in the semi-finals, winning 15–9, 9–15, 11–4. In the final, they beat Nicolas Bousquet and Tommy Murray, 15–3, 15–11.

Those wins got Iwaasa a spot on Team Canada for the 2015 Pan American Games in Toronto, where he played Men's singles. In the medal round, he defeated Fernando Rios of Ecuador and Jake Bredenbeck, 15-4 15–9, before losing to Mexican Álvaro Beltrán in the quarterfinals, 15–3, 15–7. But Iwaasa helped Canada earn a bronze medal in the Men's Team event. Canada played the US in the semi-finals, and the deciding match was Iwaasa versus Rocky Carson. After losing game one, Iwaasa had a chance to force a tie-breaker, but came up short, as Carson won in two straight games, 15–6, 15–14.

Following the Pan American Games, Iwaasa, as a member of the Church of Jesus Christ of Latter-day Saints, went on a two-year mission to Japan.

== 2017-2021 – Career resumes ==
Returning to competition, Iwaasa played the 1st National Team Selection event of the 2017–18 season in Vernon, British Columbia, where he lost in the semi-finals to Samuel Murray, 15–11, 15–8. Iwaasa met Murray in the semi-finals of the 2nd National Team Selection Event that season in Kitchener, Ontario with the same result: a win for Murray, 15–2, 15–5.

Iwaasa and Murray played Men's Doubles together at the 2018 Canadian Championships in Winnipeg, and they won the title by defeating Nicolas Bousquet and Tommy Murray in the final, 15–13, 10–15, 11–6. They beat the brother team of James Landeryou and Tim Landeryou in the semi-finals, 15–13, 15–10. In Men's Singles, Iwaasa finished 2nd, as he lost to Murray in the final, 15–7, 10–15, 11–2. Iwaasa got to the final by defeating Tim Landeryou in the semi-finals, 15–6, 15–13.

Iwaasa represented Canada at the Racquetball World Championships for the first time in 2018 in San José, Costa Rica, where he played Men's Singles. In the medal round, he won his first match against Daeyong Kwon of South Korea, 15–11, 15–2, but lost to Colombian Mario Mercado in a tie-breaker, 15–13, 10–15, 11–9, in the Round of 16.

Iwaasa was a finalist at the World Racquetball Tour 2018 Canadian Open in Calgary, where he lost to Andree Parrilla in the final, 15–11, 15–13. He reached the final by defeating Gerardo Franco in the semi-finals, 15–7, 15–11.

In the 2018–19 season, Iwaasa was runner up to Samuel Murray at both the 1st National Team Selection Event in Valleyfield, Québec, where he was beaten in three games, 9–15, 15–6, 11–6, and the 2nd National Team Selection Event in Grande Prairie, Alberta, losing 15–10, 15–10.

In the second Racquetball Canada National Team Selection event of 2018–19 in Grande Prairie, Alberta, Iwaasa was 2nd to Murray, who won their final, 15–10, 15–10, in the final. He beat Trevor Webb in the semi-finals, 15–4, 14–15, 11–9.

Iwaasa was a member of Team Canada for the 2019 Pan American Racquetball Championships in Barranquilla, Colombia, where he reached an international final for the first time. Iwaasa and Samuel Murray were finalists in Men's Doubles. They beat Costa Ricans Andres Acuña and Felipe Camacho in the semi-finals, 8–15, 15–1, 11–3, but lost to Bolivians Roland Keller and Conrrado Moscoso, 2–15, 15–9, 11–2, in the final. Iwaasa also played Men's Singles in Barranquilla, where he lost in the Round of 16 to eventual Pan Am Champion Carlos Keller of Bolivia, 15–10, 15–9.

Iwaasa was runner up in Men's Singles at the 2019 Canadian Championships, as he lost in the final to Samuel Murray, 15–3, 15–6, in Langley, British Columbia. He beat Tim Landeryou in the semi-finals, 15–13, 15–2. Iwaasa played doubles with Trevor Webb for the first time, and they finished 3rd. They lost in the semi-finals to Murray and his brother Tommy, 11–15, 15–10, 11–4. But they won the 3rd place match against Nicolas Bousquet and Pedro Castro, 15–11, 15–9.

For the 2nd time in his career, Iwaasa played in the Pan American Games. He competed in the 2019 Pan American Games in Lima, Peru, where he played in Men's Singles, Men's Doubles, and the Men's Team event. Iwaasa was a quarterfinalist in all three. In Men's singles, he narrowly lost to eventual silver medalist Álvaro Beltrán of Mexico, 15–14, 15–13. He played Men's doubles with Samuel Murray, and as in singles, Iwaasa and Murray were quarterfinalists, losing to Mexicans Rodrigo Montoya and Javier Mar, 15–5, 15–6. Murray and Iwaasa lost in the Men's Team quarterfinals to Colombia, who went on to take silver.

In the 2019–20 season, Iwaasa finished 2nd at both National Team Selection Events. The first was held in Sherwood Park, Alberta, where he was runner up to Samuel Murray, losing in the final, 15–5, 15–8. He also lost to Murray in the final of the second event in Winnipeg, although that match went to a tie-breaker with Murray coming out on top, 8–15, 15–7, 11–1.

Iwaasa was on Team Canada for the 2021 IRF World Championships in Guatemala City, Guatemala, where he played Men's Doubles with Samuel Murray. They lost to Bolivians Roland Keller and Conrrado Moscoso, 9–15, 15–12, 11–4, in the quarterfinals, although they had beaten Bolivia in the group stage of matches.

== 2022-present – Winning at Pan American Championships and Worlds ==
Iwaasa won Men's Doubles with Samuel Murray at the 2022 Pan American Racquetball Championships in Santa Cruz de la Sierra, Bolivia. They defeated the Ecuador team of Juan Francisco Cueva and Jose Daniel Ugalde in the final, 10–15, 15–13, 15–5, 11–15, 11–5. He also played Mixed Doubles in Bolivia with Juliette Parent, and they lost in the quarterfinals to eventual gold medalists Mexicans Rodrigo Montoya and Samantha Salas, 15–6, 15–9, 15–12.

He was runner up in both Men's Singles and Men's Doubles at the 2022 Canadian Championships in Brossard, Québec in May, 2022. Iwaasa lost to Samuel Murray in the Men's Singles final, 15–9, 15–8, 15–8, after beating Trevor Webb in the semi-finals, 15–13, 15–7, 15–12. Iwaasa played doubles with Kurtis Cullen, and they lost to Murray and his brother Tommy in the final, 12–15, 15–14, 15–6, 15–9.

Iwaasa was part of two medals for Canada at the 2022 IRF World Championships in San Luis Potosí, Mexico. He and Samuel Murray were bronze medalists in Men's Doubles, and he was part of the Men's Team that were runners up to Mexico. Iwaasa helped Canada finish 4th overall as a team.

Iwaasa played Men's Doubles (with Samuel Murray) and Mixed Doubles with Danielle Ramsay at the 2023 Pan American Racquetball Championships in Guatemala City, Guatemala. Murray was injured in the last doubles match of the group stage, so Trevor Webb played with Iwaasa in the rest of the tournament. Murray's injury also meant that Iwaasa played singles in the medal round. In doubles, he and Webb lost to Costa Ricans Andrés Acuña and Gabriel Garcia in the quarterfinals, 11-3, 11-2, 14-12, and they played each other in the Round of 16 in singles, with Webb winning 11-5, 11-9, 12-10. In Mixed Doubles, Iwaasa and Ramsay lost to Ecuador's Maria Paz Muñoz and Jose Francisco Cueva, 11-7, 7-11, 9-11, 11-5, 11-9.

At the 2023 Racquetball Canada National Championships in Winnipeg, Manitoba, Iwaasa and Kurtis Cullen defeated Samuel Murray and Tommy Murray in the Men's Doubles final, 12–10, 11–9, 11–4. The win was Iwaasa's fourth Canadian Men's Doubles title. In singles, he lost to Samuel Murray in the final, 11–4, 12–10, 11–3.

Iwaasa was part of Team Canada at the 2023 Pan American Games in Santiago, Chile. He played singles, doubles and the men's team event. Iwaasa earned two silver medals in Santiago. In Men's Doubles, he and Samuel Murray defeated the Independent Athletes team of Edwin Galicia and Juan José Salvatierra, 11-9, 8-11, 11-7, 8-11, 11-7, in the semi-finals, and then in the final lost to Mexicans Javier Mar and Rodrigo Montoya, 6-11, 11-7, 12-10, 12-10. Iwaasa and Murray were also in the Men's Team final, losing to Bolivia 2-0, with Iwaasa falling to Carlos Keller in five games, 7-11, 11-5, 7-11, 11-7, 13-11.

Playing at the 2024 Pan American Racquetball Championships in Guatemala City, Iwaasa won three medals. He was runner up in Men's Doubles with Samuel Murray to Costa Ricans Andrés Acuña and Gabriel Garcia, and in Mixed Doubles with Juliette Parent to Americans Sam Bredenbeck and Michelle Key. Iwaasa also got a bronze medal in the Men's Team event, as he helped Canada beat Guatemala in the quarterfinals, but they lost to Mexico in the semi-finals.

Iwaasa and Samuel Murray became the first Canadian men to win Men's Doubles at the IRF World Championships, as they captured gold at the 2024 World Championships in San Antonio, Texas. They defeated Bolivians Kadim Carrasco and Conrrado Moscoso in the semi-finals, 5-11, 12-10, 11-7, 8-11, 11-8, and then Mexicans Andree Parrilla and Eduardo Portillo in the final, 11-5, 6-11, 11-8, 4-11, 11-6. Iwaasa also helped Canada finish 2nd in the Men's Team event at Worlds, losing to the USA in the final, 2-1.

Iwaasa won both singles and doubles (with Kurtis Cullen) at the 2025 Racquetball Canada National Championships in Burlington, Ontario. He defeated Samuel Murray, 11-6, 3-11, 11-4, 11-4, in the singles final, and Iwaasa and Cullen beat Leyton Gouldie and Asher Pocsai in the doubles final, 11-7, 11-4, 9-11, 11-5. These were Iwaasa's 2nd singles title and 5th doubles title.

His Nationals results earned Iwaasa entry to the 2025 World Games in Chengdu, China, where he played singles and mixed doubles with Frédérique Lambert. The pair reached the semi-finals, losing to the USA's Jake Bredenbeck and Naomi Ros, 9-11, 11-5, 8-11, 11-9, 11-9, but won the bronze medal match against Japan's Michimune Kono and Harumi Kajino, 11-3, 11-7, 7-11, 11-4.

Iwaasa and Samuel Murray won silver in Men's Doubles at the 2026 Pan American Racquetball Championships in Guatemala City, where they lost to Mexicans Javier Mar and Rodrigo Montoya in the final, 7-11, 11-8, 11-7, 14-16, 11-6, after defeating Ecuadorans Juan Francisco Cueva and Jose Daniel Ugalde in the semi-finals, 11-9, 9-11, 11-2, 11-5. Iwaasa also played singles Guatemala, and defeated Mexican Andree Parrilla in the Round of 16, 9-11, 12-10, 11-8, 9-11, 11-8, but lost in the quarterfinals to Bolivian Santiago Borja, 11-8, 9-11, 12-10, 6-11, 11-9.

== Career summary ==
Iwaasa has played for Team Canada numerous times, twice winning gold: first, in Men's Doubles at the 2022 Pan American Racquetball Championships with Samuel Murray, and second, again with Murray, in Men's Doubles at the 2024 World Championships. He also earned two silver medals at the 2023 Pan American Games. Domestically, Iwaasa's won seven Canadian Championships: two in Men's Singles in 2015 and 2025, and five in Men's Doubles – in 2013 and 2015 with Mike Green, one in 2018 with Murray, and in 2023 and 2025 with Kurtis Cullen.

=== Career record ===
This table lists Iwaasa's results across annual events.

Event	2012	2013	2014	2015	2016	2017	2018	2019	2020	2021	2022	2023	2024	2025	2026
National Team Selection Event #1	-	QF	3rd	3rd	-	-	3rd	F	F	*	*	W	F	F	F
National Team Selection Event #2	16	3rd	3rd	W	-	-	3rd	F	F	*	F	F	-	F	F
Canadian National Singles	16	3rd	3rd	W	-	-	F	F	*	F	F	F	F	W	F
Canadian National Doubles	QF	W	QF	W	-	-	W	3rd	*	F	F	W	-	W	F

Note: W = winner, F = finalist, SF = semi-finalist, QF = quarterfinalist, 16 = Round of 16. The years refer to the year the event occurred or the season in which they occurred. For example, Iwaasa was a finalist in both Selection Event #1 and #2 in the 2018–19 season, although those events happened in different calendar years. "*" = Cancelled due to COVID-19 pandemic.

== Personal ==
Iwaasa is from Lethbridge, Alberta. His cousin Alexis also played racquetball, and was a Canadian Junior Champion. He's a graduate of the Canadian Memorial Chiropractic College in Toronto. Iwaasa is married to Andrea Martinez, the older sister of Gabriela Martinez.

Iwaasa was the Senior Male Athlete Lethbridge Sport Council Achievement Award winner for 2024 in recognition of accomplishments in that year, including winning Men's Doubles at the 2024 World Championships. This was Iwaasa's third such award. His first was in 2015 for Junior Male Athlete, and now twice for Senior Male Athlete with the first coming in 2022.

== See also ==
- List of racquetball players
