= Eduardo Portillo =

Mexican racquetball player

Personal information
- Nationality: Mexican
- Born: Eduardo Portillo Torres; April 3, 1999 (age 27)

Sport
- Sport: Racquetball

Achievements and titles
- Highest world ranking: 4th 2022
Medal record
Men's Racquetball
Representing Mexico
World Championships
Bronze medal – third place	2024 San Antonio	Singles
Silver medal – second place	2024 San Antonio	Doubles
Bronze medal – third place	2024 San Antonio	Team
Pan American Games
Bronze medal – third place	2023 Santiago	Singles
Bronze medal – third place	2023 Santiago	Mixed Doubles
Bronze medal – third place	2023 Santiago	Team
The World Games
Bronze medal – third place	2025 Chengdu	Singles
Central American and Caribbean Games
Silver medal – second place	2026 Santo Domingo	Singles
Gold medal – first place	2026 Santo Domingo	Silver
Gold medal – first place	2026 Santo Domingo	Team
Gold medal – first place	2023 San Salvador	Singles
Gold medal – first place	2023 San Salvador	Mixed Doubles
Gold medal – first place	2023 San Salvador	Team
Pan American Championships
Silver medal – second place	2026 Guatemala City	Singles
Gold medal – first place	2026 Guatemala City	Team
Gold medal – first place	2023 Guatemala City	Doubles

Eduardo Portillo (born April 3, 1999) is a Mexican racquetball player, who has represented Mexico at the Pan American Games and the International Racquetball Federation (IRF) World Championships, as well as competing on the International Racquetball Tour. He's the current Central American and Caribbean Games champion in Men's Doubles (with Andree Parrilla, winning the title in 2026.

== Junior years - 2014-2018 ==
Portillo played for Mexico at the International Racquetball Federation (IRF) 2014 World Junior Championships in Cali, Colombia, where he Lost in semi-finals of Boys U14 to American Jordan Barth, 15–8, 10–15, 11–7. But he and Santiago Garcia won the Boys U14 Doubles title by defeating Costa Ricans Julian Hamburger and Andres Montero in the final, 15–12, 8–15, 11–5.

He won both singles and doubles in Boys U16 at World Juniors in 2016 in San Luis Potosí, Mexico. In singles, Portillo defeated his team-mate Sebastian Fernandez in final, 15–9, 15–14., and in doubles he and Rodrigo Rodriguez defeated Fernando Ruiz and Bernardo Valencia of Bolivia in the final, 15–5, 15–12.

In 2017, Portillo lost in the final of Boys U18 Singles at World Juniors in Minneapolis to American Mauro Rojas in final, 15–6, 15–14, after beating Canadian Trevor Webb in semi-finals, 15–3, 15–11. However, he did win Boys U18 Doubles with Gerardo Franco, defeating Webb and Simon Comeau in the final, 15–9, 15–2.

In 2018, his last year of junior eligibility, Portillo won Boys U18 Singles at World Juniors in San Luis Potosí, Mexico, defeating fellow Mexican Sebastian Fernandez in final, 14–15, 15–4, 11–7.

== 2019-2022 - Beginning to play the pro tour ==
Portillo played some events on the International Racquetball Tour (IRT) beginning in the 2017–18 season, but he wasn't a full time player on tour until the 2019–20 season. That season he reached his first final, and finished 8th in the season ending rankings.

In 2021, he was in another final, and improved his ranking to 5th. Then in 2022, Portillo won his first IRT event. Portillo won the 2022 Capital Classic in Millersville, Maryland. He defeated Alejandro Landa in the quarterfinals, 15–11, 15–8, and then got a win over Kane Waselenchuk in the semi-finals, as Waselenchuk suffered an achilles injury during the first game of the match. In the final, Portillo beat Javier Mar, 15–7, 15–3.

== 2023-present - Winning medals for Mexico ==
Portillo played at the 2023 Pan American Championships in Guatemala City, Guatemala, where he won Men's Doubles with Rodrigo Montoya. They defeated Bolivians Kadim Carrasco and Carlos Keller, 11–3, 14–12, 11–13, 11–8, in the final. Portillo also played singles in Guatemala, and he lost in the quarterfinals to Argentina's Diego Garcia, 8–11, 11–8, 11–8, 8–11, 11–8.

Portillo won gold for Mexico in Men's Singles at the 2023 Central American and Caribbean Games, as he defeated countryman Rodrigo Montoya in the final, 11–7, 13–11, 15–13. He advanced to the final by beating Costa Rican Andrés Acuña, 11–7, 11–3, 11–8. Portillo and Paola Longoria won Mixed Doubles, as they came back from 2–1 down to defeat Edwin Galicia and Gabriela Martinez (Centro Caribe Sports), 11–6, 10–12, 7–11, 11–6, 11–6. He also helped Mexico win gold in the Men's Team event, as they defeated Costa Rica in the final. Portillo defeated Felipe Camacho, 11–3, 11–4, 11–5, in the first match of the final.

At the 2023 Pan American Games in Santiago, Chile, Portillo earned three bronze medals: in singles, mixed doubles and the men's team event. In Men's Singles, he defeated Daniel De La Rosa of the US in the quarterfinals, 10–12, 13–11, 12–10, 9–11, 13–11, but lost to Bolivian Conrrado Moscoso in the semi-finals, 11–3, 14–12, 12–10. In Mixed Doubles, Portillo played with Paola Longoria, and they lost in the semi-finals to Americans Adam Manilla and Erika Manilla, 11–9, 13–11, 6–11, 8–11, 11–7. In the Men's Team event, Mexico lost to Canada, 2–1, in the semi-finals, although Portillo won his singles match against Coby Iwaasa, 11–8, 16–14, 11–8.

Portillo earned three medals at the 2024 Racquetball World Championships in San Antonio, Texas. He and Andree Parrilla were silver medalists in Men's Doubles, as they defeated Americans Adam Manilla and Sebastian Fernandez, 11–4, 2–11, 11–7, 12–10, in the semi-finals, but lost Canadians Coby Iwaasa and Samuel Murray in the final, 11–5, 6–11, 11–8, 4–11, 11–6. In Men's Singles, Portillo upset Bolivian Conrrado Moscoso in the quarterfinals, 11–7, 13–15, 11–8, 5–11, 11–6, but lost to American Jake Bredenbeck in the semi-finals, 11–8, 12–10, 14–12. He also helped Mexico to a bronze medal in the Men's Team event, as they defeated Guatemala in the quarterfinals, but lost to Canada in the semi-finals.

== Career summary ==
Portillo has played on the International Racquetball Tour full time since the 2019–20 season, and has one win on tour. He's played for Mexico at the Pan American Games, World Championships, Central American and Caribbean Games, as well as the Pan American Championships.

=== Career record ===
This table lists Portillo's results across annual events.

Event	2017	2018	2019	2020	2021	2022	2023	2024
US Open	32	-	16	P	QF	QF	-	-
US Open Doubles
IRT Ranking		42	17	8	5	4	7	

Note: W = winner, F = finalist, SF = semi-finalist, QF = quarterfinalist, 16 = Round of 16. P = Cancellation due to COVID-19 pandemic.
