= Andree Parrilla =

Mexican racquetball player (born 1996)

Personal information
- Born: July 23, 1996 (age 30) San Luis Potosí, Mexico

Sport
- Country: Mexico
- Sport: Racquetball
- Coached by: Fabian Parrilla

Achievements and titles
- Highest world ranking: 2
Medal record
Men's Racquetball
Representing Mexico
World Championships
Silver medal – second place	2024 San Antonio	Doubles
Bronze medal – third place	2024 San Antonio	Team
Pan American Championships
Gold medal – first place	2026 Guatemala City	Team
Bronze medal – third place	2026 Guatemala City	Mixed Doubles
Bronze medal – third place	2018 Temuco	Singles
Silver medal – second place	2012 Santa Cruz	Singles
Central American and Caribbean Games
Gold medal – first place	2026 Santo Domingo	Doubles
Gold medal – first place	2026 Santo Domingo	Team
The World Games
Bronze medal – third place	2022 Birmingham	Singles

Andree Parrilla (born July 23, 1996) is a Mexican racquetball player. He is the current Central American and Caribbean Games champion in Men's Doubles, winning the title with Eduardo Portillo at the 2026 Central American and Caribbean Games in Santo Domingo. Parrilla has won 3 major singles titles and 8 doubles titles on the International Racquetball Tour.

== Junior years – Success at World Juniors ==
Parrilla played Boys U14 Singles at the 2011 International Racquetball Federation (IRF) World Junior Championships in Santo Domingo, Dominican Republic, where he lost in the quarterfinals to Bolivia's Marcelo Vargas, 15–11, 15–14. He next played at World Juniors in 2013, when Parrilla won Boys U16 Singles in Sucre, Bolivia, where he defeated Coby Iwaasa in the semi-finals, 15–5, 15–6, and Rodrigo Montoya, 15–9, 15–11. Finally, Parrilla was runner up in Boys U18 at World Juniors in 2015 in Santo Domingo, Dominican Republic, where he lost to Rodrigo Montoya in the final, 15–7, 15–11.

While still a teenager, Parrilla made his first appearance with the Mexico National Team at the 2014 Pan American Racquetball Championships in Santa Cruz, Bolivia in Men's Singles. He reached the final by beating Bolivia's Carlos Keller in the quarterfinals, 7–15, 15–11, 11–6, and Canada's Vincent Gagnon, 15–10, 15–9, in the semi-finals, and lost to USA's Jose Rojas, 15–4, 15–11.

== Pro career begins – 2015–2018 ==
In 2015, Parrilla began to play regularly on both the International Racquetball Tour and the World Racquetball Tour (WRT), although he had played a few events on both tours in the seasons prior to that. He played half of the IRT events in the 2015–16 season, reaching the quarterfinals once, and finishing 17th overall.

In 11 appearances on the WRT in 2015, Parrilla was in six semi-finals, one final and won one event: the 2015 Monterrey Open, where he defeated Jaime Martell in the final, 15–11, 15–7. That year, Parrilla was the 4th ranked WRT player.

Parrilla played 6 of the 7 WRT events in 2016, and won his second event at the 2016 WRT Atlanta Open, where he defeated Polo Gutierrez in the final, 15–11, 15–14. He finished 3rd in the 2016 WRT rankings.

In the 2016–17 IRT season, Parrilla had a breakthrough result, getting to a final for the first time at the 2017 Shamrock Shootout. To reach the final, Parrilla, who was seeded 14th, defeated 3rd seed Daniel de la Rosa in the Round of 16, 11–3, 1–11, 11–9, 10–12, 12–10, 11th seed Alejandro Landa in the quarterfinals, 11–8, 10–12, 11–3, 12–10, and 2nd seed Rocky Carson in the semi-finals, 3–11, 11–8, 4–11, 11–5, 11–8, before losing to top seed Kane Waselenchuk in the final, 11–1, 11–4, 12–10. That result helped Parrilla finish 10th in the season ending IRT rankings, which was his first time in the top 10.

Parrilla played 11 WRT events in 2017, and was in three finals, winning two of them. In May, he defeated Rodrigo Montoya, 15–12, 15–9, to win the 2017 Georgia Open. Then in October, Parrilla won the 2017 Casino Racquetball Open in Mexicali, Mexico by defeating Alejandro Landa in the semi-finals, 15–8, 15–11, and Álvaro Beltrán in the final, 15–9, 15–9. The wins helped Parrilla finish 3rd in the 2017 WRT rankings.

He won his first IRT title at the 2018 Shamrock Shootout in what was only his 2nd career IRT final. Parrilla was seeded 9th, and to win the title he beat 8th seed Jansen Allen in the Round of 16, 15–12, 15–10, 1st seed Rocky Carson in the quarterfinals, 15–12, 14–15, 11–8, 5th Samuel Murray in the semi-finals, 15–8, 11–15, 11–2, and 11th seed David Horn, in the final, 15–1, 15–9. He finished the 2017–18 season ranked 11th.

Parrilla made his second appearance on the Mexico National Team at the 2018 Pan American Racquetball Championships in Temuco, Chile, where he earned a bronze medal in Men's Singles after losing to USA's David Horn in the semi-finals, 15–13, 15–14.

Parrilla won his 5th WRT title in 2018, when he defeated Coby Iwaasa, 15–11, 15–13, at the 2018 Canadian Open in Calgary. Parrilla finished 2018 as the 2nd ranked WRT player, as the WRT wound down. There was only one more WRT event after the Canadian Open.

== Full time on the IRT – 2018–present ==
Parrilla fully committed to the IRT in 2018–19, when he played all of the events. He made four semi-finals that season, including his first US Open Racquetball Championships semi, which was a career best. At the Open, Parrilla beat Samuel Murray in the Round of 16, 15–8, 15–8, and Alejandro Landa in the quarterfinals, 6–15, 15–10, 11–5, and then lost to Kane Waselenchuk in the semis, 15–3, 15–12. He didn't reach a singles final that season, but Parrilla did win doubles with Rodrigo Montoya at the 41st Lewis Drug Pro-Am in January of 2019, when they defeated Alvaro Beltran and Daniel De La Rosa in the semi-finals, 15-14, 11-15, 11-10, and then Alejandro Landa and Samuel Murray in the final, 15-11, 15-11. That was Parrilla's first IRT doubles title. At the end of the 2018-19 season, Parrilla had a career high 4th-place ranking.

He reached his third IRT final at the 2019 Atlanta Open. Parrilla reached the final by defeating Carlos Keller, 15–8, 15–8, in the Round of 16, Álvaro Beltrán, 15–6, 14–15, 11–4, in the quarterfinals, Sebastian Franco, 15–7, 15–7, in the semi-finals, only to lose to Rocky Carson in the final, 15–13, 15–8. Overall in the 2019–20 IRT season, he finished 4th in the rankings, tying his career high from a season before.

Parrilla represented Mexico at the 2021 IRF World Championships in Guatemala City, Guatemala. He defeated Ramon De Leon of the Dominican Republic, 15–6, 15–4, in the Round of 16, but lost to Bolivia's Conrrado Moscoso, 15–12, 15–14, in the quarterfinals.

In 2021, Parrilla was ranked 4th on the IRT for the third season running, as he was in three semi-finals and three quarterfinals that year.

In the first IRT event of 2022, Parrilla picked up his 2nd career title, as he won the 2022 Suivant Consulting Grand Slam. En route to the title, he defeated Sebastian Franco, 15–10, 15–11, in the quarterfinals, Daniel de la Rosa, 7–15, 15–10, 11–7, in the semi-finals, and then came back from a game down to beat Kane Waselenchuk, 14–15, 15–2, 11–10. The win makes Parrilla just one of seven active players with multiple IRT titles.

In March 2024, Parrilla won doubles with Adam Manilla at the International Racquetball Tour Minnesota Hall of Fame tournament, as they defeated Kurtis Cullen and Rodrigo Montoya in the final after Montoya had to retire due to injury with the score 3-3 in the first game. They reached the final by beating Andrés Acuña and Alan Natera, 15-8, 15-2, in the semi-finals.

Parrilla won Men's Doubles with Eduardo Portillo at the 2026 Central American and Caribbean Games in Santo Domingo, Dominican Republic. They defeated Guatemalans Christian Aldana and Juan Salvatierra, 11-1, 12-10, 11-8, in the final. Parrilla was also won gold in the Men's Team event, as Mexico defeated Costa Rica 2-0 in the final.

== Personal life ==
Parrilla is coached by his father, Fabian, and his sister, Jessica, is also an elite racquetball player.

== Career summary ==
Parrilla has won three times on the International Racquetball Tour, and he has won three singles medals on Team Mexico.

=== Career record ===
This table lists Parrilla's results across annual events.

Event	2013	2014	2015	2016	2017	2018	2019	2020	2021	2022	2023	2024	2025-26
US Open	32	32	32	16	16	SF	QF	P	SF	SF	-	-	-
IRT Ranking	51	29	26	17	10	11	4	4	4	2	5	5	8
World Racquetball Tour Ranking	25	20	4	3	3	2	-						

Note: W = winner, F = finalist, SF = semi-finalist, QF = quarterfinalist, 16 = Round of 16. P = pandemic cancelled event. There was no US Open in 2023.

== See also ==
- List of racquetball players
