= Racquetball at the 2019 Pan American Games – Men's doubles =

Racquetball – Men's doubles at the 2019 Pan American Games
- Venue: Racquetball Courts
- Dates: August 2–7, 2019
- Competitors: 25

Medalists
Gold medal	Javier Mar; Rodrigo Montoya	Mexico
Silver medal	Conrrado Moscoso; Roland Keller	Bolivia
Bronze medal	Rocky Carson; Charles Pratt	United States
Bronze medal	Andrés Acuña; Felipe Camacho	Costa Rica

The men's doubles racquetball competition at the 2019 Pan American Games in Lima, Peru were held between August 2 and 7, 2019 at the Racquetball courts located at the Villa Deportiva Regional del Callao cluster. Javier Mar and Rodrigo Montoya of Mexico won gold in Men's Doubles. Their win was the third time a Mexican team has won gold in Men's Doubles in Racquetball at the Pan American Games.

== Schedule ==
All times are Central Standard Time (UTC-6).

Date	Time	Round
August 2, 2019	10:00	Round Robin
August 3, 2019	10:00	Round Robin
August 4, 2019	10:00	Round Robin
August 5, 2019	16:00	Round of 16
August 6, 2019	14:00	Quarterfinals
August 6, 2019	17:30	Semi-finals
August 7, 2019	10:00	Final

== Group stage ==
The competition begins with a round robin with athletes divided into groups. The results of the group stage were used to seed the teams for the medal round. Groups was announced at the technical meeting the day before the competition begins.

=== Pool A ===
Player	Nation	Pld	W	L	GF	GA	PF	PA	Difference
Conrrado Moscoso & Roland Keller	Bolivia	3	3	0	6	0	90	13	77
Fernando Rios & Jose Daniel Ugalde	Ecuador	3	2	1	4	2	62	52	10
Sebastian Franco & Mario Mercado	Colombia	3	1	2	2	4	60	63	-3
Jonathan Luque & Sebastiean Mendiguri	Peru	3	0	3	0	6	6	90	84

=== Pool B ===
Player	Nation	Pld	W	L	GF	GA	PF	PA	Difference
Rocky Carson & Charles Pratt	United States	3	3	0	6	1	100	83	17
Coby Iwaasa & Samuel Murray	Canada	3	2	1	5	2	101	61	40
Fernando Kurzbard & Shai Manzuri	Argentina	3	1	2	3	4	60	83	-23
Edwin Galicia & Juan Salvatierra	Guatemala	3	0	3	1	6	61	95	-34

=== Pool C ===
Player	Nation	Pld	W	L	GF	GA	PF	PA	Difference
Javier Mar & Rodrigo Montoya	Mexico	3	3	0	6	1	94	50	44
Andrés Acuña & Felipe Camacho	Costa Rica	3	2	1	4	2	62	56	6
Luis Pérez & Ramón de León	Dominican Republic	3	1	2	3	5	87	90	-3
Enier Chacón & Maykel Moyet	Cuba	3	0	3	1	6	43	90	-47

== Playoffs ==
First Round
9	Luis Pérez (Dominican Republic) Ramón de León (DOM)	8	14
8	Sebastian Franco (Colombia) Mario Mercado (COL)	15	15
5	Coby Iwaasa (Canada) Samuel Murray (CAN)	15	15
8	Jonathan Luque (Peru) Sebastian Mendiguri (PER)	2	3
11	Edwin Galicia (Guatemala) Juan Salvatierra (GUA)	15	15
6	Fernando RIos (Colombia) Jose Daniel Ugalde (ECU)	10	10
7	Fernando Kurzbard (Argentina) Shai Manzuri (ARG)	10	15	4
Enier Chacón (Cuba) Maykel Moyet (CUB)	15	11	11

Quarterfinals
1	Rocky Carson (United States) Charles Pratt (USA)	5	15	11
8	Sebastian Franco (Colombia) Mario Mercado (COL)	15	7	7
5	Coby Iwaasa (Canada) Samuel Murray (CAN)	5	6
4	Javier Mar (Mexico) Rodrigo Montoya (MEX)	15	15
3	Andrés Acuña (Costa Rica) Felipe Camacho (CRC)	15	15
11	Edwin Galicia (Guatemala) Juan Salvatierra (GUA)	8	5
10	Enier Chacón (Cuba) Maykel Moyet (CUB)	3	7
2	Roland Keller (Bolivia) Conrrado Moscoso (BOL)	15	15

Semifinals
1	Rocky Carson (United States) Charles Pratt (USA)	15	9	8
4	Javier Mar (Mexico) Rodrigo Montoya (MEX)	11	15	11
3	Andrés Acuña (Costa Rica) Felipe Camacho (CRC)	15	12	7
2	Roland Keller (Bolivia) Conrrado Moscoso (BOL)	13	15	11

Final
4	Javier Mar (Mexico) Rodrigo Montoya (MEX)	15	15
2	Roland Keller (Bolivia) Conrrado Moscoso (BOL)	10	1
