= 2022 Racquetball World Championships – Men's Singles =

Men's singles at the XXI Racquetball World Championships
- Location: San Luis Potosi, Mexico
- Dates: August 20–27

Medalists
gold medal	(Bolivia) Conrrado Moscoso
silver medal	(United States) Rocky Carson
bronze medal	(Mexico) Rodrigo Montoya (Costa Rica) Andrés Acuña

The International Racquetball Federation's 21st Racquetball World Championships were held in San Luis Potosi, Mexico from August 20-27, 2022. This was the first time Worlds was in Mexico since 2000, when it was also held in San Luis Potosi.

The 2022 World Championships used a best of five games match format with each game to 11 points, win by 2, with rally scoring, as used in other sports like squash and volleyball. Previously, racquetball games used side-out scoring, where players scored points only when they had won a rally which began with that player serving. Rallies won when not serving were simply side-outs: the rally losing player lost the serve and the rally winning player won the opportunity to serve, but did not win a point.

Bolivian Conrrado Moscoso won men's singles for the first time by defeating American Rocky Carson in the final, 8-11, 11-7, 11-4, 11-8. Moscoso is the first Bolivian (and first South American) to win men's singles at Worlds. The final was a rematch of the men's singles final at the 2014 Racquetball World Championships, when Carson defeated Moscoso to win the fourth of his record five men's singles World Championships. 2022 was the first time Carson had lost in a men's singles final at Worlds.

== Tournament format ==
The 2022 World Championships used a two-stage format to determine the World Champions. Initially, players competed in separate groups over three days. The results were used to seed players for the medal round, with only the top two players from each group advancing to the medal round.

== Men’s singles ==
=== Preliminary round ===
Group 1

Players	Pld	W	L	GW	GL	PW	PL	Points
(United States) Rocky Carson	2	2	0	6	0	66	36	4
(Ecuador) Juan Francisco Cueva	2	1	1	3	4	60	61	3
(Argentina) Diego Garcia	2	0	2	1	6	45	74	2

Group 2

Players	Pld	W	L	GW	GL	PW	PL	Points
(Ecuador) José Daniel Ugalde	2	2	0	6	3	94	71	4
(Costa Rica) Andrés Acuña	2	1	1	5	3	83	61	3
(Chile) Tomás Oyhanart	2	0	2	1	6	31	76	2

Group 3

Players	Pld	W	L	GW	GL	PW	PL	Points
(United States) Alejandro Landa	3	3	0	9	2	112	70	6
(Guatemala) Edwin Galicia	3	2	1	7	3	96	75	5
(Dominican Republic) Ramón de León	3	1	2	3	7	77	96	4
(Spain) Fabian Balmori	3	0	3	2	9	72	116	3

Group 4

Players	Pld	W	L	GW	GL	PW	PL	Points
(Canada) Kurtis Cullen	3	3	0	9	3	120	62	6
(Japan) Michimune Kono	3	2	1	7	3	95	84	5
(Costa Rica) Sergio Acuña	3	1	2	5	6	94	84	4
(Cuba) Yandy Espinosa	3	0	3	0	9	39	99	3

Group 5

Players	Pld	W	L	GW	GL	PW	PL	Points
(Mexico) Daniel De La Rosa	3	3	0	9	0	99	37	6
(Guatemala) Juan Salvatierra	3	2	1	6	5	93	91	5
(Chile) Jaime Mansilla	3	1	2	5	6	96	93	4
(India) Arun Bhaskaran	3	0	3	0	9	32	99	3

Group 6

Players	Pld	W	L	GW	GL	PW	PL	Points
(Bolivia) Conrrado Moscoso	3	3	0	9	0	99	42	6
(Canada) Lee Connell	3	2	1	6	3	81	77	5
(Cuba) Maikel Moyet	3	1	2	3	6	66	83	4
(Chile) Ryoki Kamahara	3	0	3	0	9	55	99	3

Group 7

Players	Pld	W	L	GW	GL	PW	PL	Points
(Mexico) Rodrigo Montoya	3	3	0	9	1	108	53	6
(Bolivia) Carlos Keller	3	2	1	7	3	98	91	5
(Chile) Rafael Gatica	3	1	2	3	7	85	98	4
(India) Vineet Singh	3	0	3	1	9	61	110	3

=== Medal round ===
Round of 16
9	(Canada) Lee Connell	8	8	5
8	(Bolivia) Carlos Keller	11	11	11
5	(Mexico) Daniel De La Rosa	12	16	11	8	7
12	(Guatemala) Edwin Galicia	10	14	9	11	11
13	(Costa Rica) Andrés Acuña	11	11	11
4	(Canada) Kurtis Cullen	6	6	2
3	(United States) Alejandro Landa	11	11	4	11
6	(Ecuador) Juan Francisco Cueva	8	5	11	5
11	(Japan) Michimune Kono	4	4	9
6	(Bolivia) Conrrado Moscoso	11	11	11
7	(Mexico) Rodrigo Montoya	11	11	11
10	(Guatemala) Juan Salvatierra	5	8	6

Quarterfinals
1	(United States) Rocky Carson	11	11	10	11
8	(Bolivia) Carlos Keller	8	5	12	4
12	(Guatemala) Edwin Galicia	11	4	11	5	3
13	(Costa Rica) Andrés Acuña	8	11	7	11	11
3	(United States) Alejandro Landa	11	6	12
6	(Bolivia) Conrrado Moscoso	15	15	15
7	(Mexico) Rodrigo Montoya	11	13	11
2	(Ecuador) José Daniel Ugalde	4	11	2

Semifinals
1	(United States) Rocky Carson	8	7	11	12	11
13	(Costa Rica) Andrés Acuña	11	11	7	10	4
6	(Bolivia) Conrrado Moscoso	11	11	11
7	(Mexico) Rodrigo Montoya	4	2	6

Final
1	(United States) Rocky Carson	11	7	4	8
6	(Bolivia) Conrrado Moscoso	8	11	11	11
