= 2021 Racquetball World Championships – Women's doubles =

- XIX Racquetball World Championships: Costa Rica 2018 -
| Host | Guatemala City, Guatemala |
| Dates | August 10–18 |
- Men's singles
- Women's singles
- Men's doubles
- Women's doubles
| Gold | (Mexico) Paola Longoria & Samantha Salas |
| Silver | (United States) Erika Manilla & Rhonda Rajsich |
| Bronze | (Guatemala) Maria Rene Rodriguez & Gabriela Martínez (Argentina) Valeria Centellas & Natalia Mendez |

The International Racquetball Federation's 20th Racquetball World Championships were held in Guatemala City, Guatemala from November 26 to December 6, 2021. This was the first time that Worlds had been held in Guatemala, and was the second consecutive time a Central American country had hosted the event, after Costa Rica in 2018.

In 2021, Mexicans Paola Longoria and Samantha Salas won their fourth World Championship in women's doubles, which is the most by a partnership. They are now tied for second most Worlds doubles titles with fellow Mexicans Álvaro Beltrán and Javier Moreno. Longoria and Salas defeated Americans Kelani Lawrence and Rhonda Rajsich in the final, 15–14, 15–6.

== Tournament format ==
The 2021 World Championships was a two-stage competition. There was an initial group stage played as a round robin, with the results used to seed teams for the medal round.

== Group stage ==
=== Pool A ===
| Players | Pld | W | L | GF | GA | PF | PA | Points |
|---|---|---|---|---|---|---|---|---|
| (Mexico) Paola Longoria & Samantha Salas | 2 | 2 | 0 | 4 | 0 | 60 | 26 | 4 |
| (Guatemala) Gabriela Martínez & Maria Renee Rodriguez | 2 | 1 | 1 | 2 | 2 | 52 | 34 | 3 |
| (Chile) Paula Mansilla & Carla Muñoz | 2 | 0 | 2 | 0 | 4 | 8 | 60 | 2 |

=== Pool B ===
| Players | Pld | W | L | GF | GA | PF | PA | Points |
|---|---|---|---|---|---|---|---|---|
| (Argentina) Valeria Centellas & Natalia Mendez | 2 | 2 | 0 | 4 | 0 | 60 | 24 | 4 |
| (United States) Erika Manilla & Rhonda Rajsich | 2 | 1 | 1 | 2 | 2 | 45 | 37 | 3 |
| (Canada) Frédérique Lambert & Alexis Iwaasa | 2 | 0 | 2 | 0 | 4 | 16 | 60 | 2 |

=== Pool C ===
| Players | Pld | W | L | GF | GA | PF | PA | Points |
|---|---|---|---|---|---|---|---|---|
| (Guatemala) Gabriela Martínez & Maria Rene Rodriguez | 3 | 3 | 0 | 6 | 0 | 90 | 34 | 6 |
| (Ecuador) Maria Paz Muñoz & Ana Lucia Sarmiento | 3 | 2 | 1 | 4 | 2 | 67 | 66 | 5 |
| (Colombia) Cristina Amaya & Maria Paz Riquelme | 3 | 1 | 2 | 2 | 4 | 63 | 78 | 4 |
| (Republic of Ireland) Majella Haverty & Katie Kenny | 3 | 0 | 3 | 0 | 6 | 48 | 90 | 3 |

== Medal round ==
Round of 16
1 | (Mexico) Paola Longoria & Samantha Salas
BYE
9 | (Republic of Ireland) Katie Kenny & Antonia Neary | 8, 13
8 | (Chile) Paula Mansilla & Carla Muñoz | 15, 15
5 | (Guatemala) Gabriela Martínez & Maria Renee Rodriguez | 15, 15
12 | BYE
13 | BYE
4 | (Ecuador) Maria Paz Muñoz & Ana Lucia Sarmiento
3 | (Bolivia) Angelica Barrios & Micaela Meneses
BYE
11 | BYE
6 | (United States) Erika Manilla & Rhonda Rajsich
7 | (Canada) Frédérique Lambert & Alexis Iwaasa | 15, 15
10 | (Colombia) Cristina Amaya & Maria Paz Riquelme | 3, 8
15 | BYE
2 | (Argentina) Valeria Centellas & Natalia Mendez

Quarter finals
1 | Mexico | 15, 15
8 | Chile | 1, 4
5 | Guatemala | 15, 15
4 | Ecuador | 0, 2
3 | Bolivia | 10, 5
6 | (United States) USA | 15, 15
7 | Canada | 3, 4
2 | Argentina | 15, 15

Semi finals
1 | Mexico | 15, 15
4 | Guatemala | 9, 4
6 | (United States) USA | 6, 15, 11
2 | Argentina | 15, 9, 8

Finals
1 | Mexico | 15, 15
6 | USA | 14, 6

Winners
(Mexico) Paola Longoria & Samantha Salas
