= 2021 Racquetball World Championships – Women's singles =

- XIX Racquetball World Championships; Costa Rica 2018
Host	Guatemala City, Guatemala
Dates	November 29 – December 6
- Men's singles
- Women's singles
Gold	(Mexico) Paola Longoria
Silver	(United States) Kelani Lawrence
Bronze	(Argentina) Natalia Mendez (United States) Rhonda Rajsich
- Men's doubles
- Women's doubles

The International Racquetball Federation's 20th Racquetball World Championships were held in Guatemala City, Guatemala from November 26 to December 6. This was the first time the Worlds had been held in Guatemala, and the second consecutive time a Central American country had hosted the event, after Costa Rica in 2018.

In 2021, Mexican Paola Longoria won her fourth World Championship in women's singles, which set the record for most titles - one more than Americans Cheryl Gudinas and Michelle Gould. Longoria defeated American Kelani Lawrence in the final, and Lawrence, as the 11th seed, was a surprise finalist.

== Tournament format ==
The 2021 World Championships used a two-stage format with an initial group stage that was a round robin, with the results used to seed players for a medal round.

== Group stage ==
=== Pool A ===
Player	Pld	W	L	GF	GA	PF	PA	Points
(Mexico) Paola Longoria	2	2	0	4	0	60	22	4
(Ecuador) María Paz Muñoz	2	1	1	2	2	38	45	3
(Bolivia) Micaela Meneses	2	0	2	0	4	29	60	2

=== Pool B ===
Player	Pld	W	L	GF	GA	PF	PA	Points
(Argentina) Maria Jose Vargas	2	2	0	4	1	67	29	4
(United States) Kelani Lawrence	2	1	1	3	2	57	48	3
(South Korea) Lee Sumin	2	0	2	0	4	13	68	2

=== Pool C ===
Player	Pld	W	L	GF	GA	PF	PA	Points
(Bolivia) Angelica Barrios	3	3	0	6	0	90	29	6
(Mexico) Samantha Salas	3	2	1	4	2	76	41	5
(Ecuador) María José Muñoz	3	1	2	2	4	47	72	4
(Republic of Ireland) Majella Haverty	3	0	3	0	6	19	90	3

=== Pool D ===
Player	Pld	W	L	GF	GA	PF	PA	Points
(Argentina) Natalia Mendez	3	3	0	6	0	90	39	6
(Colombia) Cristina Amaya	3	2	1	4	3	80	71	5
(Republic of Ireland) Aisling Hickey	3	1	2	3	4	76	83	4
(Venezuela) Lilian Zea	3	0	3	0	6	37	90	3

=== Pool E ===
Player	Pld	W	L	GF	GA	PF	PA	Points
(Chile) Carla Muñoz	3	3	0	6	0	90	41	6
(Guatemala) María Renee Rodríguez	3	2	1	4	2	76	56	5
(Dominican Republic) Merynanyelly Delgado	3	1	2	2	4	61	75	4
(Canada) Juliette Parent	3	0	3	0	6	35	90	3

=== Pool F ===
Player	Pld	W	L	GF	GA	PF	PA	Points
(Guatemala) Gabriela Martinez	3	3	0	6	0	90	8	6
(Canada) Michèle Morissette	3	2	1	4	3	72	66	5
(Colombia) María Paz Riquelme	3	1	2	2	5	49	90	4
(Japan) Ayako Hanashi	3	0	3	2	6	55	102	3

== Medal round ==
Round of 32
1	(Mexico) Paola Longoria
32	BYE
17	(Colombia) María Paz Riquelme	8, 5
16	(Ecuador) María José Muñoz	15, 15
9	(Mexico) Samantha Salas
24	BYE
25	BYE
8	(Canada) Michèle Morissette
5	(Guatemala) Gabriela Martinez
BYE
21	(Republic of Ireland) Majella Haverty	3, 5
12	(Ecuador) María Paz Muñoz	15, 15
13	(South Korea) Lee Sumin	15, 15
20	(Japan) Ayako Hanashi	9, 4
29	BYE
4	(Argentina) Natalia Mendez
3	(Bolivia) Angelica Barrios
30	BYE
19	(Canada) Juliette Parent	9, 1
14	(Bolivia) Micaela Meneses	15, 15
11	(United States) Kelani Lawrence	7, 15, 11
22	(Republic of Ireland) Aisling Hickey	15, 12, 5
27	BYE
6	(Chile) Carla Muñoz
7	(Guatemala) María Renee Rodríguez
26	BYE
23	BYE
10	(Colombia) Cristina Amaya
15	(United States) Rhonda Rajsich	14, 15, 11
18	(Dominican Republic) Merynanyelly Delgado	15, 3, 5
31	BYE
2	(Argentina) Maria Jose Vargas

Round of 16
1	(Mexico) Paola Longoria	15, 15
17	(Ecuador) María José Muñoz	0, 1
9	(Mexico) Samantha Salas	15, 15
8	(Canada) Michèle Morissette	0, 2
5	(Guatemala) Gabriela Martinez	15, 15
12	(Ecuador) María Paz Muñoz	1, 14
13	(South Korea) Lee Sumin	3, 3
4	(Argentina) Natalia Mendez	15, 15
3	(Bolivia) Angelica Barrios	13, 15, 11
14	(Bolivia) Micaela Meneses	15, 7, 3
11	(United States) Kelani Lawrence	15, 15
6	(Chile) Carla Muñoz	8, 13
7	(Guatemala) María Renee Rodríguez	15, 15
10	(Colombia) Cristina Amaya	13, 10
15	(United States) Rhonda Rajsich	5, 15, 11
2	(Argentina) Maria Jose Vargas	15, 5, 10

Quarterfinals
1	(Mexico) Paola Longoria	15, 15
9	(Mexico) Samantha Salas	13, 5
5	(Guatemala) Gabriela Martinez	15, 10, 7
4	(Argentina) Natalia Mendez	9, 15, 11
3	(Bolivia) Angelica Barrios	13, 11
11	(United States) Kelani Lawrence	15, 15
7	(Guatemala) Maria Renee Rodriguez	7, 1
15	(United States) Rhonda Rajsich	15, 15

Semi finals
1	(Mexico) Paola Longoria	15, 15
4	(Argentina) Natalia Mendez	10, 1
11	(United States) Kelani Lawrence	15, 15
15	(United States) Rhonda Rajsich	12, 7

Finals
1	(Mexico) Paola Longoria	15, 15
11	(United States) Kelani Lawrence	6, 1

Women's singles winner
(Mexico) Paola Longoria
