= Racquetball at the 2017 Bolivarian Games =

- Dates: 19–25 November 2017
- Nations: 8

Racquetball (Spanish: Ráquetbol), for the 2017 Bolivarian Games was held from 20 November to 25 November 2017 in Santa Marta, Colombia.

== Tournament format ==
The 2017 Bolivarian Games racquetball competition has two-stages. There is an initial group stage played as a round robin with the results used to seed teams for the medal round. The group stage begins November 20 for three days followed by the medal round with the finals on November 25. The racquetball venue is Parque Deportivo Bolivarianno.

== Participating nations ==
A total of 8 countries have entered athletes.

Bolivia - 8 athletes
Chile - 3
Colombia - 6
Dominican Republic - 4
Ecuador- 5
Guatemala - 5
Venezuela - 7
Peru - 3

== Medal table ==
Rank	Nation	Gold	Silver	Bronze	Total
1	Bolivia (BOL)	4	2	2	8
2	Colombia (COL)	2	0	2	4
3	Guatemala (GUA)	0	2	0	2
4	Ecuador (ECU)	0	1	4	5
5	Dominican Republic (DOM)	0	1	1	2
6	Chile (CHI)	0	0	2	2
Totals (6 entries)		6	6	11	23

== Medalists ==
Event	Gold	Silver	Bronze
Men's singles	Sebastian Franco; Colombia	Conrrado Moscoso; Bolivia	Carlos Keller; Bolivia
Men's singles	Sebastian Franco; Colombia	Conrrado Moscoso; Bolivia	Fernando Rios; Ecuador
Women's singles	Cristina Amaya; Colombia	Jenny Daza; Bolivia	Brenda Laime; Bolivia
Women's singles	Cristina Amaya; Colombia	Jenny Daza; Bolivia	Carla Muñoz; Chile
Men's doubles	Bolivia; Conrrado Moscoso; Roland Keller	Dominican Republic; Luis Pérez; Ramón de León	Ecuador; Fernando Rios; José Daniel Ugalde
Men's doubles	Bolivia; Conrrado Moscoso; Roland Keller	Dominican Republic; Luis Pérez; Ramón de León	Chile; Johan Adasme; Francisco Troncoso
Women's doubles	Bolivia; Jenny Daza; Stefanny Barrios	Guatemala; Ana Martinez; María Rodríguez	Ecuador; María Paz Muñoz; Ana Lucía Sarmiento
Men's team	Bolivia; Conrrado Moscoso; Roland Keller; Carlos Keller; Cristhian Mina	Ecuador; Fernando Rios; José Daniel Ugalde	Colombia; Alejandro Herrera; Sebastian Franco; Mario Mercado; Set Cubillos
Men's team	Bolivia; Conrrado Moscoso; Roland Keller; Carlos Keller; Cristhian Mina	Ecuador; Fernando Rios; José Daniel Ugalde	Dominican Republic; Luis Pérez; Ramón de León
Women's team	Bolivia; Jenny Daza; Stefanny Barrios; Brenda Laime; Valeria Centellas	Guatemala; Ana Martinez; Maria Renee Rodriguez	Colombia; Cristina Amaya; Adriana Riveros; María Paz Riquelme
Women's team	Bolivia; Jenny Daza; Stefanny Barrios; Brenda Laime; Valeria Centellas	Guatemala; Ana Martinez; Maria Renee Rodriguez	Ecuador; María Paz Muñoz; María José Muñoz; Ana Lucía Sarmiento

== Women’s Singles ==
=== Pool A ===
Players	Pld	W	L	GF	GA	PF	PA	Points
(Bolivia) Brenda Laime	2	2	0	4	2	65	66	4
(Ecuador) Maria Paz Muñoz	2	1	1	3	3	72	62	3
(Venezuela) Mariana Tobon	2	0	2	2	4	64	73	2

=== Pool B ===
Players	Pld	W	L	GF	GA	PF	PA	Points
(Guatemala) Maria Renee Rodriguez	2	1	1	2	3	46	63	3
(Chile) Carla Muñoz	2	1	1	3	2	63	40	3
(Colombia) Cristina Amaya	2	1	1	3	3	366	72	3

=== Pool C ===
Players	Pld	W	L	GF	GA	PF	PA	Points
(Bolivia) Jenny Daza	2	2	0	4	1	66	43	4
(Dominican Republic) Merynanyelly Delgado	2	1	1	1	2	61	55	1
(Ecuador) Maria Jose Muñoz	2	0	2	0	4	31	60	1

=== Pool D ===
Players	Pld	W	L	GF	GA	PF	PA	Points
(Guatemala) Gabriela Martinez	3	3	0	6	1	92	30	6
(Venezuela) Paola Guerra	3	1	2	2	5	53	96	4
(Dominican Republic) Alejandra Jimenez	3	0	3	1	6	45	97	3
(Colombia) Adriana Riveros	-	-	-	-	-	-	-	-

=== Medal Round ===
First Round
9	(Dominican Republic) Alejandra Jimenez	9	11
8	(Dominican Republic) Merynanyelly Delgado	15	15
5	(Venezuela) Mariana Tobon	11	11
12	(Colombia) Cristina Amaya	15	15
13	(Venezuela) Paola Guerra	0	1
4	(Guatemala) Gabriela Martinez	15	15
11	(Guatemala) Maria Renee Rodriguez	11	15	11
6	(Ecuador) Maria Paz Muñoz	15	8	5
7	(Colombia) Adriana Riveros	15	15
10	(Ecuador) Maria Paz Muñoz	4	2

Quarterfinals
1	(Bolivia) Brenda Laime	15	14	11
8	(Dominican Republic) Merynanyelly Delgado	6	15	4
12	(Colombia) Cristina Amaya	15	15
4	(Guatemala) Gabriela Martinez	8	10
3	(Bolivia) Jenny Daza	15	15
11	(Guatemala) Maria Renee Rodriguez	12	8
7	(Colombia) Adriana Riveros	7	3
2	(Chile) Carla Muñoz	15	15

Semi-finals
1	(Bolivia) Brenda Laime	4	5
12	(Colombia) Cristina Amaya	15	15
3	(Bolivia) Jenny Daza	15	15
2	(Chile) Carla Muñoz	11	4

Final
12	(Colombia) Cristina Amaya	15	15
3	(Bolivia) Jenny Daza	12	11

== Men’s Singles ==
=== Pool A ===
Players	Pld	W	L	GF	GA	PF	PA	Points
(Bolivia) Conrrado Moscoso	2	2	0	4	0	60	12	4
(Dominican Republic) Luis Perez	2	2	0	4	1	70	40	4
(Guatemala) Juan Jose Salvatierra	2	0	2	1	4	36	70	2
(Peru) Jose Luis Ponce	2	0	2	0	4	16	60	2

=== Pool B ===
Players	Pld	W	L	GF	GA	PF	PA	Points
(Colombia) Sebastian Franco	2	2	0	4	0	60	19	4
(Ecuador) Fernando Rios	2	1	1	2	2	43	33	3
(Chile) Francisco Troncoso	2	1	1	2	2	36	47	3
(Venezuela) Luis Zea	2	0	2	0	4	20	60	2

=== Pool C ===
Players	Pld	W	L	GF	GA	PF	PA	Points
(Bolivia) Carlos Keller	2	2	0	4	0	60	11	4
(Dominican Republic) Ramon De Leon	2	1	1	3	2	49	38	3
(Ecuador) Edwin Galicia	2	1	1	2	3	42	49	3
(Peru) Sebastian Mendigui Tuesta	2	0	2	0	4	7	60	2

=== Pool D ===
Players	Pld	W	L	GF	GA	PF	PA	Points
(Colombia) Mario Mercado	2	2	0	4	0	60	24	4
(Chile) Johan Adasme	2	1	1	2	2	36	41	3
(Ecuador) Jose Daniel Ugalde	2	1	1	2	3	55	66	3
(Venezuela) Cesar Castillo	2	0	2	1	4	47	67	2

== Playoffs ==
First Round
1	(Bolivia) Conrrado Moscoso	15	15
8	(Venezuela) Luis Zea	5	2
9	(Venezuela) Cesar Castillo	14	4
8	(Guatemala) Edwin Galicia	15	15
5	(Ecuador) Fernando Rios	15	15
12	(Guatemala) Juan Jose Salvatierra	0	13
13	(Peru) Sebastian Mendiguri Tuesta	1	0
4	(Colombia) Mario Mercado	15	15
3	(Bolivia) Carlos Keller	15	15
4	(Chile) Johan Adasme	4	6
11	(Chile) Francisco Troncoso	5	14
6	(Dominican Republic) Luis Perez	15	15
7	(Ecuador) Jose Daniel Ugalde	15	15
10	(Dominican Republic) Ramon De Leon	2	11
15	(Peru) Jose Luis Ponce	2	5
2	(Colombia) Sebastian Franco	15	15

Quarterfinals
1	(Bolivia) Conrrado Moscoso	15	15
8	(Guatemala) Edwin Galicia	7	10
5	(Ecuador) Fernando Rios	15	7	11
4	(Colombia) Mario Mercado	3	15	7
3	(Bolivia) Carlos Keller	15	15
6	(Dominican Republic) Luis Perez	10	2
7	(Ecuador) Jose Daniel Ugalde	4	12
2	(Colombia) Sebastian Franco	15	15

Semifinals
1	(Bolivia) Conrrado Moscoso	14	15	11
12	(Ecuador) Fernando Rios	15	4	5
3	(Bolivia) Carlos Keller	14	15	4
2	(Colombia) Sebastian Franco	15	11	11

Final
1	(Bolivia) Conrrado Moscoso	10	13
3	(Colombia) Sebastian Franco	15	15

== Women’s Doubles ==
=== Pool A ===
Players	Pld	W	L	GF	GA	PF	PA	Points
(Colombia) Cristina Amaya & Adriana Riveros	2	2	0	4	1	68	41	4
(Dominican Republic) Merynanyelly Delgado & Alejandra Jimenez	1	0	1	0	2	6	30	1
(Ecuador) Maria Jose Muñoz & Maria Paz Muñoz	1	0	1	1	2	35	38	1

=== Pool B ===
Players	Pld	W	L	GF	GA	PF	PA	Points
(Guatemala) Gabriela Martinez & Maria Renee Rodriguez	2	2	0	4	0	60	20	4
(Bolivia) Jenny Daza & Stefanny Barrios	1	0	1	0	2	18	30	1
(Venezuela) Mariana Tobon & Lilian Zea	1	0	1	0	2	2	30	1

=== Medal Round ===
Quarterfinals
November 23
Bolivia Jenny Daza & Stefanny Barrios	15, 15
Dominican Republic Merynanyelly Delgado & Alejandra Jimenez	8, 8
November 23
Ecuador Maria Jose Muñoz & Maria Paz Muñoz	7, 14, 5
Venezuela Mariana Tobon & Lilian Zea	15, 14, 5

Semifinals
November 24
Colombia Cristina Amaya & Adriana Riveros	-
Bolivia	-
November 24
Ecuador	13, 3
Guatemala Gabriela Martinez & Maria Renee Rodriguez	15, 15

Final
November 25
Bolivia	15, 4, 11
Guatemala	14, 15, 9

== Men’s Doubles ==
=== Pool A ===
Players	Pld	W	L	GF	GA	PF	PA	Points
(Colombia) Mario Mercado & Sebastian Franco	2	2	0	4	0	60	18	4
(Bolivia) Roland Keller & Conrrado Moscoso	2	1	1	2	2	45	37	3
(Dominican Republic) Luis Perez & Ramon De Leon	2	1	1	2	2	37	36	3
(Peru) Jose Luis Ponce & Oscar Navarro	2	0	2	0	4	9	60	2

=== Pool B ===
Players	Pld	W	L	GF	GA	PF	PA	Points
(Ecuador) Fernando Rios & Jose Daniel Ugalde	2	2	0	4	0	60	18	4
(Guatemala) Edwin Galicia & Christian Wer	2	2	0	4	0	60	28	4
(Chile) Johan Adasme & Francisco Troncoso	2	0	2	0	4	28	60	2
(Venezuela) Jose Luis Ponce & Oscar Navarro	2	0	2	0	4	18	60	2

=== Medal Round ===
Quarterfinals
November 23
Colombia Mario Mercado & Sebastian Franco	-
Chile Johan Adasme & Francisco Troncoso	-
November 23
Dominican Republic Luis Perez & Ramon De Leon	15, 15
Guatemala Edwin Galicia & Christian Wer	9, 8
November 23
Bolivia Roland Keller & Conrrado Moscoso	15, 15
Venezuela Jose Luis Ponce & Oscar Navarro	8, 2
November 23
Ecuador Fernando Rios & Jose Daniel Ugalde	15, 15
Peru Jose Luis Ponce & Oscar Navarro	1, 1

Semifinals
November 24
Chile	-
Dominican Republic	-
November 24
Bolivia	15, 15
Ecuador	12, 5

Final
November 25
Dominican Republic	1, 3
Bolivia	15, 15
