= 2022 Pan American Racquetball Championships =

The 2022 Pan American Championships were held in Santa Cruz de la Sierra, Bolivia, April 9-16. Bolivian Angélica Barrios won Women's Singles and fellow Bolivian Conrrado Moscoso won Men's Singles, and both Barrios and Moscoso won for the first time. Barrios's victory was the first for a Bolivian woman at Pan Am Championships, while Moscoso's win was the third consecutive Bolivian gold in Men's Singles, as Carlos Keller won the previous two events.

In doubles, Canadians Coby Iwaasa and Samuel Murray won Men's Doubles, which was the 4th Canadian win in the event, but the first for both Iwaasa and Murray. Argentina won Women's Doubles for the first time, as Natalia Mendez and Maria Jose Vargas took the title. It was Mendez's first Pan Am Championship, but the second for Vargas, who won Women's Singles in 2014.

The 2022 Pan American Championships were the first to use rally scoring, which was adopted by the International Racquetball Federation in early 2022. Also, Mixed Doubles and Men's and Women's Team competitions were implemented for the first time. In the team competitions, countries compete head-to-head over three matches: two singles matches and a doubles match. Argentina and Bolivia were the first team champions: Argentina winning the Women's Team competition and Bolivia the Men's Team competition. Mexicans Rodrigo Montoya and Samantha Salas were the first Mixed Doubles Pan American Champions.

== Tournament format ==
The competition had seven events: five individual events and two team events. The individual events were played first: Men’s and Women’s Singles and Doubles and Mixed Doubles. Each individual event had a group stage followed by a medal round. The results of the group stage were used to seed players for the medal round. The group stage began April 9 and concluded April 11. The medal round began April 12 and concluded April 14. The team events were held on April 15 and 16.

== Participating nations ==
A total of 54 athletes (30 men & 24 women) from 12 countries participated.

- Argentina (5)
- Bolivia (6)
- Canada (7)
- Chile (5)
- Colombia (4)
- Costa Rica (4)
- Dominican Republic (2)
- Ecuador (2)
- Guatemala (6)
- Mexico (6)
- Puerto Rico (1)
- United States (6)

== Medal summary ==
=== Medal table ===
Rank	Nation	Gold	Silver	Bronze	Total
1	Bolivia (BOL)	3	1	2	6
2	Argentina (ARG)	2	1	1	4
3	Mexico (MEX)	1	3	1	5
4	Canada (CAN)	1	0	0	1
5	Costa Rica (CRC)	0	1	2	3
6	Ecuador (ECU)	0	1	0	1
7	United States (USA)	0	0	6	6
8	Chile (CHI)	0	0	1	1
8	Guatemala (GUA)	0	0	1	1
Totals (9 entries)		7	7	14	28

=== Medalists ===
Event	Gold	Silver	Bronze
Men's events
Singles	Conrrado Moscoso; Bolivia	Andrés Acuña; Costa Rica	Rodrigo Montoya; Mexico Alejandro Landa; United States
Doubles	Coby Iwaasa; Samuel Murray; Canada	Juan Francisco Cueva; Jose Daniel Ugalde; Ecuador	Jake Bredenbeck; Sam Bredenbeck; United States Andrés Acuña; Gabriel Garcia; Costa Rica
Team	Conrrado Moscoso; Carlos Keller; Kadim Carrasco; Bolivia	Rodrigo Montoya; Elias Nieto; Erick Trujillo; Mexico	Andrés Acuña; Felipe Camacho; Gabriel Garcia; Costa Rica Jake Bredenbeck; Sam Bredenbeck; Alejandro Landa; United States
Women's events
Singles	Angélica Barrios; Bolivia	María José Vargas; Argentina	Gabriela Martinez; Guatemala Carla Muñoz; Chile
Doubles	Natalia Mendez; Maria Jose Vargas; Argentina	Alexandra Herrera; Samantha Salas; Mexico	Micaela Meneses; Yazmine Sabja; Bolivia Erika Manilla; Rhonda Rajsich; United States
Team	Natalia Mendez; Maria Jose Vargas; Argentina	Alexandra Herrera; Samantha Salas; Mexico	Micaela Meneses; Yazmine Sabja; Bolivia Kelani Lawrence; Erika Manilla; Rhonda Rajsich; United States
Mixed events
Doubles	Rodrigo Montoya; Samantha Salas; Mexico	Micaela Meneses; Conrrado Moscoso; Bolivia	Valeria Centellas; Diego Garcia; Argentina Erika Manilla; Alejandro Landa; United States

== Men’s singles ==
=== Preliminary round ===
Group A

Players	Pld	W	L	GW	GL	PW	PL	Points
(Bolivia) Conrrado Moscoso	2	2	0	4	0	124	104	4
(Costa Rica) Andrés Acuña	2	1	1	5	3	106	95	3
(Guatemala) Juan Salvatierra	2	0	2	1	6	72	103	2

Group B

Players	Pld	W	L	GW	GL	PW	PL	Points
(United States) Alejandro Landa	2	2	0	6	1	100	68	4
(Ecuador) Juan Francisco Cueva	2	1	1	4	4	103	92	3
(Dominican Republic) Ramón de León	2	0	2	1	6	60	103	2

Group C

Players	Pld	W	L	GW	GL	PW	PL	Points
(Bolivia) Carlos Keller	3	3	0	9	0	135	86	6
(Costa Rica) Felipe Camacho	3	2	1	6	4	127	101	5
(Guatemala) Edwin Galicia	3	1	2	4	6	117	111	4
(Chile) Tomás Oyhanart	3	0	3	0	9	54	135	3

Group D

Players	Pld	W	L	GW	GL	PW	PL	Points
(United States) Jake Bredenbeck	3	3	0	9	1	146	72	6
(Ecuador) Jose Daniel Ugalde	3	2	1	6	3	120	83	5
(Chile) Rodrigo Salgado Jr.	3	1	2	4	6	96	135	4
(Puerto Rico) Abraham Mercado	3	0	3	0	9	63	135	3

Group E

Players	Pld	W	L	GW	GL	PW	PL	Points
(Mexico) Rodrigo Montoya	3	3	0	9	2	154	109	6
(Argentina) Diego Garcia	3	2	1	8	5	175	137	5
(Colombia) Mario Mercado	3	1	2	5	6	129	137	4
(Canada) Trevor Webb	3	0	3	0	9	60	135	3

Group F

Players	Pld	W	L	GW	GL	PW	PL	Points
(Mexico) Elias Nieto	3	3	0	9	2	151	98	6
(Canada) Samuel Murray	3	2	1	7	3	128	100	5
(Colombia) Set Cubillos	3	1	2	3	7	114	127	4
(Chile) Diego Gatica	3	0	3	2	9	94	162	3

=== Medal round ===
First Round
9	(Ecuador) Jose Daniel Ugalde	9	12	4
8	(Argentina) Diego Garcia	15	15	15
5	(Mexico) Rodrigo Montoya	15	12	15	15
12	(Ecuador) Juan Francisco Cueva	7	15	12	10
11	(Costa Rica) Andrés Acuña	15	15	15
6	(Mexico) Elias Nieto	8	14	9
7	(Canada) Samuel Murray	15	15	15
10	(Costa Rica) Felipe Camacho	2	2	11

Quarterfinals
1	(Bolivia) Conrrado Moscoso	15	15	15
8	(Argentina) Diego Garcia	9	10	13
5	(Mexico) Rodrigo Montoya	15	15	15
4	(United States) Jake Bredenbeck	9	8	11
3	(Bolivia) Carlos Keller	11	6	12
11	(Costa Rica) Andrés Acuña	15	15	15
7	(Canada) Samuel Murray	15	9	12	10
2	(United States) Alejandro Landa	15	9	15	15

Semifinals
1	(Bolivia) Conrrado Moscoso	15	15	15
5	(Mexico) Rodrigo Montoya	14	10	13
11	(Costa Rica) Andrés Acuña	15	14	15	15
2	(United States) Alejandro Landa	14	15	12	14

Final
1	(Bolivia) Conrrado Moscoso	15	14	15	15
11	(Costa Rica) Andrés Acuña	14	15	6	13

== Men’s doubles ==
Group A

Players	Pld	W	L	GW	GL	PW	PL	Points
(United States) Jake Bredenbeck & Sam Bredenbeck	2	2	0	6	2	115	101	4
(Bolivia) Kadim Carrasco & Carlos Keller	2	1	1	4	3	100	82	3
(Colombia) Set Cubillos & Mario Mercado	2	0	2	1	6	72	104	2

Group B

Players	Pld	W	L	GW	GL	PW	PL	Points
(Costa Rica) Andrés Acuña & Gabriel Garcia	3	2	0	6	3	127	89	4
(Mexico) Elias Nieto & Erick Trujillo	3	1	1	4	3	90	81	3
(Argentina) Diego Garcia & Tomás Oyhanart	3	0	2	2	6	66	113	2

Group C

Players	Pld	W	L	GW	GL	PW	PL	Points
(Canada) Coby Iwaasa & Samuel Murray	3	3	0	9	1	149	103	6
(Ecuador) Juan Francisco Cueva & Jose Daniel Ugalde	3	2	1	6	3	118	100	5
(Chile) Rafael Gatica & Rodrigo Salgado Jr.	3	1	2	4	8	141	169	4
(Guatemala) Geovani Mendeoza & Juan Salvatierra	3	0	3	2	9	120	156	3

=== Medal Round ===
First Round
9	(Chile) Rafael Gatica & Rodrigo Salgado Jr.	13	5	6
8	(Colombia) Set Cubillos & Mario Mercado	15	15	15
7	(Argentina) Diego Garcia & Tomás Oyhanart	15	7	15	10	11
10	(Guatemala) Geovani Mendoza & Juan Salvatierra	8	15	10	15	6

Quarterfinals
1	(United States) Jake Bredenbeck & Sam Bredenbeck	15	15	15
8	Colombia	14	9	8
5	(Mexico) Elias Nieto & Erick Trujillo	7	9	8
4	(Canada) Coby Iwaasa & Samuel Murray	15	15	15
3	(Ecuador) Juan Francisco Cueva & Jose Daniel Ugalde	15	15	15
6	(Bolivia) Kadim Carrasco & Carlos Keller	13	14	14
7	Argentina	12	10	6
2	(Costa Rica) Andrés Acuña & Gabriel Garcia	15	15	15

Semifinals
1	(United States) USA	13	13	12
4	(Canada) CANADA	15	15	15
3	(Ecuador) ECUADOR	15	15	15
2	(Costa Rica) COSTA RICA	14	8	14

Final
4	(Canada) CANADA	10	15	15	11	11
3	(Ecuador) ECUADOR	15	13	5	15	5

== Women’s singles ==
=== Preliminary round ===
Group A

Players	Pld	W	L	GW	GL	PW	PL	Points
(Argentina) María José Vargas	2	2	0	6	1	104	71	4
(Bolivia) Angélica Barrios	2	1	1	4	4	98	110	3
(Colombia) Cristina Amaya	2	0	2	1	6	81	102	2

Group B

Players	Pld	W	L	GW	GL	PW	PL	Points
(Mexico) Alexandra Herrera	2	2	0	6	0	90	42	4
(United States) Micaela Meneses	2	1	1	3	3	79	68	3
(Colombia) Maria Paz Riquelme	2	0	2	0	6	31	90	2

Group C

Players	Pld	W	L	GW	GL	PW	PL	Points
(Argentina) Natalia Mendez	2	2	0	6	0	90	33	4
(Dominican Republic) Merynanyelly Delgado	2	1	1	3	5	80	111	3
(Guatemala) Andrea Gabriela Reyes Perez	2	0	2	2	6	78	104	2

Group D

Players	Pld	W	L	GW	GL	PW	PL	Points
(Chile) Carla Muñoz	3	3	0	9	2	150	109	6
(United States) Kelani Lawrence	3	2	1	8	4	163	115	5
(Mexico) Angela Veronica Ortega Sabido	3	1	2	4	8	132	163	4
(Canada) Juliette Parent	3	0	3	2	9	97	155	3

Group E

Players	Pld	W	L	GW	GL	PW	PL	Points
(Guatemala) Gabriela Martinez	3	3	0	9	3	172	121	6
(United States) Rhonda Rajsich	3	2	1	7	7	159	176	5
(Costa Rica) Maricruz Ortiz	3	1	2	6	6	149	154	4
(Canada) Michèle Morissette	3	0	3	3	9	135	164	3

=== Medal round ===
First Round
9	(Bolivia) Micaela Meneses	15	15	15
8	(Dominican Republic) Merynanyelly Delgado	7	12	11
7	(United States) Kelani Lawrence	7	15	14	10
10	(Bolivia) Angélica Barrios	15	10	15	15

Quarterfinals
1	(Argentina) Maria Jose Vargas	15	15	15
8	(Bolivia) Micaela Meneses	12	7	11
5	(United States) Rhonda Rajsich	13	15	11	13
4	(Chile) Carla Muñoz	15	10	15	15
3	(Argentina) Natalia Mendez	15	15	11	13	8
6	(Guatemala) Gabriela Martinez	12	14	15	15	11
10	(Bolivia) Angélica Barrios	15	10	15	15
2	(Mexico) Alexandra Herrera	9	15	9	10

Semifinals
1	(Argentina) Maria Jose Vargas	11	15	15	15
4	(Chile) Carla Muñoz	15	11	7	13
3	(Guatemala) Gabriela Martinez	10	15	7	11
10	(Bolivia) Angélica Barrios	15	9	15	15

Final
1	(Argentina) Maria Jose Vargas	15	15	10	14	10
10	(Bolivia) Angélica Barrios	14	10	15	15	12

== Women’s doubles ==
=== Preliminary round ===
Group A

Players	Pld	W	L	GW	GL	PW	PL	Points
(Mexico) Alexandra Herrera & Samantha Salas	3	3	0	9	2	159	109	6
(United States) Erika Manilla & Rhonda Rajsich	3	2	1	7	5	159	142	5
(Bolivia) Micaela Meneses & Yazmine Sabja	3	1	2	6	6	139	138	4
(Canada) Alexis Iwaasa & Cassie Prentice	3	0	3	0	9	67	135	3

Group B

Players	Pld	W	L	GW	GL	PW	PL	Points
(Argentina) Natalia Méndez & María José Vargas	3	3	0	9	1	149	85	6
(Chile) Carla Muñoz & Paula Javiera Mansilla Sid	3	2	1	7	4	132	144	5
(Colombia) Cristina Amaya & Maria Paz Riquelme	3	1	2	4	7	140	138	4
(Guatemala) Anna Paul Aguilar Salvatierra & Andrea Gabriela Reyes Perez	3	0	3	1	9	95	149	3

=== Medal round ===
Quarterfinals
1	(Mexico) Alexandra Herrera & Samantha Salas	15	15	15
8	(Guatemala) Anna Paul Aguilar Salvatierra & Andrea Gabriela Reyes Perez	5	8	3
5	(Bolivia) Micaela Meneses & Yazmine Sabja	15	15	15
4	(Chile) Carla Muñoz & Paula Javiera Mansilla Sid	9	5	11
3	(United States) Erika Manilla & Rhonda Rajsich	15	15	15
6	(Colombia) Cristina Amaya & Maria Paz Riquelme	9	5	11
7	(Canada) Alexis Iwaasa & Cassie Prentice	8	6	11
2	(Argentina) Natalia Mendez & Maria Jose Vargas	15	15	15

Semifinals
1	Mexico	15	7	15	15
5	Bolivia	13	15	14	12
3	(United States) USA	11	15	14	14
2	Argentina	15	12	15	15

Final
1	Mexico	14	15	10	15	9
2	Argentina	15	14	15	8	11

== Mixed doubles ==
Group A

Players	Pld	W	L	GW	GL	PW	PL	Points
(Bolivia) Micaela Meneses & Conrrado Moscoso	2	2	0	6	1	103	65	4
(Argentina) Valeria Centellas & Diego Garcia	2	1	1	4	3	83	86	3
(Dominican Republic) Merynanyelly Delgado & Ramón de León	2	0	2	0	6	55	90	2

Group B

Players	Pld	W	L	GW	GL	PW	PL	Points
(United States) Alejandro Landa & Erika Manilla	2	2	0	6	3	126	110	4
(Mexico) Rodrigo Montoya & Samantha Salas	2	1	1	4	3	92	91	3
(Guatemala) Edwin Garcia & Gabriela Martinez	2	0	2	2	6	97	114	2

Group C

Players	Pld	W	L	GW	GL	PW	PL	Points
(Chile) Carla Muñoz & Rodrigo Salgado Jr.	3	3	0	9	5	183	156	6
(Canada) Coby Iwaasa & Juliette Parent	3	2	1	8	7	188	184	5
(Colombia) Cristina Amaya & Mario Mercado	3	1	2	7	7	176	186	4
(Costa Rica) Felipe Camacho & Maricruz Ortiz	3	0	3	4	9	157	178	3

=== Medal Round ===
First Round
9	(Colombia) Cristina Amaya & Mario Mercado	14	15	12	8
8	(Guatemala) Edwin Galicia & Gabriela Martinez	15	13	15	15
7	(Dominican Republic) Merynanyelly Delgado & Ramón de León	15	15	14	11	5
10	(Costa Rica) Felipe Camacho & Maricruz Ortiz	13	9	15	15	11

Quarterfinals
1	(Bolivia) Micaela Meneses & Conrrado Moscoso	15	15	15
8	Guatemala	10	8	12
5	(Argentina) Valeria Centellas & Diego Garcia	15	15	15
4	(Chile) Carla Muñoz & Rodrigo Salgado Jr.	5	6	12
3	(Canada) Coby Iwaasa & Juliette Parent	6	9	12
6	(Mexico) Rodrigo Montoya & Samantha Salas	15	15	15
10	Costa Rica	6	10	6
2	(United States) Alejandro Landa & Erika Manilla	15	15	15

Semifinals
1	Bolivia	15	15	15
5	Argentina	5	4	5
3	Mexico	15	12	15	15
2	(United States) USA	13	15	8	0 (3 Technicals)

Final
1	Bolivia	12	7	15	12
3	Mexico	15	15	14	15

== Team Competitions ==
=== Men’s Team ===
First Round
9	Chile
8	Colombia
7	Guatemala
10	Argentina

Quarterfinals
Bolivia
Colombia
Canada
Costa Rica
Mexico
Ecuador
Guatemala
(United States) USA

Semifinals
Bolivia	3	3
Costa Rica	1	1
Mexico	3	3
(United States) USA	1	0

Final
Bolivia	3	3
Mexico	0	0

Semi-finals

15 April 2022	BOL	2–0	Costa Rica

Conrrado Moscoso	2–0	Andrés Acuña	11–5, 2-11, 11–2, 11-4
Kadim Carrasco / Conrrado Moscoso	2–0	Andrés Acuña / Felipe Camacho	11–5, 2-11, 11-2, 11–4

15 April 2022	USA	0–2	Mexico

Alejandro Landa	1–3	Rodrigo Montoya	11–3, 11–9, 3-11, 11-7
Jake Bredenbeck / Sam Bredenbeck	0–3	Rodrigo Montoya / Erick Trujillo	11-6, 11-8, 11-7

Final

16 April 2022	BOL	2–0	Mexico

Conrrado Moscoso	3–0	Rodrigo Montoya	11–3, 11–2, 11–8
Carlos Keller	3–0	Elias Nieto	11–6, 11–5, 11–6

=== Women’s Team ===
Quarterfinals
Bolivia
Colombia
Guatemala
Mexico
(United States) USA
Chile
Canada
Argentina

Semifinals
Bolivia	1	1
Mexico	3	3
(United States) USA	3	1	1
Argentina	2	3	3

Final
Mexico	0	2
Argentina	3	3

Semi-finals

15 April 2022	BOL	0–2	Mexico

Micaela Meneses	1–3	Alexandra Herrera	11–5, 2-11, 11–2, 11-4
Micaela Meneses / Yazmine Sabja	1–3	Alexandra Herrera / Samantha Salas	11–5, 2-11, 11-2, 11–4

15 April 2022	ARG	2–1	United States

Natalia Mendez / Maria Jose Vargas	2–3	Erika Manilla / Rhonda Rajsich	11–3, 11–9, 3-11, 11-7
Natalia Mendez	3–1	Kelani Lawrence	11-6, 11-8, 11-7
Maria Jose Vargas	3–1	Rhonda Rajsich

Final

16 April 2022	MEX	0–2	Argentina

Alexandra Herrera	0–3	Maria Jose Vargas	11–9, 11–6, 11–5
Samantha Salas	2–3	Natalia Mendez	2-11, 11–10, 11–8, 8-11, 11–7
