= 2021 Racquetball World Championships – Men's singles =

- XIX Racquetball World Championships: Costa Rica 2018 -
Host	Guatemala City, Guatemala
Dates	November 29-December 6
- Men's singles
Gold	(United States) Alejandro Landa
Silver	(Costa Rica) Andrés Acuña
Bronze	(Bolivia) Conrrado Moscoso (Colombia) Mario Mercado
- Women's singles
- Men's doubles
- Women's doubles

The International Racquetball Federation's 20th Racquetball World Championships were held in Guatemala City, Guatemala from November 26 to December 6. This was the first time that Worlds had been held in Guatemala, and the second consecutive time a Central American country had hosted the event, after Costa Rica in 2018.

American Alejandro Landa won men's singles in Guatemala by defeating Costa Rican Andrés Acuña in the final. Mexico born Landa was representing the USA for the first time at Worlds. Acuña was the surprising finalist, and the first Costa Rican to reach the final. He claimed the 2nd seed position by winning pool B in the group stage of matches, including a win over defending champion Mexican Rodrigo Montoya.

== Tournament format ==
The 2021 World Championships used a two-stage format with an initial group stage that was a round robin, with the results used to seed players for a medal round.

== Group stage ==
=== Pool A ===
Player	Pld	W	L	GF	GA	PF	PA	Points
(United States) Alejandro Landa	2	2	0	4	0	60	21	4
(Dominican Republic) Ramón de León	2	1	1	2	3	41	64	3
(Costa Rica) Felipe Camacho	2	0	2	1	4	43	59	2

=== Pool B ===
Player	Pld	W	L	GF	GA	PF	PA	Points
(Costa Rica) Andrés Acuña	2	2	0	4	0	60	20	4
(Mexico) Rodrigo Montoya	2	1	1	2	2	39	43	4
(Argentina) Shai Manzuri	2	0	2	0	4	24	60	2

=== Pool C ===
Player	Pld	W	L	GF	GA	PF	PA	Points
(United States) Jake Bredenbeck	2	2	0	4	1	67	25	4
(Ecuador) Juan Francisco Cueva	2	1	1	3	2	49	60	3
(South Korea) Kim Mingyu	2	0	2	0	4	29	60	2

=== Pool D ===
Player	Pld	W	L	GF	GA	PF	PA	Points
(Mexico) Andree Parrilla	3	3	0	6	1	94	39	6
(Argentina) Diego García	3	2	1	5	3	97	57	5
(Canada) Francis Guillemette	3	1	2	3	4	58	76	4
(Republic of Ireland) Eoin Tynan	3	0	3	0	6	13	90	3

=== Pool E ===
Player	Pld	W	L	GF	GA	PF	PA	Points
(Bolivia) Conrrado Moscoso	3	3	0	6	0	90	29	6
(Ecuador) Jose Daniel Ugalde	3	2	1	4	2	73	43	5
(South Korea) Lee Gunhee	3	1	2	2	4	49	87	4
(Republic of Ireland) Ken Cottrell	3	0	3	0	6	34	90	3

=== Pool F ===
Player	Pld	W	L	GF	GA	PF	PA	Points
(Colombia) Mario Mercado	3	3	0	6	0	90	36	6
(Guatemala) Juan José Salvatierra	3	2	1	4	3	68	71	5
(Canada) Lee Connell	3	1	2	3	4	78	85	4
(Chile) Rodrigo Salgado	3	0	3	0	6	36	90	3

=== Pool G ===
Player	Pld	W	L	GF	GA	PF	PA	Points
(Bolivia) Luis Aguilar	3	3	0	6	1	96	71	6
(Guatemala) Javier Martinez	3	2	1	2	3	62	81	5
(Colombia) Set Cubillos	3	1	2	4	4	87	80	4
(Chile) Rafael Gatica	3	0	3	1	4	60	73	3

Note: Rafael Gatica replaced Pedro Castro, who was injured in the first match of the group against Javier Martinez after winning game one.

== Medal round ==
Round of 32
1	(United States) Alejandro Landa
32	BYE
17	(Canada) Francis Guillemette	6, 2
16	(Argentina) Shai Manzuri	15, 15
9	(Guatemala) Juan José Salvatierra	15, 15
24	(Chile) Rodrigo Salgado	5, 9
25	(Republic of Ireland) Eoin Tynan	7, 2
8	(Guatemala) Javier Martinez	15, 15
5	(Bolivia) Conrrado Moscoso
28	BYE
21	(Colombia) Set Cubillos	2, 4
12	(Argentina) Diego García	15, 15
13	(Dominican Republic) Ramon de León	15, 15
20	(South Korea) Lee Gunghee	6, 7
29	BYE
4	(Mexico) Andree Parrilla
3	(United States) Jake Bredenbeck
BYE
19	(Canada) Lee Connell	2, 4
14	(Mexico) Rodrigo Montoya	15, 15
11	(Ecuador) Juan Francisco Cueva	15, 15
22	(Chile) Rafael Gatica	3, 11
27	BYE
6	(Colombia) Mario Mercado
7	(Bolivia) Luis Aguilar
26
23	(Republic of Ireland) Ken Cottrell	2, 1
10	(Ecuador) Jose Daniel Ugalde	15, 15
15	(Japan) Harumi Kajino	15, 15
18	(Republic of Ireland) Mingyu Kim	12, 14
31	BYE
2	(Costa Rica) Andrés Acuña

Round of 16
1	(United States) Alejandro Landa	15, 15
16	(Bolivia) Shai Manzuri	6, 9
9	(Guatemala) Juan José Salvatierra	15, 12, 11
8	(Guatemala) Javier Martinez	13, 15, 7
5	(Bolivia) Conrrado Moscoso	7, 15, 11
12	(Argentina) Diego García	15, 4, 6
13	(Dominican Republic) Ramón de León	6, 4
4	(Mexico) Andree Parrilla	15, 15
3	(United States) Jake Bredenbeck	15, 15
14	(Mexico) Rodrigo Montoya	10, 14
11	(Ecuador) Juan Francisco Cueva	15, 6, 2
6	(Colombia) Mario Mercado	14, 15, 11
7	(Bolivia) Luis Aguilar	8, 9
10	(Ecuador) José Daniel Ugalde	15, 15
15	(Costa Rica) Felipe Camacho	5, 2
2	(Costa Rica) Andrés Acuña	15, 15

Quarterfinals
1	(United States) Alejandro Landa	15, 15
9	(Guatemala) Juan José Salvatierra	8, 12
5	(Bolivia) Conrrado Moscoso	15, 15
4	(Mexico) Andree Parrilla	12, 14
3	(United States) Jake Bredenbeck	13, 15, 4
6	(Colombia) Mario Mercado	15, 11, 11
10	(Ecuador) José Daniel Ugalde	6, 2
2	(Costa Rica) Andrés Acuña	15, 15

Semi finals
1	(United States) Alejandro Landa	3, 15, 11
5	(Bolivia) Conrrado Moscoso	15, 8, 6
6	(Colombia) Mario Mercado	15, 12, 9
2	(Costa Rica) Andrés Acuña	12, 15, 11

Finals
1	(United States) Alejandro Landa	15, 15
2	(Costa Rica) Andrés Acuña	6, 6

Winner
(United States) Alejandro Landa
