= Racquetball at the 2019 Pan American Games – Men's singles =

Racquetball – Men's singles at the 2019 Pan American Games
- Venue: Racquetball Courts
- Dates: August 2–7, 2019
- Competitors: 25

Medalists
Gold medal	Rodrigo Montoya	Mexico
Silver medal	Álvaro Beltrán	Mexico
Bronze medal	Conrrado Moscoso	Bolivia
Bronze medal	Mario Mercado	Colombia

The men's singles racquetball competition at the 2019 Pan American Games in Lima, Peru was held between August 2 and 7, 2019 at the Racquetball courts located at the Villa Deportiva Regional del Callao cluster. Rodrigo Montoya of Mexico won gold by defeating team-mate Álvaro Beltrán in the final. This was the 1st gold medal in Men's Singles for a Mexican player in Racquetball at the Pan American Games. USA players had won gold at all previous Pan American Games, but in 2019 no USA players made the podium.

== Schedule ==
All times are Central Standard Time (UTC−6).

Date	Time	Round
August 2, 2019	10:00	Round robin
August 3, 2019	10:00	Round robin
August 4, 2019	10:00	Round robin
August 5, 2019	10:00	Round of 16 & Quarterfinals
August 6, 2019	12:00	Semi-finals
August 7, 2019	10:00	Final

== Group stage ==
The competition begins with a round robin with athletes divided into groups. The top two athletes in each group advanced to the medal round. Groups was announced at the technical meeting the day before the competition begins.

=== Pool A ===
Player	Pld	W	L	GF	GA	PF	PA	Difference
(Bolivia) Conrrado Moscoso	2	1	1	3	3	72	71	1
(Ecuador) Jose Daniel Ugalde	2	1	1	3	3	68	68	0
(Costa Rica) Andrés Acuña	2	1	1	3	3	64	65	-1

=== Pool B ===
Player	Pld	W	L	GF	GA	PF	PA	Difference
(Mexico) Álvaro Beltrán	2	2	0	4	0	60	35	25
(Costa Rica) Felipe Camacho	2	1	1	2	3	58	61	-3
(Ecuador) Fernando Rios	2	0	2	1	4	45	67	-22

=== Pool C ===
Player	Pld	W	L	GF	GA	PF	PA	Difference
(Colombia) Mario Mercado	2	2	0	4	0	60	38	22
(Bolivia) Carlos Keller	2	1	1	2	2	55	33	22
(Guatemala) Juan Salvatierra	2	0	2	0	4	16	60	-44

=== Pool D ===
Player	Pld	W	L	GF	GA	PF	PA	Difference
(Mexico) Rodrigo Montoya	3	3	0	6	0	90	24	66
(Dominican Republic) Ramón de León	3	2	1	4	3	71	67	4
(Cuba) Maykel Moyet	3	1	2	3	4	81	69	12
(Peru) Erik Mendoza	3	0	3	0	6	8	90	-82

=== Pool E ===
Player	Pld	W	L	GF	GA	PF	PA	Difference
(United States) Jake Bredenbeck	3	3	0	6	0	90	43	47
(Colombia) Sebastian Franco	3	2	1	4	2	79	50	29
(Guatemala) Edwin Galicia	3	1	2	2	4	63	69	-6
(Peru) Jonathan Luque	3	0	3	0	6	20	90	-70

=== Pool F ===
Player	Pld	W	L	GF	GA	PF	PA	Difference
(Canada) Samuel Murray	3	3	0	6	1	99	47	52
(Dominican Republic) Luis Pérez	3	2	1	3	5	88	63	25
(Cuba) Enier Chacón	3	1	2	2	4	43	84	-41
(Argentina) Fernando Kurzbard	3	0	3	0	6	54	90	-36

=== Pool G ===
Player	Pld	W	L	GF	GA	PF	PA	Difference
(Canada) Coby Iwaasa	3	3	0	6	2	106	71	35
(United States) Charles Pratt	3	2	1	5	2	95	49	46
(Argentina) Shai Manzuri	3	1	2	3	4	61	80	-19
(Chile) Francisco Troncosco	3	0	3	0	6	28	90	-62

== Playoffs ==
Round of 16
8	Coby Iwaasa (CAN)	9	15	11
9	Sebastian Franco (COL)	15	13	0
5	Jake Bredenbeck (USA)	15	15
12	Ramón de León (DOM)	3	9
13	Felipe Camacho (CRC)	3	4
4	Mario Mercado (COL)	15	15
3	Rodrigo Montoya (MEX)	15	15
14	José Daniel Ugalde (ECU)	0	5
11	Carlos Keller (BOL)	15	10	5
6	Samuel Murray (CAN)	13	15	11
7	Charles Pratt (USA)	13	15	11
10	Luis Pérez (DOM)	15	10	5

Quarterfinals
1	Álvaro Beltrán (MEX)	15	15
8	Coby Iwaasa (CAN)	14	13
5	Jake Bredenbeck (USA)	8	15	8
4	Mario Mercado (COL)	15	8	11
3	Rodrigo Montoya (MEX)	15	15
6	Samuel Murray (CAN)	7	10
7	Charles Pratt (USA)	7	7
2	Conrrado Moscoso (BOL)	15	15

Semifinals
1	Álvaro Beltrán (MEX)	15	15
4	Mario Mercado (COL)	7	5
3	Rodrigo Montoya (MEX)	15	15
2	Conrrado Moscoso (BOL)	14	10

Final
1	Álvaro Beltrán (MEX)	15	6	0
3	Rodrigo Montoya (MEX)	9	15	11
