= Mario Mercado =

Colombian racquetball player

Personal information
- Nationality: Colombian
- Born: January 12, 1995 (age 31) Cochabamba, Bolivia

Sport
- Country: Colombia
- Sport: Racquetball
Medal record
Men's racquetball
Representing Bolivia
World Championships
Bronze medal – third place	2014 Burlington	Doubles
Representing Colombia
World Championships
Bronze medal – third place	2021 Guatemala City	Singles
Bronze medal – third place	2021 Guatemala City	Doubles
Pan American Games
Silver medal – second place	2019 Lima	Team
Bronze medal – third place	2019 Lima	Singles
Central American and Caribbean Games
Silver medal – second place	2018 Barranquilla	Singles
Bronze medal – third place	2018 Barranquilla	Doubles
South American Games
Silver medal – second place	2018 Cochabamba	Singles
Silver medal – second place	2018 Cochabamba	Doubles
Silver medal – second place	2018 Cochabamba	Team

Mario Mercado (born January 12, 1995) is a Bolivian-born Colombian racquetball player. He has won several medals for Colombia, highlighted by a silver medal at the 2019 Pan American Games in the men's team event. He has also won on the International Racquetball Tour.

== Junior years – 2010–14 ==
Mercado was introduced to racquetball at age 10 by his parents. At 14, he stopped playing soccer to concentrate on playing racquetball. At the 2010 International Racquetball Federation (IRF) World Junior Championships, Mercado played Boys' U14 Singles for Bolivia and lost in the Round of 16 to fellow Bolivian Marcelo Vargas, 15–5, 12–15, 11–9. At the 2011 World Junior Championships in Santo Domingo, Dominican Republic, Mercado played Boys’ U16 Singles, and lost to Mexican Ramon Yanez in the quarterfinals, 15–5, 15–14.

Mercado again played Boys’ U16 at the 2012 World Junior Championships in Los Angeles, where he lost in the quarterfinals to Coby Iwaasa, 15–11, 15–11, and also played Boys’ U16 Doubles, losing in the quarters to the US Team of Sawyer Lloyd and Adam Manilla, 15–14, 15–5.

After not playing at World Juniors in 2013, Mercado made his final appearance at the 2014 World Junior Championships in Cali, Colombia, where he won Boys’ U18. He defeated Canadian Coby Iwaasa in the semi-finals, 15–8, 14–15, 11–4, and then fellow Bolivian Conrrado Moscoso in the final, 15–12, 7–15, 11–7. Mercado and Moscoso played together in Boys’ U18 Doubles, losing in the semi-finals to Americans Sawyer Lloyd and Adam Manilla, 15–14, 15–11. So, Mercado medaled in both singles and doubles in his last year of junior eligibility.

Mercado was selected to play for Bolivia at the 2014 Racquetball World Championships in Burlington, Ontario, where he played Men's Doubles with Conrrado Moscoso. They defeated Venezuelans Cesar Castillo and César Castro in the quarterfinals, 10–15, 15–6, 11–9, but lost to Colombians Sebastian Franco and Alejandro Herrera in the semi-finals, 15–11, 15–2, which resulted in a bronze medal.

== Career begins on the International Racquetball Tour – 2015–2018 ==
Mercado has said that "I knew the first time I touched a racquet I wanted to be a professional racquetball player," and he began to make that goal a reality in the 2015–16 International Racquetball Tour (IRT) season. Mercado had such success in that first season that he finished 10th in the rankings. Since then, Mercado has been a tour regular, missing only 4 of 59 events from 2015 to December 2021.

Mercado's first big IRT win came at the 2015 St. Louis Winter Rollout, when he defeated Álvaro Beltrán in the Round of 16, 5–11, 15–13, 11–5, 7–11, 11–4, on a run to his 1st semi-final appearance. But in the semis Mercado lost to Rocky Carson, 11–2, 11–4, 11–0. Mercado also made four other quarterfinals in the 2015–16 season, which helped him finish 10th in the season end rankings. He didn't reach a semi-final in the 2016–17 IRT season, but was in four quarterfinals, and finished 9th in the rankings.

Mercado made a breakthrough in the 2017–18 season, as he reached his first final at the 2017 John Pelham Memorial / Pro Kennex Tournament of Champions in Portland, Oregon, where Mercado defeated Samuel Murray in the semi-finals, 13–11, 11–5, 6–11, 11–5. But he lost the final to Charlie Pratt, 11–4, 11–1, 12–10. Despite the loss, Mercado was the first South American born player to reach an IRT final.

Portland was only Mercado's second time in the semi-finals on tour, and he would get into two more semis in 2017–18, which led to a career high 7th ranking at season's end.

== Playing for Colombia 2018–present ==
Mercado earned three silver medals at the 2018 South American Games in Cochabamba, Bolivia, one each in Men's Singles, Men's Doubles and the Men's Team event. In singles, he defeated Carlos Keller of Bolivia in the semi-finals, 15–8, 15–14, but then lost to the other Bolivian Conrrado Moscoso, 15–10, 11–15, 11–6, in the final. In doubles, Mercado and Sebastian Franco finished second in a five team round robin with their only loss to Moscoso and Roland Keller, 15–11, 15–7. In the Men's Team event, Mercado helped Colombia finish 2nd, beating Ecuador in the semi-finals, but losing to Bolivia in the final.

Mercado played for Colombia at the 2018 Central American and Caribbean Games in Barranquilla, Colombia, where he got the finals in Men's Singles, losing to Mexican Daniel de la Rosa, 9–15, 15–2. 11–5, and reaching the semi-finals in Men's Doubles with Set Cubillos, where they lost to Costa Ricans Andrés Acuña and Felipe Camacho, 15–4, 15–3. In the Men's Team event, Colombia lost in the quarterfinals to Cuba, as Mercado won his match, but he and Cubillos lost in doubles and the final singles match was lost also. So, Mercado came away from Barranquilla with two medals: silver in Men's Singles and bronze in Men's Doubles.

In 2018, Mercado played at the IRF World Championships for Colombia. He played Men's Singles, beating Canadian Coby Iwaasa in the Round of 16, but losing in the quarterfinals to American David Horn, 15–12, 15–6. Mercado also played Men's Doubles at Worlds with Sebastian Franco, and they beat Guatemalans Edwin Galicia and Christian Wer, 15–12, 15–2, in the Round of 16, but lost in the quarterfinals to Americans Rocky Carson and Sudsy Monchik, losing 15–11, 15–13.

Mercado was in another semi-final in the 2018–19 IRT season, when he reached the semis of the 2019 Bolivian Open. He defeated Andree Parrilla in the quarterfinals, 15–7, 15–11, but lost to Rocky Carson in the semis, 15–8, 6–15, 11–6. However, Mercado only had one other quarterfinal appearance that season, so he was ranked 10th at season's end.

Mercado represented Colombia at the 2019 Pan American Racquetball Championships in Barranquilla, Colombia, where he played Men's Singles and Doubles. In singles, he lost in the Round of 16 to Mexican Álvaro Beltrán, 12–15, 15–8, 11–1. In doubles, he and Andrés Gómez lost to Roland Keller and Conrrado Moscoso, 15–3, 15–5, in the quarterfinals.

At the 2019 Pan American Games in Lima, Peru, Mercado was part of the silver medal Colombian Men's Team in the Men's Team event, which was Colombia's first racquetball silver medal at the Pan Am Games. They beat the Canada in the quarterfinals, 2–0, then defeated Mexico in the semi-finals, 2–1, before falling to Bolivia in three matches in the final, 2–1. In the final, Mercado defeated Carlos Keller but they lost in doubles and team-mate Sebastian Franco lost to Conrrado Moscoso.

Mercado also played Men's Singles in Lima, earning a bronze medal, as he reached the semi-finals with a win over American Jake Bredenbeck in the quarterfinals, 15–8, 8–15, 11–8, but in the semis, he lost to Mexican Álvaro Beltrán, 15–7, 15–5.

In the 2019–20 season, Mercado reached his 2nd final at the 22nd Annual Lou Bradley Memorial Pro-Am in Sun Prairie, Wisconsin. He reached the final with a win over Alejandro Landa, 15–14, 15–11, in the semi-finals, but Kane Waselenchuk defeated Mercado in the final, 15–2, 15–3. Yet, Mercado only made it past the Round of 16 three times that season with the other two being quarterfinal losses, and that led to a 13th ranking at season's end, which was the first time he was ranked outside the top 10 while playing the IRT full time.

Mercado won his 1st IRT title in November 2021, when he won the Arizona Open in Tempe, Arizona. In Tempe, Mercado beat Alejandro Landa in the quarterfinals, 15–5, 15–9, Rocky Carson in the semi-finals, 5–15, 15–13, 11–10, and Daniel de la Rosa in the final, 6–15, 15–12, 11–0. Mercado is the third South American and second Bolivian born player (after Conrrado Moscoso) to win an IRT event.

At the 2022 Pan American Racquetball Championships in Santa Cruz de la Sierra, Bolivia, Mercado played three divisions: Men's Singles and Men's Doubles as well as Mixed Doubles, which was offered for the first time in 2022. However, Mercado didn't reach the podium in Santa Cruz. In Men's Singles, he lost two of his group stage matches – to Argentine Diego Garcia and Mexican Rodrigo Montoya – which meant that he didn't qualify for the medal round, although Mercado did win the consolation playoff. In Men's Doubles, Mercado and Set Cubillos lost in the quarterfinals to American brothers Jake Bredenbeck and Sam Bredenbeck, 15–14, 15–9, 15–8. Finally, in Mixed Doubles with Cristina Amaya, Mercado lost in the Round of 16 to Guatemalans Edwin Galicia and Gabriela Martínez, 15–14, 13–15, 15–12, 15–8.

=== Career record ===
This table lists Mercado's results across annual events.

Event	2015	2016	2017	2018	2019	2020	2021
US Open	64	32	16	QF	32	P	16
IRT Ranking	10	9	7	10	13		

Note: W = winner, F = finalist, SF = semi-finalist, QF = quarterfinalist, 16 = Round of 16. P = pandemic cancelled event.

== Personal life ==
Mercado moved to Colombia in 2015, and now plays for his adopted country. He has been living in Orlando, Florida to train and serve as his base to play the IRT.

== See also ==
- List of racquetball players
