= Racquetball at the 2018 South American Games =

- Venue: Complejo Polifuncional de Sarco
- Location: (Bolivia) Cochabamba
- Dates: 27 May – 3 June
- Competitors: 25 from 6 nations

Racquetball (Spanish: Ráquetbol), for the 2018 South American Games was held from 27 May to 3 June 2018 in Cochabamba, Bolivia.

== Tournament format ==
The 2018 South American Games racquetball competition has two parts. The individual competitions in Men’s and Women’s Singles and Doubles, and a Team competition. The individual competitions will be held first beginning on May 27 and concluding on June 1. Three of the individual competitions will have a group stage followed by an elimination stage to determine the medalists. The exception is Men’s Doubles, which will be a five country round robin competition. The Team competition will be June 2 and 3. The racquetball venue is Complejo Polifuncional de Sarco.

== Participating nations ==
- Argentina (3)
- Bolivia (7)
- Chile (3)
- Colombia (4)
- Ecuador (5)
- Peru (3)

== Medal summary ==
=== Medal table ===
Rank	Nation	Gold	Silver	Bronze	Total
1	Bolivia (BOL)	3	3	1	7
2	Argentina (ARG)	3	0	0	3
3	Colombia (COL)	0	3	3	6
4	Ecuador (ECU)	0	0	5	5
5	Chile (CHI)	0	0	3	3
Totals (5 entries)		6	6	12	24

=== Medalists ===
Event	Gold	Silver	Bronze
Men's events
Singles	Conrrado Moscoso; Bolivia	Mario Mercado; Colombia	José Ugalde; Ecuador Carlos Keller; Bolivia
Doubles	Roland Keller; Conrrado Moscoso; Bolivia	Sebastian Franco; Mario Mercado; Colombia	José Ugalde; Juan Cueva; Ecuador Francisco Troncoso; Rodrigo Salgado; Chile
Team	Bolivia; Carlos Keller; Roland Keller; Conrrado Moscoso	Colombia; Sebastian Franco; Mario Mercado	Chile; Rodrigo Salgado; Francisco Troncoso Ecuador; Juan Cueva; José Ugalde
Women's events
Singles	María José Vargas; Argentina	Yasmine Sabja; Bolivia	Carla Muñoz; Chile Cristina Amaya; Colombia
Doubles	María José Vargas; Natalia Méndez; Argentina	Jenny Daza; Stefanny Barrios; Bolivia	Cristina Amaya; Carolina Gómez; Colombia Maria Jose Muñoz; Ana Sarmiento; Ecuador
Team	Argentina; Natalia Méndez; María José Vargas	Bolivia; Stefanny Barrios; Valeria Centellas; Jenny Daza; Yasmine Sabja	Ecuador; Maria Jose Muñoz; Ana Sarmiento Colombia; Cristina Amaya; Carolina Gómez

== Men’s singles ==
=== Preliminary round ===
Pool A

Players	Pld	W	L	GW	GL	PW	PL	Points
(Bolivia) Carlos Keller	2	2	0	4	1	68	41	4
(Colombia) Sebastian Franco	2	1	1	3	2	61	43	3
(Chile) Rodrigo Salgado	2	0	2	0	4	15	60	2

Pool B

Players	Pld	W	L	GW	GL	PW	PL	Points
(Ecuador) Jose Daniel Ugalde	3	3	0	6	1	90	41	6
(Colombia) Mario Mercado	3	2	1	5	2	83	49	5
(Chile) Francisco Troncoso	3	1	2	2	4	56	62	4
(Peru) Jonathan Luque	3	0	3	0	6	13	90	3

Pool C

Players	Pld	W	L	GW	GL	PW	PL	Points
(Bolivia) Conrrado Moscoso	3	3	0	6	0	90	17	6
(Ecuador) Christian Chavez	3	2	1	4	3	75	69	5
(Argentina) Fernando Kurzbard	3	1	2	3	4	69	70	4
(Peru) Oscar Carrión	3	0	3	0	6	12	90	3

=== Medal round ===
First Round
9	(Chile) Francisco Troncoso	w/o
8	(Chile) Rodrigo Salgado
11	(Peru) Jonathan Luque	3	1
6	(Colombia) Sebastian Franco	15	15
7	(Argentina) Fernando Kurzbard	15	15
10	(Peru) Oscar Carrión	1	2

Quarterfinals
1	(Bolivia) Carlos Keller	15	14	11
9	(Chile) Francisco Troncoso	5	15	1
5	(Colombia) Mario Mercado	15	15
4	(Ecuador) Christian Chavez	5	1
3	(Bolivia) Conrrado Moscoso	15	15
6	(Colombia) Sebastian Franco	3	0
7	(Argentina) Fernando Kurzbard	6	1
2	(Ecuador) Jose Daniel Ugalde	15	15

Semifinals
1	(Bolivia) Carlos Keller	8	14
5	(Colombia) Mario Mercado	15	15
3	(Bolivia) Conrrado Moscoso	15	15
2	(Ecuador) Jose Daniel Ugalde	4	4

Final
5	(Colombia) Mario Mercado	10	15	6
3	(Bolivia) Conrrado Moscoso	15	11	11

== Men’s doubles ==
Pos	Players	Pld	W	L	GW	GL	PW	PL	Points
1st place, gold medalist(s)	(Bolivia) Roland Keller / Conrrado Moscoso	4	4	0	8	0	120	40	8
2nd place, silver medalist(s)	(Colombia) Mario Mercado / Sebastian Franco	4	3	1	6	2	108	61	7
3rd place, bronze medalist(s)	(Ecuador) Juan Cueva / Jose Daniel Ugalde	4	2	2	4	4	87	70	6
(bronze) 4	(Chile) Rodrigo Salgado / Francisco Troncoso	4	1	3	2	6	59	95	5
5	(Peru) Juan Carlos Zamora / Oscar Carrión	4	0	4	0	8	12	120	4

== Men's team ==
Quarterfinal
1 June
Peru	0
Chile	2

Semifinals
2 June
Bolivia	2
Chile	0
2 June
Ecuador	0
Colombia	2

Final
3 June
Bolivia	2
Colombia	0

Quarterfinal

1 June 2018	Peru	0–2	Chile

Oscar Carrión	0–2	Francisco Troncoso	1–15, 1–15
Juan Zamora	0–2	Rodrigo Salgado	3–15, 1–15
Jonathan Luque / Juan Zamora	Francisco Troncoso / Rodrigo Salgado	not played

Semifinals

2 June 2018	Bolivia	2–0	Chile

Conrrado Moscoso	2–0	Francisco Troncoso	15–5, 15–9
Conrrado Moscoso / Roland Keller	2–0	Francisco Troncoso / Rodrigo Salgado	15–4, 15–12
Carlos Keller	Rodrigo Salgado	not played

2 June 2018	Ecuador	0–2	Colombia

José Ugalde	0–2	Sebastian Franco	4–15, 7–15
José Ugalde / Juan Cueva	0–2	Sebastian Franco / Mario Mercado	11–15, 2–15
Christian Chávez	Mario Mercado	not played

Final

3 June 2018	Bolivia	2–0	Colombia

Carlos Keller	2–1	Mario Mercado	15–10, 10–15, 11–8
Conrrado Moscoso / Roland Keller	2–1	Sebastian Franco / Mario Mercado	13–15, 15–13, 11–6
Conrrado Moscoso	Sebastian Franco	not played

== Women’s singles ==
=== Preliminary round ===
Pool A

Players	Pld	W	L	GW	GL	PW	PL	Points
(Argentina) María José Vargas	2	2	0	4	0	60	21	4
(Colombia) Cristina Amaya	2	1	1	2	2	48	41	3
(Ecuador) Ana Lucia Sarmiento	2	0	2	0	4	14	60	2

Pool B

Players	Pld	W	L	GW	GL	PW	PL	Points
(Bolivia) Yasmine Sabja	2	2	0	4	0	60	22	4
(Colombia) Carolina Gomez	2	1	1	2	2	48	57	3
(Ecuador) Maria Jose Muñoz	2	0	2	0	4	31	60	2

Pool C

Players	Pld	W	L	GW	GL	PW	PL	Points
(Argentina) Natalia Méndez	2	2	0	4	3	60	37	4
(Chile) Carla Muñoz	2	1	1	3	2	60	54	3
(Bolivia) Valeria Centellas	2	0	2	0	4	31	60	2

=== Medal round ===
First Round
9	(Bolivia) Valeria Centellas	15	15
8	(Ecuador) Maria Jose Muñoz	12	4

Quarterfinals
1	(Argentina) María José Vargas	15	15
9	(Bolivia) Valeria Centellas	10	9
5	(Colombia) Carolina Gomez	5	1
4	(Chile) Carla Muñoz	15	15
3	(Argentina) Natalia Méndez	4	4
6	(Colombia) Cristina Amaya	15	15
7	(Ecuador) Ana Lucia Sarmiento	2	2
2	(Bolivia) Yasmine Sabja	15	15

Semi-finals
1	(Argentina) María José Vargas	15	13	11
4	(Chile) Carla Muñoz	5	15	5
6	(Colombia) Cristina Amaya	8	10
2	(Bolivia) Yasmine Sabja	15	15

Final
1	(Argentina) María José Vargas	15	15
2	(Bolivia) Yasmine Sabja	4	6

== Women’s doubles ==
=== Preliminary round ===
Players	Pld	W	L	GW	GL	PW	PL	Points
(Argentina) Natalia Méndez / María José Vargas	3	3	0	6	0	90	30	6
(Bolivia) Jenny Daza / Stefanny Barrios	3	2	1	4	2	66	55	5
(Colombia) Cristina Amaya / Carolina Gómez	3	1	2	2	4	59	78	4
(Ecuador) Maria Jose Muñoz / Ana Sarmiento	3	0	3	0	6	38	90	3

=== Medal round ===
Semifinals
1	(Argentina) Natalia Méndez (Argentina) María José Vargas	15	15
4	(Ecuador) Maria Jose Muñoz (Ecuador) Ana Sarmiento	5	4
3	(Colombia) Cristina Amaya (Colombia) Carolina Gómez	5	13
2	(Bolivia) Jenny Daza (Bolivia) Stefanny Barrios	15	15

Final
1	(Argentina) Natalia Méndez (Argentina) María José Vargas	15	15
2	(Bolivia) Jenny Daza (Bolivia) Stefanny Barrios	11	10

== Women's team ==
Semifinals
2 June
Argentina	2
Ecuador	0
2 June
Colombia	0
Bolivia	2

Final
3 June
Argentina	2
Bolivia	0

Semifinals

2 June 2018	Argentina	2–0	Ecuador

María José Vargas	2–0	Maria Jose Muñoz	15–4, 15–8
María José Vargas / Natalia Méndez	2–0	Maria Jose Muñoz / Ana Sarmiento	15–3, 15–0
Natalia Méndez	Ana Sarmiento	not played

2 June 2018	Colombia	0–2	Bolivia

Cristina Amaya	0–2	Yasmine Sabja	12–15, 9–15
Cristina Amaya / Carolina Gómez	Jenny Daza / Stefanny Barrios	walkover
Carolina Gómez	Valeria Centellas	not played

Final

3 June 2018	Argentina	2–0	Bolivia

Natalia Méndez	2–1	Valeria Centellas	15–8, 12–15, 11–4
María José Vargas / Natalia Méndez	2–1	Jenny Daza / Stefanny Barrios	13–15,15–12, 11–4
María José Vargas	Yasmine Sabja	not played
