= 2021 Racquetball World Championships – Men's doubles =

- XIX Racquetball World Championships: Costa Rica 2018 -
Host	San José, Costa Rica
Dates	August 10–18
- Men's singles
- Women's singles
- Men's doubles
Gold	(Mexico) Javier Mar & Rodrigo Montoya
Silver	(Bolivia) Roland Keller & Conrrado Moscoso
Bronze	(United States) Charlie Pratt & Alejandro Landa (Colombia) Andrés Gómez & Mario Mercado
- Women's doubles

The International Racquetball Federation's 20th Racquetball World Championships were held in Guatemala City, Guatemala from November 26 to December 6. This was the first time that Worlds was held in Guatemala, and the second consecutive time a Central American country hosted the event, after Costa Rica in 2018.

For the third straight Worlds, Mexico won gold, and this year it was Javier Mar and Rodrigo Montoya winning for their first time and the seventh overall for Mexico. It was Montoya's second world title, as he won men's singles in 2018. He joined American Todd O'Neill and Mexican Álvaro Beltrán as the only men to win both singles and doubles at the World Championships. Mar and Montoya beat Bolivians Roland Keller and Conrrado Moscoso in the final, which was the first time Bolivia had reached the finals.

== Tournament format ==
The 2021 World Championships used a two-stage format with an initial group stage that was a round robin, with the results used to seed players for a medal round.

== Group stage ==
=== Pool A ===
Players	Pld	W	L	GF	GA	PF	PA	Points
(Mexico) Javier Mar & Rodrigo Montoya	2	2	0	4	0	60	22	4
(Costa Rica) Gabriel Garro & Felipe Segreda	2	1	1	2	3	47	60	3
(Guatemala) Edwin Galicia & Christian Wer	2	0	2	1	4	43	68	2

=== Pool B ===
Players	Pld	W	L	GF	GA	PF	PA	Points
(Argentina) Diego Garcia & Shai Manzuri	2	2	0	4	0	6o	36	4
(Colombia) Andrés Gómez & Mario Mercado	2	1	1	2	2	55	41	3
(Chile) Lee Gunhee & Kim Mingyu	2	0	2	0	4	22	60	2

=== Pool C ===
Players	Pld	W	L	GF	GA	PF	PA	Points
(United States) Charlie Pratt & Alejandro Landa	2	2	0	4	1	70	35	4
(Ecuador) Juan Francisco Cueva & Jose Daniel Ugalde	2	1	1	3	2	60	42	3
(Republic of Ireland) Ken Cottrell & Eoin Tynan	2	0	2	0	4	7	60	2

=== Pool D ===
Players	Pld	W	L	GF	GA	PF	PA	Points
(Canada) Coby Iwaasa & Samuel Murray	2	2	0	4	1	65	44	4
(Bolivia) Roland Keller & Conrrado Moscoso	2	1	1	3	2	67	52	3
(Chile) Rafael Gatica & Rodrigo Salgado	2	0	2	0	4	24	60	2

== Medal round ==
Round of 16
1	(Mexico) Javier Mar & Rodrigo Montoya
BYE
9	(Republic of Ireland) Ken Cottrell & Eoin Tynan	3, 3
8	(Costa Rica) Gabriel Garro & Felipe Segreda	15, 15
5	(Ecuador) Juan Francisco Cueva & Jose Daniel Ugalde	15, 15
12	(Guatemala) Edwin Galicia & Christian Wer	14, 14
13
4	(United States) Charlie Pratt & Alejandro Landa	15, 15
3	(Canada) Coby Iwaasa & Samuel Murray
BYE
11	(South Korea) Lee Gunhee & Kim Mingyu	11, 4
6	(Bolivia) Roland Keller & Conrrado Moscoso	15, 15
7	(Colombia) Andrés Gómez & Mario Mercado	15, 15
10	(Chile) Rafael Gatica & Rodrigo Salgado	5, 10
15
2	(Argentina) Diego Garcia & Shai Manzuri

Quarter finals
1	Mexico	15, 15
8	Costa Rica	5, 5
5	Ecuador	5, 5
4	(United States) USA	15, 15
3	Canada	15, 12, 4
6	Bolivia	9, 15, 11
7	Colombia	15, 11, 11
2	Argentina	12, 15, 8

Semi finals
1	Mexico	15, 15
4	USA	2, 13
6	Bolivia	15, 15
7	Colombia	1, 5

Finals
1	Mexico	15, 15
6	Bolivia	10, 9

Winners
(Mexico) Javier Mar & Rodrigo Montoya
