= Racquetball at the 2013 Bolivarian Games =

- Dates: 18–24 November 2013
- Nations: 8

Racquetball (Spanish: Racquetbol), for the 2013 Bolivarian Games, took place from 18 November to 24 November 2013.

== Medal table ==
Rank	Nation	Gold	Silver	Bronze	Total
1	Ecuador (ECU)	5	3	1	9
2	Bolivia (BOL)	1	2	3	6
3	Venezuela (VEN)	1	0	2	3
4	Colombia (COL)	0	2	3	5
5	Chile (CHI)	0	0	3	3
6	Dominican Republic (DOM)	0	0	1	1
Totals (6 entries)		7	7	13	27

== Medalists ==
Event	Gold	Silver	Bronze
Men's singles	Carlos Keller Vargas (BOL)	Fernando Jose Rios Samaniego (ECU)	Jose Daniel Ugalde Albornoz (ECU)
Men's singles	Carlos Keller Vargas (BOL)	Fernando Jose Rios Samaniego (ECU)	Luis Pérez (DOM)
Men's doubles	Venezuela; Cesar Castro; Cesar Castillo	Ecuador; Fernando Jose Rios Samaniego; Jose Daniel Alvarez Coello	Colombia; Sebastian Franco Franco; Alejandro Herrera Azcarate
Men's doubles	Venezuela; Cesar Castro; Cesar Castillo	Ecuador; Fernando Jose Rios Samaniego; Jose Daniel Alvarez Coello	Bolivia; Ernesto Ruiz Michell; Diego Esteban Crespo Daza
Men's team	Ecuador; Jose Daniel Alvarez Coello; Fernando Jose Rios Samaniego; Jose Daniel Ugalde Albornoz	Bolivia; Diego Esteban Crespo Daza; Carlos Keller Vargas; Felipe Mercado Sandi; Ernesto Ruiz Michell	Venezuela; Cesar Castillo; Cesar Castro; Ezequiel Paez; Roberto Santander
Women's singles	Maria Veronica Sotomayor Malo (ECU)	Maria Paz Muñoz Albornoz (ECU)	Cristina Amaya Cassino (COL)
Women's singles	Maria Veronica Sotomayor Malo (ECU)	Maria Paz Muñoz Albornoz (ECU)	Angela Grisar Martinez (CHI)
Women's doubles	Ecuador; Maria Paz Muñoz Albornoz; Maria Veronica Sotomayor Malo	Colombia; Cristina Amaya Cassino; Maria Carolina Gomez Reyes	Bolivia; Cintia Carola Loma Torrico; Jenny Romaneth Daza Navia
Women's doubles	Ecuador; Maria Paz Muñoz Albornoz; Maria Veronica Sotomayor Malo	Colombia; Cristina Amaya Cassino; Maria Carolina Gomez Reyes	Chile; Angela Grisar; Carla Paola Munoz Montesinos
Women's team	Ecuador; Maria Paz Muñoz Albornoz; Maria Veronica Sotomayor Malo	Colombia; Cristina Amaya Cassino; Maria Carolina Gomez Reyes	Bolivia; Jenny Romaneth Daza Navia; Cintia Carola Loma Torrico; Natalia Mendez; Adriana Selagch Riveros Gonzales
Women's team	Ecuador; Maria Paz Muñoz Albornoz; Maria Veronica Sotomayor Malo	Colombia; Cristina Amaya Cassino; Maria Carolina Gomez Reyes	Chile; Angela Grisar; Carla Paola Munoz Montesinos
Combined team	Ecuador; Jose Daniel Alvarez Coello; Maria Paz Muñoz Albornoz; Fernando Jose Rios Samaniego; Maria Veronica Sotomayor Malo; Jose Daniel Ugalde Albornoz	Bolivia; Diego Esteban Crespo Daza; Jenny Romaneth Daza Navia; Carlos Keller Vargas; Cintia Carola Loma Torrico; Natalia Mendez; Felipe Mercado Sandi; Adriana Selagch Riveros Gonzales; Ernesto Ruiz Michell	Venezuela; Cesar Castillo; Cesar Castro; Paola Guerra; Ezequiel Paez; Roberto Santander; Mariana Tobon
Combined team	Ecuador; Jose Daniel Alvarez Coello; Maria Paz Muñoz Albornoz; Fernando Jose Rios Samaniego; Maria Veronica Sotomayor Malo; Jose Daniel Ugalde Albornoz	Bolivia; Diego Esteban Crespo Daza; Jenny Romaneth Daza Navia; Carlos Keller Vargas; Cintia Carola Loma Torrico; Natalia Mendez; Felipe Mercado Sandi; Adriana Selagch Riveros Gonzales; Ernesto Ruiz Michell	Colombia; Cristina Amaya Cassino; Sebastian Franco Franco; Maria Carolina Gomez Reyes; Francisco Javier Gomez Reyes; Alejandro Herrera Azcarate
