= Alejandro Landa =

Mexican racquetball player

Personal information
- Born: March 28, 1988 (age 38) Chihuahua, Mexico

Sport
- Sport: Racquetball

Achievements and titles
- Highest world ranking: 2nd (2019–20, 2021)
Medal record
Men's Racquetball
Representing Mexico
World Championships
| Bronze medal – third place | 2010 Korea | Doubles |
Pan Am Championships
| Gold medal – first place | 2017 San Jose | Singles |
| Gold medal – first place | 2017 San Jose | Doubles |
| Gold medal – first place | 2016 San Luis Potosí | Doubles |
| Silver medal – second place | 2010 San Pedro Sula | Doubles |
Representing United States
Pan American Games
| Bronze medal – third place | 2023 Santiago | Team |
World Championships
| Gold medal – first place | 2021 Guatemala City | Singles |
| Bronze medal – third place | 2021 Guatemala City | Doubles |
Pan Am Championships
| Bronze medal – third place | 2022 Santa Cruz | Singles |
| Bronze medal – third place | 2022 Santa Cruz | Mixed doubles |
| Bronze medal – third place | 2022 Santa Cruz | Team |

Alejandro Landa (born March 20, 1988) is a Mexican-born American retired racquetball player. Landa is a former World Champion in Men's Singles, winning the title in Guatemala City in December 2021 while playing for the USA. Previously, he'd represented Mexico internationally, winning gold in Men's Singles and Doubles at the 2017 Pan American Championships. Landa also won four titles on the International Racquetball Tour (IRT).

== Early life ==
Landa was born in Chihuahua, Mexico, but moved to the US as a teenager. He began playing racquetball at age 12. His best result as a junior player was a 2nd-place finish in Boy's U18 at the 2006 Junior World Championships, losing in the final to David Ortega of Mexico.

== 2008 - 2012 ==
Landa played on the International Racquetball Tour (IRT) 1-2 times a season, until the 2008–09 season, when he entered five events. In those events, Landa finished in the Round of 16 three times and twice in the Round of 32, which led him to finish ranked 20th that season.

He played five events in the 2009–10 season (four Round of 16 finishes, one Round of 32), and seven events in the 2010–11 season (six Round of 16 finishes, one Round of 32). Landa was ranked 15th in 2009–10 and 17th in 2010–11.

In 2010, Landa represented Mexico for the first time, and did so twice. He played Men's Doubles with Ruben Estrada at the 2010 Pan American Championships in San Pedro Sula, Honduras. They lost in the final to Canadians Mike Green and Tim Landeryou, 15–9, 12–15, 11–9.

That summer Landa played both Men's Singles and Men's Doubles at the 2010 World Championships in Seoul, South Korea. In Men's Singles, he lost in the quarterfinals to Bolivian Ricardo Monroy, 14–15, 15–9, 11–10, while in Men's Doubles – playing with Miguel Perea – he earned a bronze medal by reaching the semi-finals, where they lost to Canadians Green and Landeryou, 15–2, 15–5.

In the IRT 2011–12 season, Landa made his first IRT quarterfinal at the 2012 San Diego Open by getting a forfeit win over Kane Waselenchuk. He lost to Tony Carson in that quarterfinal, 5–11, 11–4, 11–8, 12–10. Overall that season, he played in six events with four Round of 16 finishes and one Round of 32 along with that quarterfinal, which ranked him 15th at end of the season.

== 2013 to 2016 ==
2013 was a breakthrough year for Landa. In January, he reached his first IRT semi-final at the California Open by defeating Jose Rojas in the Round of 16 and Daniel de la Rosa in the quarterfinals, but he lost to Kane Waselenchuk in the semis, 11–2, 11–8, 7–11, 11–3. Also in early 2013, Landa reached the quarterfinals twice in New York and St Louis, and he finished 15th at the end of the 2012–13 IRT season.

Also in 2013, Landa played four events on the World Racquetball Tour, reaching the finals each time and winning three of them. He beat Alejandro Cardona at the San Diego Open, Polo Gutierrez at the Juarez Open and Gutierrez again at the Chile Open, 5–15, 15–12, 11–9. At the end of the year, Cardona beat Landa, 15–8, 9–15, 11–7, in Chula Vista, California.

Despite a good 2013, Landa played less in the next year. He was only in three events in the 2013–14 IRT season, and didn't make it past the Round of 16 at all. Landa also played three events on the WRT in 2014, and won two of them. Both wins came in Juarez, Mexico. He defeated Javier Moreno in April and then beat Jake Bredenbeck in August, 15–10, 15–10.

Landa reached the semi-finals at the US Open for the first time in 2014, as he beat Jose Rojas in the Round of 16, 3–11, 11–9, 14–12, 6–11, 11–4 and Daniel de la Rosa in the quarterfinals, 11–2, 11–8, 11–6, before losing to Kane Waselenchuk in the semis, 11–4, 11–2, 11–2. That was one of two semi-finals he reached in the 2014–15 IRT season. The other was in San Marcos, Texas, where he defeated Álvaro Beltrán in the Round of 16, 4–11, 11–9, 11–6, 11–7, Chris Crowther in the quarterfinals, 11–7, 11–8, 5–11, 3–11, 14–12, before losing to Rocky Carson, 11–2, 13–11, 11–6. This helped Landa finish 11th in the rankings, which was a career high.

Landa won both of the WRT events he played in 2015. He made an impressive run to win again in Juarez, as he defeated Carlos Keller Vargas in the Round of 32, Javier Moreno in the Round of 16, David Horn in the quarterfinals, Sebastian Franco in the semi-finals, and Bredenbeck in the final, 15–5, 15–4. Then at the end of the year, Landa beat Jaime Martell in the final of the Alamo City Open in San Antonio, beating Bredenbeck in the quarterfinals and David Horn in the semi-finals to reach the final.

In 2016, Landa successfully defended his Alamo City Open title by beating Cardona in the final, 15–6, 15–10. He defeated Andree Parrilla, 15–12, 15–11, in the quarterfinals, and Jaime Martell, 15–11, 15–13, in the semi-finals en route to the final.

Landa played for Mexico for a third time at the 2016 Pan American Championships in San Luis Potosí, Mexico, winning gold in Men's Doubles with Javier Moreno. They defeated the Fernando Rios and Jose Daniel Ugalde of Ecuador, 15–11, 15–10, in the final.

== 2017 to 2019 ==
After only playing one IRT event in 2015–16 (a Round of 32 loss to Javier Moreno at the 2015 US Open), Landa stormed back to the tour in 2016–17, as he reached the semi-finals in three of the five events he played. Landa was a semi-finalist in the first event of that season in Overland Park, Kansas, as he beat Jose Rojas in the Round of 16 and Jake Bredenbeck in the quarterfinals before losing to Kane Waselenchuk in the semis, 11–3, 11–4, 11–2. His second semi-final came in Lilburn, Georgia, where Landa beat Rocky Carson, 11–5, 10–12, 11–0, 5–11, 13–11, in the Round of 16, and Jansen Allen, 11–9, 11–7, 11–9, in the quarterfinals before losing to Daniel de la Rosa in the semis, 11–7, 12–10, 1–11, 9–11, 11–6. The third semi-final was in Sioux Falls, South Dakota, where De La Rosa again got the better of him in the semis, 11–5, 12–10, 11–7. Landa beat Rojas in the Round of 16 and Andree Parrilla in the quarters in Sioux Falls. Overall, Landa finished ranked 10th, which was a career high.

Landa played for Mexico for a fourth time at the 2017 Pan American Championships in San José, Costa Rica, winning gold in both Men's Singles and Men's Doubles with Polo Gutierrez. In Men's Singles, he defeated Canadian Mike Green in the quarterfinals, 15–12, 15–5, Costa Rican Andres Acuña in the semi-finals, 15–14, 15–10, and the USA's Charles Pratt in the final, 15–10, 15–11. In Men's Doubles, Landa and Gutierrez beat Ecuadorans Rios and Ugalde in the quarterfinals, 15–3, 9–15, 11–3, then the Dominican Republic's Ramon De Leon and Luis Perez, 15–3, 15–3, in the semi-finals, and in the final they defeated Jake Bredenbeck and David Horn of the US, 10–15, 15–8, 11–4.

In the 2017 WRT season, Landa played four events, getting to three finals and winning once. In January, Alejandro Cardona beat Landa, 15–10, 15–10, in the final of the WRT 2018 West Coast Championship. Then on back to back weeks in June, Landa defeated Jake Bredenbeck to win the Torneo Internacional Canels in San Luis Potosí, Mexico, by defeating Cardona in the semi-finals and Jake Bredenbeck in the final, 15–6, 14–15, 11–0, and then was a finalist at the Paola Longoria Challenge in Chihuahua, Mexico, losing to Rodrigo Montoya in the final, 15–13, 5–15, 11–2, after getting by Cardona in the semi-finals, 12–15, 15–14, 11–7.

Landa tied his best ever finish at the US Open in 2017, as he reached the semi-finals, losing to Rocky Carson, 11–3, 11–4, 7–11, 11–6. He beat Daniel de la Rosa, 11–9, 12–10, 7–11, 6–11, 11–4, in the quarterfinals to get to the semis. Landa also reached the semi-finals in Atlanta, as he beat Álvaro Beltrán in the quarterfinals, but lost to Kane Waselenchuk in the semis.

Then Landa went one better, as he not only reached an IRT final for the first time at the 2018 Lewis Drug Pro-Am in Sioux Falls, South Dakota, but he won the final by defeating Daniel de la Rosa, 15–6, 7–15, 11–10, in the final. En route to the final, Landa beat Tim Landeryou, 15–5, 3–15, 11–6, in the Round of 16, Rocky Carson in the quarterfinals, 15–14, 11–15, 11–4, and Samuel Murray, 15–11, 15–7, in the semi-finals.

In the next IRT tournament – the 2018 IRT March Madness event in San Antonio, Landa again reached the final, but he lost to Sebastian Franco, 15–9 15–13. But Landa picked up his 2nd IRT title in April 2018, as he won in Cincinnati, defeating Álvaro Beltrán in the final, 11–15, 15–7, 11–8, after beating Rocky Carson in the semi-finals, 8–15, 15–6, 11–5.

Landa was the Mexican national champion in 2019, yet he was not selected to represent Mexico at the 2019 Pan American Games. That omission led him to change allegiances to the USA for future international events.

== 2020 to retirement - Playing for the USA ==
Thus, he competed in the 2020 USA Racquetball National Doubles Championships in Tempe, Arizona, where he won the title with Sudsy Monchik, as they defeated Jake Bredenbeck and Jose Diaz in the final, 15-13, 4-15, 11-9. That qualified Landa to represent the USA at the 2020 IRF World Championships. However, the COVID-19 pandemic delayed Worlds until 2021.

In the 2021 USA team qualifying event in Des Moines, Iowa, Landa finished second to Rocky Carson, losing in the final, 15-12, 15-13, after defeating Jake Bredenbeck in the semi-finals, 15-3, 15-11. Carson chose not to go to the 2021 World Championships in Guatemala City, Guatemala, so Landa was the USA's #1 singles player with Bredenbeck #2.

That worked out well for Landa, as he won Men's Singles at 2021 World Championships, defeating Bolivian Conrrado Moscoso in the semi-finals, 3-15, 15-8, 11-6, and Costa Rican Andrés Acuña in the final, 15-6, 15-6. Landa became the 8th USA man to win Men's Singles at Worlds, and the 3rd Mexican born man to win (after Alvaro Beltran and Rodrigo Montoya).

Landa was runner up at the 2022 USA Racquetball National Singles and Doubles Championships in College Station, Texas to Rocky Carson, losing in the final, 11-9, 9-11, 11-4, 11-7, but qualifying for Team USA for the 2022 World Championships. He also played doubles with Sudsy Monchik, and they lost in the semi-finals to brothers Jake and Sam Bredenbeck, 8-11, 7-11, 11-3, 15-13, 13-11.

Landa was the defending Men's Singles World Champion going into the 2022 World Championships in San Luis Potosi, Mexico, but he lost in the quarterfinals to Bolivian Conrrado Moscoso, 15-11, 15-6, 15-12. But he helped the USA reach the semi-finals in the Men's Team event, so Landa did get a bronze medal in that event.

Landa teamed up with Daniel De La Rosa to win Men's Doubles at the 2023 USA Racquetball National Singles and Doubles Championships in Tempe, Arizona, where they beat Wayne Antone and Adam Manilla in final, 15-13, 11-5, 11-8, and reached the final by beating Jake Bredenbeck and Sam Bredenbeck, 12-10, 6-11, 11-7, 10-12, 11-2, in the semi-finals., which qualified them for the 2023 Pan American Games. He also played Mixed Doubles with Michelle De La Rosa, and they lost in the semi-finals to Daniel De La Rosa and Hollie Scott, 14-12, 11-3, 11-9.

At the 2023 Pan American Games, Landa and De La Rosa lost in the quarterfinals of Men's Doubles to Canadians Coby Iwaasa and Samuel Murray, 4-11, 8-11, 11-8, 11-8, 11-4. But he earned a bronze medal in the Men's Team event, as the USA lost in the semi-finals to Bolivia.

Landa announced that he would retire at the end of 2023, as injuries have hampered his training and he's going to devote more time to his family and other personal interests.

== See also ==
- List of racquetball players
