= Rodrigo Montoya =

Mexican racquetball player (born 1996)

Personal information
- Born: June 4, 1996 (age 30) Chihuahua, Mexico

Sport
- Sport: Racquetball
Medal record
Men's Racquetball
Representing Mexico
Pan American Games
Gold medal – first place	2023 Santiago	Doubles
Bronze medal – third place	2023 Santiago	Singles
Bronze medal – third place	2023 Santiago	Team
Gold medal – first place	2019 Lima	Singles
Gold medal – first place	2019 Lima	Doubles
Bronze medal – third place	2019 Lima	Team
World Championships
Gold medal – first place	2022 San Luis Potosí	Mixed
Gold medal – first place	2022 San Luis Potosí	Team
Bronze medal – third place	2022 San Luis Potosí	Singles
Gold medal – first place	2021 Guatemala City	Doubles
Gold medal – first place	2018 San José	Singles
Central American and Caribbean Games
Gold medal – first place	2026 Santo Domingo	Singles
Silver medal – second place	2026 Santo Domingo	Mixed Doubles
Gold medal – first place	2026 Santo Domingo	Team
Silver medal – second place	2023 Santo Domingo	Singles
Gold medal – first place	2023 Santo Domingo	Doubles
Gold medal – first place	2023 Santo Domingo	Team
Gold medal – first place	2018 Barranquilla	Team
Pan American Championships
Gold medal – first place	2026 Guatemala City	Doubles
Gold medal – first place	2026 Guatemala City	Team
Bronze medal – third place	2025 Guatemala City	Mixed Doubles
Bronze medal – third place	2025 Guatemala City	Team
Gold medal – first place	2024 Guatemala City	Singles
Gold medal – first place	2024 Guatemala City	Team
Bronze medal – third place	2024 Guatemala City	Doubles
Gold medal – first place	2023 Guatemala City	Doubles
Silver medal – second place	2023 Guatemala City	Mixed Doubles
Gold medal – first place	2022 Santa Cruz	Mixed Doubles
Silver medal – second place	2022 Santa Cruz	Team
Bronze medal – third place	2022 Santa Cruz	Singles
Bronze medal – third place	2019 Barranquilla	Doubles
Bronze medal – third place	2018 Temuco	Singles
Gold medal – first place	2018 Temuco	Doubles
The World Games
Silver medal – second place	2022 Birmingham	Singles

Rodrigo Montoya (born June 4, 1996) is a Mexican racquetball player. He is the current Central American and Caribbean Games Men's Singles champion, winning the title in 2026, as well as the current Pan American Games champion in Men's Doubles, and the 2026 Pan American Champion in Men's Singles. He's a former International Racquetball Federation (IRF) World Champion in Men's Singles, Men's Doubles and Mixed Doubles, and was the first player to win all three of those titles at Worlds.

== Junior years – Success at World Juniors ==
Montoya played at the 2013 International Racquetball Federation (IRF) World Junior Championships in Sucre, Bolivia, where he was second in Boys U16, losing the final to fellow Mexican Andree Parrilla, 15–9, 15–11. He also played U16 Doubles there, and won it with Erik Garcia.

Montoya won Boys U18 at World Juniors in 2015 in Santo Domingo, Dominican Republic, by defeating Parrilla in the final, 15–7, 15–11.

== Career begins – 2015–2018 ==
Montoya began playing pro racquetball on the World Racquetball Tour (WRT) in 2015. After not getting past the quarterfinals in his first three appearances, Montoya had a breakthrough when he won the 2016 Pleasanton Open, defeating Alejandro Cardona in the final, 6–15, 15–5, 11–1. He also played the US Open for the first time, losing to Kane Waselenchuk the Round of 32, 11–2, 11–5, 11–6.

In 2017, Montoya played 10 WRT tournaments, reaching the final six times and winning thrice. His first final's win was in January at the 2017 Longhorn Open, defeating Javier Mar, 12–15, 15–8, 11–2. He followed that up with a win in February at the Mount Rainier Open, beating David Horn, 15–5, 15–5. His third win came in June, when he defeated Alejandro Landa in the Paola Longoria Challenge, 15–13, 5–15, 11–2.

Montoya played twice on the International Racquetball Tour (IRT) in 2017, and reached the semi-finals in Canoga Park, California, where he beat Álvaro Beltrán, 11–8, 12–10, 11–5, in the quarterfinals before losing to Kane Waselenchuk in the semis, 11–1, 11–0, 11–3. In his second US Open, Montoya again reached the Round of 32, and lost to Alejandro Landa but in a tie-breaker, 11–6, 6–11, 11–8, 9–11, 11–9.

== Winning gold for Mexico – 2018–present ==
Montoya began 2018 with a runner up showing at the 2018 WRT Longhorn Open, losing in the final to Jake Bredenbeck, 15–3, 15–11. Then at the 2018 IRT Lewis Drug Pro-Am, he lost to Samuel Murray in the quarterfinals, 15–10, 5–15, 11–5.

Montoya first played for Mexico at the 2018 Pan American Racquetball Championships in Temuco, Chile, where he played both Men's Singles and Doubles. In singles, he reached the semi-finals before losing to eventual champion Carlos Keller of Bolivia, 15–6, 2–15, 11–4. But he and Álvaro Beltrán won Men's Doubles, defeating Bolivia's Roland Keller and Conrrado Moscoso in the final, 13–15, 15–10, 11–6.

Also in 2018, Montoya played at the 2018 Central American and Caribbean Games in Barranquilla, Colombia, where he lost in the quarterfinals of Men's Singles to Luis Perez of the Dominican Republic, 15–10, 15–11. But he helped Mexico win gold in the Men's Team event, including beating Andres Acuña of Costa Rica, 15–10, 15–2, in one of the singles matches in the final.

Montoya wrapped up an internationally successful 2018 by winning Men's Singles at the IRF World Championships, beating USA's Charlie Pratt in the final, 15–14, 15–9, after defeating USA's David Horn in the semi-finals, 15–9, 15–8, and Bolivia's Conrrado Moscoso in the quarterfinals, 13–15, 15–7, 11–6. It was Montoya's first World title in his first World Championships appearance.

At the 2018 US Open, he had his career best finish, losing to Mario Mercado in the Round of 16, 6–15, 15–13, 11–5.

Montoya began 2019 with a Round of 16 finish at the IRT's California Open in January, when he lost to Alejandro Landa, 10–15, 15–7, 11–6. But two weeks later, he defeated Landa en route to a semi-final finish in the 41st Annual Lewis Drug IRT Pro-Am in Sioux Falls, South Dakota. There Montoya beat Landa in the Round of 16, 15–8, 9–15, 11–10, Álvaro Beltrán in the quarterfinals, 15–12, 15–6, before losing to Daniel de la Rosa in the semi-finals, 15–1, 15–4. He followed that up with another semi-final finish at the Shamrock Shootout in Lombard, Illinois, where Montoya beat De La Rosa in the 16s, 15–3, 15–9, and Beltran in the quarters, 15–8, 15–9, before losing to Rocky Carson in the semis, 15–11, 15–2. Those results helped Montoya finish the 2018–19 IRT season in the top 10 for the first time at #9.

Montoya tried to defend Mexico's Pan American Men's Doubles Championship at the 2019 Pan American Racquetball Championships in Barranquilla, Colombia, with Javier Mar, but they lost in the semi-finals to Bolivia's Roland Keller and Conrrado Moscoso, 14–15, 15–11, 11–7.

At the 2019 Pan American Games in Lima, Peru, Montoya won both Men's Singles and Men's Doubles. In singles, he defeated fellow Mexican Álvaro Beltrán in the final, 9–15, 15–6, 11–0. In the semi-finals, Montoya defeated Bolivia's Conrrado Moscoso, 15–14, 15–10, and in the quarters, beat Canada's Samuel Murray, 15–7, 15–10. In doubles, he and Javier Mar beat Moscoso and Roland Keller, 15–10, 15–1. They defeated USA's Rocky Carson and Charlie Pratt in the semi-finals, 11–15, 15–9, 11–8, and Canada's Coby Iwaasa and Samuel Murray in the quarterfinals, 15–5, 15–6. Despite those two wins, Montoya and his team-mates only reached the semi-finals in the team event in Lima, where they lost to Colombia's Sebastian Franco and Mario Mercado.

Montoya went to the 2021 IRF World Championships in Guatemala City, Guatemala as the defending champion in Men's Singles. However, he was defeated by Costa Rican Andrés Acuña in the group stage, 15–5, 15–4, which gave him a low seeding for the medal round. He lost his second medal round match to American Jake Bredenbeck, 15–10, 15–14. Montoya also played Men's Doubles in Guatemala with Javier Mar, and they won gold by defeating Bolivia's Roland Keller and Conrrado Moscoso, 15–10, 15–9, in the final after beating the USA's Alejandro Landa and Charlie Pratt, 15–2, 15–13, in the semi-finals. So, although Montoya failed to defend his title in Men's Singles, he won Men's Doubles, and in doing so became just the third man to win both singles and doubles at Worlds (after USA's Todd O'Neill and Mexico's Álvaro Beltrán).

Montoya and Samantha Salas won the first Mixed Doubles Pan American Championship at the 2022 Pan American Racquetball Championships in Santa Cruz de la Sierra, Bolivia. He also was bronze medalist in Men's Singles, and silver medalist in the Men's Team event in Bolivia.

Playing at the 2024 Pan American Racquetball Championships in Guatemala City, Montoya won three medals: two gold and a bronze. He won Men's Singles by defeating Canadian Samuel Murray in the final, and won the Men's Team event with Sebastian Hernandez by defeating the USA in the final. But he and Hernandez lost in the semi-finals of Men's Doubles to Costa Ricans Andrés Acuña and Gabriel Garcia.

Going into the 2025 Pan American Racquetball Championships in Guatemala City, Montoya had injured his pectoral muscle, but was cleared to play, although he was only in Mixed Doubles with Samantha Salas, as well as the Men's Team event. In the mixed doubles, they defeated Frédérique Lambert and Samuel Murray, 11-7, 11-7, 11-4, in the quarterfinals, but lost to Carla Muñoz and Alan Natera, 11-7, 11-7, 3-11, 11-6, in semi-finals. He also reached the semi-finals in the Men's Team division, losing to Bolivia.

Montoya won gold in Men's Singles at the 2026 Central American and Caribbean Games in Santo Domingo, Dominican Republic. He defeated team-mate Eduardo Portillo in the final, 11-4, 11-4, 11-6, after beating Costa Rican Andrés Acuña in the semi-finals, 9-11, 11-9, 11-6, 11-8. He was also part of the Mexico team that won the Men's Team event, defeating Costa Rica in the final helped by Montoya's win over Gabriel Garcia, 11-6, 12-10, 11-7. Montoya also competed in Mixed Doubles with Jessica Parrilla, and they reached the final by defeating Guatemalans Christian Aldana and Maria Renee Rodriguez, 9-11, 14-12, 11-9, 9-11, 11-8, but lost the final to Acuña and Larissa Faeth of Costa Rica, 6-11, 11-7, 11-4, 11-9. Thus, Montoya came away from Santo Domingo with three medals: two gold and one silver.

== Career summary ==
Montoya has played many times for Mexico, winning over 30 medals including 19 gold medals.

=== Career record ===
This table lists Montoya's results across annual events.

Event	2015	2016	2017	2018	2019	2020	2021	2022	2023	2024	2025-26
US Open	-	32	32	16	32	P	32		-	-	-
IRT Ranking	-	-	63	22	9	12	17	11	4	2	5
World Racquetball Tour Ranking	23	6	2	8	-	-	-	-	-	-	

Note: W = winner, F = finalist, SF = semi-finalist, QF = quarterfinalist, 16 = Round of 16. P = pandemic cancelled event.

== See also ==
- List of racquetball players
