= Cristina Amaya =

Colombian racquetball player

Personal information
- Full name: Cristina Amaya Cassino
- Born: 28 October 1988 (age 37) Cali, Colombia

Sport
- Country: Colombia
- Sport: Racquetball

Achievements and titles
- Highest world ranking: 5th
Medal record
Women's racquetball
Representing Colombia
World Championships
Bronze medal – third place	2018 San José	Doubles
World Games
Silver medal – second place	2013 Cali	Singles
Pan Am Championships
Silver medal – second place	2019 Barranquilla	Doubles
Bronze medal – third place	2015 Santo Domingo	Singles
Bronze medal – third place	2015 Santo Domingo	Doubles
Bronze medal – third place	2014 Santa Cruz	Singles
Central American and Caribbean Games
Bronze medal – third place	2014 Veracruz	Singles
Bronze medal – third place	2014 Veracruz	Doubles
Bronze medal – third place	2014 Veracruz	Team
Bronze medal – third place	2018 Barranquilla	Doubles
Silver medal – second place	2018 Barranquilla	Team
Bolivarian Games
Gold medal – first place	2017 Santa Marta	Singles
Bronze medal – third place	2017 Santa Marta	Team
Bronze medal – third place	2013 Trujillo	Singles
Silver medal – second place	2013 Trujillo	Doubles
Silver medal – second place	2013 Trujillo	Team
South American Games
Bronze medal – third place	2018 Cochabamba	Singles
Bronze medal – third place	2018 Cochabamba	Doubles
Bronze medal – third place	2018 Cochabamba	Team

Cristina Amaya Cassino (Note: In this Spanish name, the first or paternal surname is Amaya and the second or maternal family name is Cassino.) (born 28 October 1988) is a Colombian racquetball player. Amaya finished the 2017-18 Ladies Professional Racquetball Tour (LPRT) season as the 8th ranked player, which was her eighth consecutive season in the top 10 (first was the 2010–11 season). She was the third South American player to be in the women's pro top 10 after Angela Grisar and Veronica Sotomayor.

== Professional career ==
Amaya has been playing the women's pro tour since 2009. She has reached the finals twice. First, Amaya was in the final of the 2013 Abierto Mexicano de Racquetas tournament, where she lost to Paola Longoria, and most recently, she was a finalist in the 2017 New Jersey Open, when she again lost to Longoria. Amaya's career high ranking was 3rd in December 2013. She was named Most Improved LPRT player for 2013.

Amaya and Adriana Riveros were finalists in Ladies Professional Racquetball Tour Doubles at the 2017 US Open Racquetball Championships, losing to Paola Longoria and Gabriela Martinez, 15–5, 15–8.

== International career ==
In 2017, Amaya won Women's Singles at the 2017 Bolivarian Games in Santa Marta, Colombia, and her performance helped Colombia get bronze in the team event. Four years earlier, Amaya was a bronze medalist in Women's Singles, as well as silver medalist in Women's Doubles - with Carolina Gomez - and Women's Team at the 2013 Bolivarian Games in Trujillo, Peru.

Amaya plays for Colombia and was a silver medalist at the 2013 World Games, losing in a tie-breaker to Paola Longoria in the final.

She has earned three bronze medals at the Pan American Championships. Her first was in 2014 Pan Am Championships in Santa Cruz, Bolivia, where she lost in the semi-finals to Susana Acosta, 15–10, 14–15, 11–7. In 2015, Amaya was a semi-finalist in both Women's Singles, losing to Veronica Sotomayor of Ecuador, 15–3, 15–8, and Woman's Doubles with Vivian Gomez, losing to Mexicans Longoria and Samantha Salas, 15–6, 15–3.

== See also ==
- List of racquetball players
