= 2021 Racquetball World Championships =

- XX Racquetball World Championships: 2021 -
| Host | Guatemala City |
| Dates | November 29-December 6, 2021 |
- Men's singles
| Gold | (United States) Alejandro Landa |
| Silver | (Costa Rica) Andrés Acuña |
| Bronze | (Colombia) Mario Mercado (Bolivia) Conrrado Moscoso |
- Women's singles
| Gold | (Mexico) Paola Longoria |
| Silver | (United States) Kelani Lawrence |
| Bronze | (United States) Rhonda Rajsich (Argentina) Natalia Méndez |
- Men's doubles
| Gold | (Mexico) Javier Mar & Rodrigo Montoya |
| Silver | (Bolivia) Koko Keller & Conrrado Moscoso |
| Bronze | (United States) Charlie Pratt & Alejandro Landa (Colombia) Mario Mercado & Andrés Gómez |
- Women's doubles
| Gold | (Mexico) Paola Longoria & Samantha Salas |
| Silver | (United States) Rhonda Rajsich & Erika Manilla |
| Bronze | (Guatemala) María Renée Rodríguez & Gabriela Martínez (Argentina) Natalia Méndez & Valeria Centellas |

The International Racquetball Federation's 20th Racquetball World Championships was held in Guatemala City, Guatemala from November 29-December 6, 2021. The event was to be held in the summer of 2020, but the COVID-19 pandemic led to the postponement of the event.

The 2021 World Racquetball Championships were the racquetball qualifying event for the 2022 World Games.

The defending champions were Rodrigo Montoya of Mexico in men's singles, Gabriela Martínez of Guatemala in women's singles, Mexicans Álvaro Beltrán and Daniel de la Rosa in men's doubles, and Bolivians Valeria Centellas and Yasmine Sabja in women's doubles. Mexico swept the team standings, topping the men's, women's and overall standings.

== Tournament format ==
The 2021 World Championships used a two-stage format to determine the World Champions. Initially, players competed in separate groups over three days. The results were used to seed players for an elimination round. Thus, there was no team competition. Team standings were based on points earned from the singles and doubles competitions.

== Medal table ==
* Host nation (Guatemala)

| Rank | Nation | Gold | Silver | Bronze | Total |
|---|---|---|---|---|---|
| 1 | Mexico (MEX) | 3 | 0 | 0 | 3 |
| 2 | United States (USA) | 1 | 2 | 2 | 5 |
| 3 | Bolivia (BOL) | 0 | 1 | 0 | 1 |
| 3 | Costa Rica (CRC) | 0 | 1 | 0 | 1 |
| 5 | Colombia (COL) | 0 | 0 | 2 | 2 |
| 6 | Argentina (ARG) | 0 | 0 | 1 | 1 |
| 6 | Guatemala (GUA)* | 0 | 0 | 1 | 1 |
| Totals (7 entries) | | 4 | 4 | 6 | 14 |

== Events ==
=== Men's singles ===
Semifinals
(United States) Alejandro Landa | 3 | 15 | 11
(Bolivia) Conrrado Moscoso | 15 | 8 | 6
(Colombia) Mario Mercado | 15 | 12 | 9
(Costa Rica) Andrés Acuña | 12 | 15 | 11

Final
(United States) Alejandro Landa | 15 | 15
(Costa Rica) Andrés Acuña | 6 | 6

=== Women's singles ===
Semifinals
(Mexico) Paola Longoria | 15 | 15
(Argentina) Natalia Méndez | 10 | 1
(United States) Kelani Lawrence | 15 | 15
(United States) Rhonda Rajsich | 12 | 7

Final
(Mexico) Paola Longoria | 15 | 15
(United States) Kelani Lawrence | 6 | 1

=== Men's doubles ===
Semifinals
(Mexico) Javier Mar & Rodrigo Montoya | 15 | 15
(United States) Charlie Pratt & Alejandro Landa | 2 | 13
(Bolivia) Koko Keller & Conrrado Moscoso | 15 | 15
(Colombia) Mario Mercado & Andrés Gómez | 1 | 5

Final
(Mexico) Javier Mar & Rodrigo Montoya | 15 | 15
(Bolivia) Koko Keller & Conrrado Moscoso | 10 | 9

=== Women's doubles ===
Semifinals
(Mexico) Paola Longoria & Samantha Salas | 15 | 15
(Guatemala) María Renée Rodríguez & Ana Gabriela Martínez | 9 | 4
(United States) Rhonda Rajsich & Erika Manilla | 6 | 15 | 11
(Argentina) Natalia Méndez & Valeria Centellas | 15 | 9 | 8

Final
(Mexico) Paola Longoria & Samantha Salas | 15 | 15
(United States) Rhonda Rajsich & Erika Manilla | 14 | 6

== Team standings ==
=== Men's teams ===
| Place | Country |
|---|---|
| 1 | United States |
| 2 | Mexico |
| 3 | Bolivia |
| 4 | Costa Rica |

=== Women's teams ===
| Place | Country |
|---|---|
| 1 | Mexico |
| 2 | United States |
| 3 | Argentina |
| 4 | Guatemala |

=== Overall team standings ===
| Place | Country |
|---|---|
| 1 | United States |
| 2 | Mexico |
| 3 | Bolivia |
| 4 | Argentina |

== 2022 World Games qualifiers ==
=== Men ===
| Place | Player | Country |
|---|---|---|
| 1 | Alejandro Landa | United States |
| 2 | Andres Acuña | Costa Rica |
| 3 | Mario Mercado | Colombia |
| 4 | Conrrado Moscoso | Bolivia |
| 5 | Jake Bredenbeck | United States |
| 6 | Andres Parrilla | Mexico |
| 7 | José Daniel Ugalde | Ecuador |
| 8 | Juan José Salvatierra | Guatemala |
| 9 | Rodrigo Montoya | Mexico |
| 10 | Diego Garcia | Argentina |
| 11 | Felipe Camacho | Costa Rica |
| 12 | Shai Manzuri | Argentina |
| 13 | Kim Mingyu | South Korea |
| 14 | Ken Cottrell | Ireland |
| 15 | Lee Gunhee | South Korea |
| 16 | Eóin Tynan | Ireland |

=== Women ===
| Place | Player | Country |
|---|---|---|
| 1 | Paola Longoria | Mexico |
| 2 | Kelani Lawrence | United States |
| 3 | Rhonda Rajsich | United States |
| 4 | Natalia Mendez | Argentina |
| 5 | Angélica Barrios | Bolivia |
| 6 | Gabriela Martínez | Guatemala |
| 7 | Samantha Salas | Mexico |
| 8 | Maria Renee Rodriguez | Guatemala |
| 9 | Carla Muñoz | Chile |
| 10 | Maria Jose Vargas | Argentina |
| 11 | Cristina Amaya | Colombia |
| 12 | Michèle Morissette | Canada |
| 13 | Sumin Lee | South Korea |
| 14 | Aisling Hickey | Ireland |
| 15 | Majella Haverty | Ireland |
| 16 | Ayako Hanashi | Japan |
