= Tisinger =

Tisinger is a surname. Notable people with the surname include:

- Debbie Tisinger-Moore (born 1958), American racquetball player
- Janel Tisinger (born 1983), American racquetball player

== See also ==
- Tysinger
