= Andrés Acuña =

Costa Rican racquetball player

Personal information
- Full name: Andrés Acuña Araya
- Born: September 11, 1995 (age 30) San José, Costa Rica

Sport
- Sport: Racquetball
Medal record
Men's Racquetball
Representing Costa Rica
Event	1st	2nd	3rd
Pan American Games	0	0	2
World Championships	0	1	2
World Games	1	0	0
Pan American Championships	2	1	9
Central American and Caribbean Games	1	7	4
Total	4	9	17
Pan American Games
Bronze medal – third place	2023 Santiago	Doubles
Bronze medal – third place	2019 Lima	Doubles
World Championships
Bronze medal – third place	2024 San Antonio	Team
Bronze medal – third place	2022 San Luis Potosi	Singles
Silver medal – second place	2021 Guatemala City	Singles
World Games
Gold medal – first place	2022 Birmingham	Singles
Central American and Caribbean Games
Bronze medal – third place	2026 Santo Domingo	Singles
Bronze medal – third place	2026 Santo Domingo	Doubles
Gold medal – first place	2026 Santo Domingo	Mixed Doubles
Silver medal – second place	2026 Santo Domingo	Team
Bronze medal – third place	2023 Santo Domingo	Singles
Silver medal – second place	2023 Santo Domingo	Doubles
Bronze medal – third place	2023 Santo Domingo	Mixed Doubles
Silver medal – second place	2023 Santo Domingo	Team
Silver medal – second place	2018 Barranquilla	Singles
Silver medal – second place	2018 Barranquilla	Doubles
Silver medal – second place	2018 Barranquilla	Team
Silver medal – second place	2018 Veracruz	Team
Pan American Championships
Gold medal – first place	2026 Guatemala City	Mixed Doubles
Bronze medal – third place	2025 Guatemala City	Doubles
Bronze medal – third place	2025 Guatemala City	Team
Gold medal – first place	2024 Guatemala City	Doubles
Bronze medal – third place	2024 Guatemala City	Singles
Bronze medal – third place	2024 Guatemala City	Team
Bronze medal – third place	2023 Guatemala City	Doubles
Silver medal – second place	2022 Santa Cruz	Singles
Bronze medal – third place	2022 Santa Cruz	Doubles
Bronze medal – third place	2022 Santa Cruz	Team
Bronze medal – third place	2019 Barranquilla	Singles
Bronze medal – third place	2019 Barranquilla	Doubles

Andrés Acuña (born September 11, 1995) is a Costa Rican racquetball player. He is the current Pan American Champion in Mixed Doubles (with Larissa Faeth), winning the title in 2026 in Guatemala City, and they are also the current Central American and Caribbean Games Mixed Doubles champions winning that title in in 2026 in Santo Domingo, Dominican Republic. Acuña is a former World Games champion in racquetball, winning gold at the 2022 World Games, in Birmingham, Alabama. He was runner up at the 2021 International Racquetball Federation (IRF) 2021 World Championships in Men's Singles in Guatemala. Acuña has also won twice on the International Racquetball Tour.

== Junior years - 2009-2014 ==
Acuña played at the IRF World Junior Championships several times. In 2009 in Santo Domingo, Dominican Republic, he was in the semi-finals of Boys U14 singles and doubles. In singles, Acuña lost to Zachary Wertz of the US, 7–15, 15–12, 11–1. In doubles he and Andres Fabian Montecinos lost to Wertz and Adam Manilla, 15–7, 15–14.

In 2011, Acuña and Andres Fabian lost to Junior Rodriguez and Francisco De Leon of the Dominican Republic, 15–10, 15–13.

In Los Angeles in 2012, he was a finalist in Boy's U16 Singles, losing the final to Canadian Coby Iwaasa, 15–11, 15–13, after beating Mexican Erik Garcia in the semi-finals, 15–7, 7–15, 11–10. Acuña also got bronze in Boys U16 Doubles that year with Paublo Sauma, as they lost to Rodrigo Montoya and Javier Mar, 15–3, 14–15, 11–3.

Acuña played at the 2014 International Racquetball Federation (IRF) World Junior Championships in Cali, Colombia, reaching the semi-finals of Boy's U18 Singles where he lost to Conrrado Moscoso, 5–15, 15–4, 11–3.

== Playing for the National Team - 2012-2016 ==
Acuña played with the Costa Rican National Team when he was still a junior. He was at the 2012 World Championships in Santo Domingo, Dominican Republic, where he and Ivan Villegas lost to Ecuador's Jose Daniel Alvarez and Fernando Rios, 15–14, 15–14, in the Round of 16. The next year he played Men's Singles at the 2013 Central American Games in San José, Costa Rica, where he lost to Guatemalan Pedro Sandoval, 6–15, 15–8, 11–8.

At the 2014 Central American and Caribbean Games in Veracruz, Mexico, Acuña lost to Colombian Alejandro Herrera, 15–9, 14–15, 11–3, in the quarterfinals. But he helped Costa Rica into the final of the Men's Team event, which they lost to Mexico, resulting in silver medals for the team.

Acuña played at the Pan American Games for the first time in 2015, when the games were in Toronto. He lost in the Round of 16 in Men's Singles to Louis Perez of the Dominican Republic, 15–12, 9–15, 11–4, and he was part of the Costa Rica Men's Team that lost to Mexico in the quarterfinals.

At the 2016 World Championships in Cali, Colombia, Acuña played Men's Singles, and lost to Luis Perez of the Dominican Republic in the Round of 16, 10–15, 15–10, 11–7.

== First individual podium finishes - 2017-2020 ==
Acuña played the 2017 Pan American Championships on home soil in San José, Costa Rica, and that may have helped him reach the semi-finals for the first time, beating the USA's David Horn in the quarterfinals, 15–10, 15–12. In the semis, Acuña lost to Alejandro Landa of Mexico, 15–14, 15–10.

At the 2018 Pan American Championships in Temuco, Chile, Acuña lost in the quarterfinals to Rodrigo Montoya 15–12, 15–14.

He was on the podium three times at the 2018 Central American and Caribbean Games. In singles, Acuña lost to Mexican Daniel De La Rosa, 15–7, 15–7, in the semi-finals, which resulted in a bronze medal. Then he was runner up in both Men's Doubles and the Men's Team event. In doubles, he and Felipe Camacho defeated Colombians Set Cubillos and Mario Mercado, 15–4, 15–3, in the semi-finals, but lost to Mexicans Alvaro Beltran and De La Rosa, 15–9, 15–3. They also lost to Mexico in the Men's Team final.

The 2018 World Championships were in San José, Costa Rica, so Acuña was again competing on home soil. But this time he wasn't as successful, as he defeated Dominican Republic's Luis Perez, 15–3, 15–3, in the Round of 32 of Men's Singles, but then lost to Mexican Daniel De La Rosa, in the Round of 16, 15–9, 15–12.

Acuña was on the podium in both singles and doubles at the 2019 Pan American Racquetball Championships in Barranquilla, Colombia earning bronze medals in the two events. In Men's Singles, he defeated Ecuador's Fernando Rios in the Round of 16, 15–14, 15–2, then in the quarterfinals he beat top seed Mexican Alejandro Landa, 6–15, 15–14, 11–7, but lost to American Charles Pratt in the semi-finals, 15–13, 11–15, 11–7. In Men's Doubles, he and Felipe Camacho beat Argentinians Fernando Kurzbard and Shai Mazuri, 15–5, 12–15, 11–1, in the quarterfinals, but lost to Canadians Samuel Murray and Coby Iwaasa, 8–15, 15–1, 11–3, in the semi-finals.

Acuña and Camacho also played Men's Doubles at the 2019 Pan American Games in Lima, Peru, where they beat Guatemalans Edwin Galicia and Juan Salvatierra, 15–8, 15–5, in the quarterfinals, but lost to Bolivians Roland Keller and Conrrado Moscoso, 13–15, 15–12, 11–7, in the semi-finals. That got them a bronze medal, which was Costa Rica's first Pan Am Games medal in racquetball. In singles, Acuña didn't advance from the group, as he finished third behind Moscoso and Jose Daniel Ugalde of Ecuador. All three players were 1-1 after their matches: Acuña beat Ugalde and lost to Moscoso, but on point difference he lost out when Ugalde beat Moscoso. In the Men's Team event, Costa Rica beat Argentina, 2–0 in the 16s but lost to the US in the quarterfinals, 2–0.

Although Acuña has played a few events each season on the International Racquetball Tour starting in 2016–17, he didn't play full time until the 2019–20 season, when he finished #20 in the final rankings, including reaching the quarterfinals for the first time. He improved to 16 in 2021, and then 13 in 2022, when he made his first semi-final.

== Winning internationally and on the pro tour - 2021-present ==
Acuña was runner up in Men's Singles at the 2021 IRF World Championships in Guatemala City, Guatemala. He upset Rodrigo Montoya, the defending champion in Men's Singles, in the group stage, which helped seed him 2nd for the medal round. In the medal round, Acuña defeated team-mate Felipe Camacho, 15–5, 15–2, in the Round of 16, then Jose Daniel Ugalde of Ecuador, 15–6, 15–2, in the quarterfinals, and Colombian Mario Mercado, 12–15, 15–12, 11–9, in the semi-finals, before losing to American Alejandro Landa in the final, 15–6, 15–6.

His performance at the 2021 World Championships qualified Acuña for the 2022 World Games in Birmingham, Alabama, where he won gold. Acuña beat Colombian Mario Mercado in the semi-finals, 14–15, 15–13, 15–10, 15–10, and Mexican Rodrigo Montoya in the final, 15–12, 15–13, 15–14. It was the first gold medal by a player from outside of North America, and the first medal of any kind by a male player from outside of North America.

At the 2022 World Championships in San Luis Potosí, Mexico, Acuñan earned a bronze medal in singles, as he reached the semi-finals with a win over Guatemalan Edwin Galicia, 8–11, 11–4, 7–11, 11–5, 11–3, in the quarterfinals, but in the semis, he lost to American Rocky Carson, 8–11, 7–11, 11–7, 12–10, 11–4. He also played doubles in Mexico with his brother Sergio Acuña, and they lost in the quarterfinals to Canadians Coby Iwaasa and Samuel Murray, 11–3, 12–10, 11–8.

Acuña and Gabriel Garcia were bronze medalists in Men's Doubles at the 2023 Pan American Racquetball Championships in Guatemala City. They lost in the semi-finals to Bolivians Kadim Carrasco and Conrrado Moscoso, 8–11, 11–7, 11–4, 12–10. They reached the semis with by defeating Canadians Coby Iwaasa and Trevor Webb, 11–3, 11–2, 14–12, in the quarterfinals. In singles, Acuña lost to Bolivian Carlos Keller in the quarters, 6–11, 11–2, 12–10, 11–9.

Acuña competed at the 2023 Central American and Caribbean Games, and earned four medals: bronze in Men's Singles, silver in Men's Doubles with Gabriel Garcia, bronze in Mixed Doubles with Maricruz Ortiz, and silver in the Men's Team event.

Acuña was one of the Costa Rica flag bearers for the opening ceremonies of the 2023 Pan American Games in Santiago, Chile. In that competition, Acuña played men's singles, men's doubles, mixed doubles, and the men's team events. His best finish was in Men's doubles, as he and Gabriel Garcia reached the semi-finals, where they lost to Mexicans Javier Mar and Rodrigo Montoya, 11-4, 11-7, 11-4, resulting in bronze medals for Costa Rica.

Acuña and Gabriel Garcia were bronze medalists in Men's Doubles at the 2025 Pan American Racquetball Championships in Guatemala City. They lost in the semi-finals to Argentinians Diego Garcia and Gerson Miranda, 8–11, 4-11, 11–4, 13–11, 11-5. They reached the semis with by defeating Guatemalans Jose Caceres and Juan Salvatierra, 11-9, 5-11, 11-9, 14-16, 12-10, in the quarterfinals. They also were bronze medalists in the Men's Team event, losing in the semi-finals to the USA. In singles, Acuña lost in the quarterfinals to Canadian Samuel Murray, 11-7, 11-5, 6-11, 11-6.

Acuña won his first International Racquetball Tour event in September 2025, when he defeated Canadian Kane Waselenchuk in the final of the World Singles and Doubles Championships in Denver, 15-14, 15-6.

At the 2026 Pan American Racquetball Championships in Guatemala City, Guatemala, Acuña and Larissa Faeth won Mixed Doubles. They defeated Bolivians Rebecca Amaya and Conrrado Moscoso, 5-11, 11-6, 6-11, 11-5, 11-6, in the semi-finals and Argentinians Natalia Mendez and Gerson Miranda, 11-8, 11-8, 13-15, 11-7, in the final. Acuña lost in the quarterfinals of both Men's Singles and Doubles in Guatemala. In singles, he lost to Canadian Samuel Murray, 9-11, 11-4, 11-5, 11-5, and in doubles he and Felipe Segreda lost to Americans Jake Bredenbeck and Sam Bredenbeck, 11-7, 11-4, 11-6.

Acuña's second International Racquetball Tour title came in June 2026 in St Louis, Missouri, where he beat Mexican Eduardo Portillo, 15-7, 15-12, in the final of the KWM Gutterman Gateway City Pro/Am.

Acuña won gold in Mixed Doubles with Larissa Faeth at the 2026 Central American and Caribbean Games in Santo Domingo, Dominican Republic, as they defeated Mexicans Rodrigo Montoya and Jessica Parrilla, 6-11, 11-7, 11-4, 11-9. That was one of four medals Acuña earned in Santo Domingo. He got a silver medal in the Men's Team event, as Costa Rica lost to Mexico in the final, 2-0, including Acuña's five game loss to Eduardo Portillo, 11-2, 7-11, 11-5, 10-12, 11-6. He also got bronze medals in Men's Singles and Men's Doubles.

== Career summary ==
Acuña has represented Costa Rica for over a decade, and won over 20 medals, including four gold medals: one in singles at the 2022 World Games, one in men's doubles with Gabriel Garcia at the 2024 Pan American Racquetball Championships, and two in mixed doubles with Larissa Faeth at the 2026 Pan American Racquetball Championships and the 2026 Central American and Caribbean Games.

=== Career record ===
This table lists Acuña's results across annual events.

Event	2015	2016	2017	2018	2019	2020	2021	2022	2023	2024	2025-26
US Open	-	32	32	16	32	P	32	16	-	-	-
IRT Ranking	-		20	26	21	20	16	13	8	6	3
World Racquetball Tour Ranking	23	6	2	8	-	-	-	-	-	-	

Note: W = winner, F = finalist, SF = semi-finalist, QF = quarterfinalist, 16 = Round of 16. P = pandemic cancelled event.

== See also ==
- List of racquetball players
