= Tysinger =

Tysinger is a surname. Notable people with the surname include:

- Brandon Tysinger (born 1998), Japanese-American baseball player
- Jim Tysinger (1921–2013), American engineer and politician

== See also ==
- Tisinger
