= 2014 Racquetball World Championships – Men's singles =

- XVII Racquetball World Championships: Canada 2014 -
Host	Burlington, Ontario; Canada
Dates	June 14–21
- Men's singles
Gold	(United States) Rocky Carson
Silver	(Bolivia) Conrrado Moscoso
Bronze	(United States) Jose Rojas (Bolivia) Carlos Keller
- Women's singles
- Men's doubles
- Women's doubles

The International Racquetball Federation's 17th Racquetball World Championships were held in Burlington, Ontario, Canada, from June 14 to 21, 2014. This was the second time Worlds were in Canada. Previously, they were in Montreal in 1992.

In men's singles, American Rocky Carson was the three-time defending champion, and he won gold for a fourth time, which made him the most decorated men's racquetball player at the World Championships. In capturing the gold, Carson won all of his matches in two straight games.

Conrrado Moscoso of Bolivia was the surprise silver medalist. Moscoso defeated the 2012 silver medalist Polo Gutierrez of Mexico in the quarterfinals and the beat fellow Bolivian Carlos Keller in the semi-finals to reach the final.

The other semi-final was between two Americans: Carson and Jose Rojas. The Americans were on the same side of the draw, because Rojas lost to Fernando Rios of Ecuador in a great match that went tie-breaker in the round robin part of the competition. Sadly for Rios, his victory didn't lead to a great position in the elimination draw, as he had to play Gutierrez in the second round, as Gutierrez missed one of his round robin matches, which put him fourth in his group. Gutierrez defeated Rios in two games.

Mexican Álvaro Beltrán was the other former World Champion in the men's draw (Beltran won the title in 2000), but he lost early in the elimination round as a result of a forfeit to Jose Daniel Ugalde of Ecuador.

== Tournament format ==
The 2014 World Championships was the first competition with an initial round robin stage that was used to seed players for an elimination qualification round. Previously, players were seeded into an elimination round based on how their countries had done at previous World Championships, and then a second team competition was also played.

== Round robin ==
=== Pool A ===
Player	Pld	W	L	GF	GA	PF	PA	Points
(United States) Rocky Carson	3	3	0	6	0	90	35	6
(Cuba) Noslen Jimenez	3	2	1	4	3	76	86	5
(Argentina) Fernando Kurzbard	3	1	2	3	4	65	81	4
(Ecuador) Jose Daniel Ugalde	3	0	3	0	6	45	90	3

=== Pool B ===
Player	Pld	W	L	GF	GA	PF	PA	Points
(Canada) Tim Landeryou	3	3	0	6	1	96	48	6
(Catalonia) Victor Monterrat	3	2	1	4	3	70	75	5
(Venezuela) Ezequiel Paez	3	1	2	3	5	78	90	4
(Ukraine) Anthony DeFusto	3	0	3	2	6	70	79	3

=== Pool C ===
Player	Pld	W	L	GF	GA	PF	PA	Points
(United States) Jose Rojas	3	2	1	5	2	95	52	5
(Ecuador) Fernando Rios	3	3	0	6	1	93	51	6
(Argentina) Pablo Kurzbard	3	1	2	2	4	62	67	4
(Poland) Peter Rakowski	3	0	0	6	10	90	0	3

=== Pool D ===
Player	Pld	W	L	GF	GA	PF	PA	Points
(Canada) Samuel Murray	3	3	0	6	0	90	14	6
(Venezuela) Roberto Santander	3	2	1	4	2	67	37	5
(Catalonia) Dani Pascual	3	1	2	0	6	44	60	4
(England) Timothy Baghurst	0	0	3	0	0	0	0	0

=== Pool E ===
Player	Pld	W	L	GF	GA	PF	PA	Points
(Mexico) Álvaro Beltrán	3	3	0	6	0	90	30	6
(Costa Rica) Andres Aviles Solera	3	2	1	4	2	68	56	5
(Puerto Rico) Michael Barrett	3	0	3	0	6	33	90	3
(South Korea) Mingyu Kim	3	1	2	2	4	56	71	4

=== Pool F ===
Player	Pld	W	L	GF	GA	PF	PA	Points
(Japan) Michimune Kono	3	2	1	5	2	87	54	5
(Chile) Francisco Troncoso	3	2	1	4	3	76	65	5
(Dominican Republic) Ramón de León	3	2	1	4	3	97	74	5
(India) Rajiv Varadarajan	3	0	3	0	6	22	90	0

=== Pool G ===
Player	Pld	W	L	GF	GA	PF	PA	Points
(Costa Rica) Felipe Camacho	3	2	1	4	3	74	82	5
(Puerto Rico) Fernando Rivera	3	1	2	2	4	62	60	4
(South Korea) Daeyong Kwon	3	1	2	4	4	84	81	4
(Mexico) Polo Gutierrez	2	2	1	4	3	70	66	4

=== Pool H ===
Player	Pld	W	L	GF	GA	PF	PA	Points
(Japan) Takaaki Hirose	3	3	0	6	0	90	28	6
(Dominican Republic) Junior Rodríguez	3	2	1	4	2	70	57	5
(India) Alok Mehta	3	1	2	2	4	50	80	4
(Chile) Rodrigo Salgado	3	0	3	0	6	55	90	3

=== Pool I ===
Player	Pld	W	L	GF	GA	PF	PA	Points
(Colombia) Sebastian Franco	3	3	0	6	0	90	47	6
(Bolivia) Conrrado Moscoso	3	2	1	4	2	82	63	5
(Guatemala) Edwin Galicia	3	1	2	2	4	57	82	4
(Republic of Ireland) Mark Murphy	3	0	3	0	6	53	90	3

=== Pool J ===
Player	Pld	W	L	GF	GA	PF	PA	Points
(Bolivia) Carlos Keller	3	3	0	6	0	90	26	6
(Colombia) Alejandro Herrera	3	2	1	4	2	70	42	5
(Republic of Ireland) Patrick Hanley	3	1	2	2	4	58	60	4
(Guatemala) Pedro Manolo Sandoval	0	0	0	0	0	0	90	0

== Elimination round ==
First round
33	(Puerto Rico) Michael Barrett	15, 15
32	(Guatemala) Pedro Manolo Sandoval	0, 0
41
24
25
40
37	(Ecuador) Jose Daniel Ugalde	15, 15
28	(Puerto Rico) Fernando Rivera	2, 2
21
44
45
20
29	(Guatemala) Edwin Galicia	15, 15
36	(Chile) Rodrigo Salgado	4, 3
35	(Mexico) Polo Gutierrez	15, 15
30	(Republic of Ireland) Patrick Hanley	4, 9
43
22
27	(India) Alok Mehta	15, 15
38	(Ukraine) Anthony DeFusto	0, 0
39	(Republic of Ireland) Mark Murphy
26	(South Korea) Mingyu Kim
23
42
31	(India) Rajiv Varadarajan	15, 6, 4
34	(Poland) Peter Rakowski	5, 15, 11

Second round
1	(United States) Rocky Carson	15, 15
33	(Puerto Rico) Michael Barrett	3, 1
17	(South Korea) Daeyong Kwon	15, 15
16	(Catalonia) Victor Monterrat	11, 3
9	(Colombia) Sebastian Franco	15, 15
24	(Chile) Francisco Troncoso	4, 1
25	(Argentina) Pablo Kurzbard	8, 9
8	(Japan) Takaaki Hirose	15, 15
5	(Mexico) Álvaro Beltrán	0, 0
37	(Ecuador) José Daniel Ugalde	15, 15 – forfeit
21	(Venezuela) Ezequiel Páez	1, 10
12	(Colombia) Alejandro Herrera	15, 15
13	(Dominican Republic) Ramón de León	7, 2
20	(United States) José Rojas	15, 15
29	(Guatemala) Edwin Galicia	15, 15
4	(Canada) Samuel Murray	12, 12
3	(Ecuador) Fernando Rios	5, 6
35	(Mexico) Polo Gutierrez	15, 15
19	(Venezuela) Roberto Santander	15, 10, 0
14	(Costa Rica) Andres Aviles Solera	14, 15, 11
11	(Bolivia) Conrrado Moscoso	15, 15
22	(Argentina) Fernando Kurzbard	6, 14
27	(India) Alok Mehta	6, 6
6	(Japan) Michimune Kono	15, 15
7	(Costa Rica) Felipe Camacho	10, 15, 7
26	(South Korea) Mingyu Kim	15, 14, 11
23	(Catalonia) Dani Pascual	3, 10
10	(Bolivia) Carlos Keller	15, 15
15	(Dominican Republic) Junior Rodríguez	11, 7
18	(Cuba) Noslen Jiménez	15, 15
(Poland) Peter Rakowski	3, 1
2	(Canada) Tim Landeryou	15, 15

Third round
1	(United States) Rocky Carson	15, 15
17	(South Korea) Daeyong Kwan	4, 1
9	(Colombia) Sebastian Franco	15, 15
8	(Japan) Takaaki Hirose	11, 8
37	(Ecuador) José Daniel Ugalde	11, 15, 4
12	(Colombia) Alejandro Herrera	15, 8, 11
20	(United States) José Rojas	15, 15
29	(Guatemala) Edwin Galicia	4, 10
35	(Mexico) Polo Gutiérrez	15, 15
14	(Costa Rica) Andres Aviles Solera	6, 6
11	(Bolivia) Conrrado Moscoso	15, 15
6	(Japan) Michimune Kono	9, 11
26	(Korea) Mingyu Kim	7, 6
10	(Bolivia) Carlos Keller	15, 15
18	(Cuba) Noslen Jiménez	11, 10
2	(Canada) Tim Landeryou	15, 15

Quarterfinals
1	(United States) Rocky Carson	15, 15
9	(Colombia) Sebastian Franco	8, 10
12	(Colombia) Alejandro Herrera	6, 7
20	(United States) José Rojas	15, 15
35	(Mexico) Polo Gutiérrez	14, 15, 10
11	(Bolivia) Conrrado Moscoso	15, 2, 11
10	(Bolivia) Carlos Keller	15, 15
2	(Canada) Tim Landeryou	6, 12

Semifinals
1	(United States) Rocky Carson	15, 15
20	(United States) Jose Rojas	8, 12
11	(Bolivia) Conrrado Moscoso	15, 11, 11
10	(Bolivia) Carlos Keller	11, 15, 3

Final
1	(United States) Rocky Carson	15, 15
11	(Bolivia) Conrrado Moscoso	3, 8

Winner
Rocky Carson (United States)
