= 2014 Racquetball World Championships – Men's doubles =

- XVII Racquetball World Championships: Canada 2014 -
Host	Burlington, Ontario; Canada
Dates	June 14–21
- Men's singles
- Women's singles
- Men's doubles
Gold	(Colombia) Sebastian Franco & Alejandro Herrera
Silver	(Canada) Mike Green & Vincent Gagnon
Bronze	(Bolivia) Conrrado Moscoso & Mario Mercado (United States) Ben Croft & Tom Fuhrmann
- Women's doubles

The International Racquetball Federation's 17th Racquetball World Championships were held in Burlington, Ontario, Canada, from June 14 to 21, 2014. This was the second time Worlds were in Canada. Previously, they were in Montreal in 1992.

The men's doubles final was between two surprise finalists, as neither the #1 seeded USA team of Ben Croft and Tom Fuhrmann nor #2 seeds Mexicans Álvaro Beltrán and Edson Martinez made the final. In fact, the Mexicans didn't even make the podium.

Instead, Colombians Sebastian Franco and Alejandro Herrera defeated Canadians Mike Green and Vincent Gagnon in the final, 15–11, 15–5, which was the first Men's doubles World Championship not won by either the USA or Mexico. The Canadians had defeated the Colombians in two straight games in the round robin stage of play, but Colombia was able to reverse that result in the final.

Franco and Herrera defeated Beltran and Martinez in the quarter-finals, denying the Mexicans a place on the podium, and then beat Bolivians Conrrado Moscoso and Mario Mercado in the semi-finals. Green and Gagnon beat Americans Croft and Fuhrmann in the other semi-final. Croft won gold in Men's doubles (with Mitch Williams) at his previous appearance at Worlds in 2010.

== Tournament format ==
The 2014 World Championships was the first competition with an initial round robin stage that was used to seed players for an elimination qualification round. Previously, players were seeded into an elimination round based on how their countries had done at previous World Championships, and then a second team competition was also played.

== Round robin ==
=== Pool A ===
Player	Pld	W	L	GF	GA	PF	PA	Points
(United States) Ben Croft & Tom Fuhrmann	2	2	0	4	0	60	23	4
(Costa Rica) Joaquin Solera & Pablo Sauma	2	1	1	2	2	43	40	3
(Chile) Francisco Troncoso & Rodrigo Salgado	2	0	2	0	4	20	60	2

=== Pool B ===
Player	Pld	W	L	GF	GA	PF	PA	Points
(Mexico) Álvaro Beltrán & Edson Martinez	2	2	0	4	0	60	15	4
(Dominican Republic) Luis Pérez & Junior Rodríguez	2	1	1	2	2	45	30	3
(Guatemala) Pedro Manolo Sandoval & Edwin Galicia	0	0	2	0	4	0	60	0

=== Pool C ===
Player	Pld	W	L	GF	GA	PF	PA	Points
(Venezuela) César Castillo & César Castro	3	3	0	6	1	95	64	4
(Ecuador) Fernando Rios & Jose Daniel Alvarez	3	2	1	5	3	105	61	3
(South Korea) Mingyu Kim & Daeyong Kwon	3	1	2	3	4	71	68	0
(Catalonia) Victor Montserrat & Dani Pascual	3	0	3	0	6	25	90	0

=== Pool D ===
Player	Pld	W	L	GF	GA	PF	PA	Points
(Canada) Mike Green & Vincent Gagnon	3	3	0	6	0	90	38	6
(Colombia) Sebastian Franco & Alejandro Herrera	3	2	1	4	2	82	52	5
(Japan) Hiroshi Shimizu & Michimune Kono	3	1	2	2	4	59	68	4
(Puerto Rico) Michael Barrett & Fernando Rivera	3	0	3	0	6	17	90	3

=== Pool E ===
Player	Pld	W	L	GF	GA	PF	PA	Points
(Argentina) Daniel Maggi & Shai Manzuri	3	3	0	6	1	97	45	6
(Bolivia) Conrrado Moscoso & Mario Mercado	3	2	1	5	2	88	57	5
(Republic of Ireland) Pat O'Donnell & Conor Skehan	3	1	2	2	4	53	75	4
(India) Pratap Ballalasamudra & Sumeet Kamat	3	0	3	0	6	29	90	3

== Elimination round ==
Round of 32
1	(United States) Ben Croft & Tom Fuhrmann
17	(Puerto Rico) Michael Barrett & Fernando Rivera	15, 15
16	(India) Pratap Ballalasamudra & Sumeet Kamat	6, 4
9	(Dominican Republic) Luis Pérez & Junior Rodríguez
8	(Ecuador) Fernando Rios & Jose Daniel Alvarez
5	(Argentina) Daniel Maggi & Shai Manzuri
12	(Guatemala) Pedro Manolo Sandoval & Edwin Galicia
13	(South Korea) Mingyu Kim & Daeyong Kwon
4	(Canada) Mike Green & Vincent Gagnon
3	(Venezuela) César Castillo & César Castro
14	(Japan) Hiroshi Shimizu & Michimune Kono
11	(Chile) Francisco Troncoso & Rodrigo Salgado
6	(Bolivia) Conrrado Moscoso & Mario Mercado
7	(Colombia) Sebastian Franco & Alejandro Herrera
10	(Costa Rica) Joaquin Solera & Pablo Sauma
15	(Republic of Ireland) Pat O'Donnell & Conor Skehan	15, 15
18	(Catalonia) Victor Montserrat & Dani Pascual	10, 13
(Mexico) Álvaro Beltrán & Edson Martinez

Round of 16
1	(United States) USA	15, 15
17	Puerto Rico	0, 0 – forfeit
9	Dominican Republic	13, 3
8	Ecuador	15, 15
5	Argentina	15, 15 – forfeit
12	Guatemala	0, 0
13	South Korea	10, 1
4	Canada	15, 15
3	Venezuela	15, 15
14	Japan	6, 14
11	Chile	8, 5
6	Bolivia	15, 15
7	Colombia	10, 15, 11
10	Costa Rica	15, 9, 6
15	(Republic of Ireland) Ireland	1, 12
2	Mexico	15, 15

Quarter finals
1	(United States) USA	15, 15
8	Ecuador	11, 13
5	Argentina	7, 7
4	Canada	15, 15
3	Venezuela	15, 6, 9
6	Bolivia	10, 15, 11
7	Colombia	15, 6, 11
2	Mexico	14, 15, 9

Semi finals
1	USA	11, 2
4	Canada	15, 15
6	Bolivia	11, 2
7	Colombia	15, 15

Finals
4	Canada	11, 5
7	Colombia	15, 15

Winners
(Colombia) Sebastian Franco & Alejandro Herrera
