= 2014 Racquetball World Championships – Women's doubles =

- XVII Racquetball World Championships: Canada 2014 -
Host	Burlington, Ontario; Canada
Dates	June 14–21
- Men's singles
- Women's singles
- Men's doubles
- Women's doubles
Gold	(Mexico) Paola Longoria & Samantha Salas
Silver	(United States) Aimee Ruiz & Janel Tisinger
Bronze	(Chile) Angela Grisar & Carla Muñoz (Ecuador) Veronica Sotomayor & Maria Paz Muñoz

The International Racquetball Federation's 17th Racquetball World Championships were held in Burlington, Ontario, Canada, from June 14 to 21, 2014. This was the second time Worlds were in Canada wherein previously, they were in Montreal in 1992.

The women's doubles defending champions were Mexicans Paola Longoria and Samantha Salas and they won gold for a third straight time. In the final, they defeated American Aimee Ruiz, a former World Champion doubles player, and Janel Tisinger in two straight games. Longoria and Salas beat the Chilean team of Angela Grisar and Carla Muñoz in the semi-finals, which was a rematch of the 2012 final.

In the other semi-final, Ruiz and Tisinger needed to come back after losing the first game against the Ecuador team of Veronica Sotomayor and Maria Paz Muñoz, winning the match in a tie-breaker.

== Tournament format ==
The 2014 World Championships was the first competition with an initial round robin stage that was used to seed players for an elimination qualification round. Previously, players were seeded into an elimination round based on how their countries had done at previous World Championships, and then a second team competition was also played. This year there was no team competition.

== Round robin ==
=== Pool A ===
Player	Pld	W	L	GF	GA	PF	PA	Points
(Mexico) Paola Longoria & Samantha Salas	3	3	0	6	0	90	18	6
(Venezuela) Mariana Paredes & Mariana Tobon	3	2	1	4	2	52	57	5
(South Korea) Jin Young Seok & Jung Eun Ane	3	1	2	2	4	53	60	4
(Catalonia) Anna Ventura & Bet Consegal	2	0	2	0	6	13	90	2

=== Pool B ===
Player	Pld	W	L	GF	GA	PF	PA	Points
(United States) Aimee Ruiz & Janel Tisinger	3	3	0	6	0	90	18	6
(Argentina) Véronique Guillemette & Maria Jose Vargas	3	2	1	4	2	52	57	5
(Ecuador) Maria Paz Muñoz & Veronica Sotomayor	3	1	2	2	4	53	60	4
(Guatemala) Maria Renee Rodriguez & Gabriela Martinez	2	0	2	0	6	13	90	2

=== Pool C ===
Player	Pld	W	L	GF	GA	PF	PA	Points
(Canada) Frédérique Lambert & Jennifer Saunders	3	3	0	6	1	98	50	6
(Bolivia) Natalia Mendez & Adriana Riveros	3	2	1	4	2	92	60	5
(Dominican Republic) María Céspedes & Merynanyelly Delgado	3	1	2	2	4	44	72	4
(Republic of Ireland) Majella Haverty & Katie Kenny	2	0	2	0	6	38	90	2

=== Pool D ===
Player	Pld	W	L	GF	GA	PF	PA	Points
(Chile) Angela Grisar & Carla Muñoz	3	3	0	6	0	96	59	6
(Japan) Maiko Sato & Naomi Wakimoto	3	1	2	4	2	86	77	4
(Costa Rica) Melania Sauma & Sofia Soley	3	1	2	2	4	56	75	4
(Colombia) Cristina Amaya & Claudia Andrade	3	1	2	0	6	63	78	4

== Elimination round ==
Round of 16
1	(Mexico) Paola Longoria & Samantha Salas	15, 15
16	(Guatemala) Maria Renee Rodriguez & Gabriela Martinez	6, 4
9	(Costa Rica) Melania Sauma & Sofia Soley	10, 7
8	(Bolivia) Natalia Mendez & Adriana Riveros	15, 15
5	(Argentina) Véronique Guillemette & Maria Jose Vargas	15, 1, 11
12	(South Korea) Jin Young Seok & Jung Eun Ane	9, 15, 7
13	(Republic of Ireland) Majella Haverty & Katie Kenny	7, 3
4	(Chile) Angela Grisar & Carla Muñoz	15, 15
3	(Canada) Frédérique Lambert & Jennifer Saunders	14, 15, 11
14	(Colombia) Cristina Amaya & Claudia Andrade	15, 6, 6
11	(Ecuador) Maria Paz Muñoz & Veronica Sotomayor	15, 15
6	(Venezuela) Mariana Paredes & Mariana Tobon	2, 9
7	(Japan) Maiko Sato & Naomi Wakimoto	15, 15
10	(Dominican Republic) María Céspedes & Merynanyelly Delgado	9, 8
15	(Catalonia) Anna Ventura & Bet Consegal	0, 1
2	(United States) Aimee Ruiz & Janel Tisinger	15, 15

Quarter finals
1	Mexico	15, 15
8	Bolivia	5, 12
5	Argentina	15, 3, 8
4	Chile	8, 15, 11
3	Canada	6, 15, 8
11	Ecuador	15, 7, 11
7	Japan	7, 3
2	(United States) USA	15, 15

Semi finals
1	Mexico'	15, 15
4	Chile	1, 3
11	Ecuador	15, 4, 4
2	(United States) USA	6, 15, 11

Finals
1	Mexico	15, 15
2	(United States) USA	4, 12

Winners
(Mexico) Paola Longoria & Samantha Salas
