= 2014 Racquetball World Championships – Women's singles =

- XVII Racquetball World Championships: Canada 2014 -
Host	Burlington, Ontario; Canada
Dates	June 14–21
- Men's singles
- Women's singles
Gold	(Mexico) Paola Longoria
Silver	(United States) Rhonda Rajsich
Bronze	(Argentina) Maria Jose Vargas (Mexico) Samantha Salas
- Men's doubles
- Women's doubles

The International Racquetball Federation's 17th Racquetball World Championships were held in Burlington, Ontario, Canada, from June 14 to 21, 2014. This was the second time Worlds were in Canada. Previously, they were in Montreal in 1992.

In women's singles, Mexican Paola Longoria was the defending champion, and she successfully defended her title by defeating Rhonda Rajsich of the US in the final, 15–6, 15–8. Longoria didn't lose any games en route to the title, including a straight games win in the semi-finals against Maria Jose Vargas, who was playing for Argentina after previously competing for Bolivia.

Unlike Longoria, Rajsich was pushed to tie-breakers twice in the early rounds, as she needed three games to defeat both fellow American Aubrey Kirch (in the second round) and Colombian Cristina Amaya in the quarterfinals. Indeed, Amaya had match points on Rajsich in both games two and three, but couldn't convert them, as Rajsich won 12–15, 15–14, 11–10. But in the semi-final, Rajsich beat Samantha Salas of Mexico in two straight games, 15–11, 15–9.

== Tournament format ==
The 2014 World Championships was the first competition with an initial round robin stage that was used to seed players for an elimination qualification round. Previously, players were seeded into an elimination round based on how their countries had done at previous World Championships, and then a second team competition was also played.

== Round robin ==
=== Pool A ===
Player	Pld	W	L	GF	GA	PF	PA	Points
(United States) Rhonda Rajsich	2	2	0	4	0	60	12	4
(Costa Rica) Melania Sauma Masis	2	1	1	2	3	41	65	3
(Venezuela) Mariana Paredes	2	0	2	1	4	43	67	2

=== Pool B ===
Player	Pld	W	L	GF	GA	PF	PA	Points
(Mexico) Paola Longoria	2	2	0	4	0	60	13	4
(Venezuela) Mariana Tobon	2	1	1	2	2	41	52	3
(Costa Rica) Sofia Soley Saborio	2	0	2	0	4	24	60	2

=== Pool C ===
Player	Pld	W	L	GF	GA	PF	PA	Points
(Ecuador) Maria Paz Muñoz	2	2	0	4	1	69	41	4
(United States) Aubrey Kirch	2	1	1	3	2	58	58	3
(Republic of Ireland) Aisling Hickey	2	0	2	0	4	32	60	2

=== Pool D ===
Player	Pld	W	L	GF	GA	PF	PA	Points
(Mexico) Samantha Salas	3	3	0	6	1	98	38	6
(Bolivia) Jenny Daza	3	2	1	5	2	86	58	5
(Dominican Republic) María Céspedes	3	1	2	2	4	53	77	4
(Cuba) Disney Linares Barreras	3	0	3	0	6	26	90	3

=== Pool E ===
Player	Pld	W	L	GF	GA	PF	PA	Points
(Ecuador) Veronica Sotomayor	3	3	0	6	0	90	14	6
(Canada) Christine Richardson	3	2	1	4	2	70	38	5
(Republic of Ireland) Donna Ryder	3	1	2	2	4	39	79	4
(Catalonia) Anna Ventura	3	0	3	0	6	22	90	3

=== Pool F ===
Player	Pld	W	L	GF	GA	PF	PA	Points
(Argentina) Véronique Guillemette	3	3	0	6	0	90	59	6
(Bolivia) Natalia Mendez	3	2	1	4	2	84	53	5
(Japan) Harumi Kajino	3	1	2	2	4	65	67	4
(Dominican Republic) Merynanyelly Delgado	3	0	0	0	6	30	90	3

=== Pool G ===
Player	Pld	W	L	GF	GA	PF	PA	Points
(Guatemala) Maria Renee Rodriguez	3	3	0	6	0	90	30	6
(Canada) Michéle Morissette	3	2	1	4	2	81	57	5
(Catalonia) Bet Consegal	3	1	2	2	5	60	87	4
(Chile) Maria Paz Riquelme	3	0	3	1	6	40	97	3

=== Pool H ===
Player	Pld	W	L	GF	GA	PF	PA	Points
(Colombia) Cristina Amaya	3	3	0	6	0	90	53	6
(Argentina) Maria Jose Vargas	3	2	1	4	2	78	50	5
(South Korea) Jung Eun Ane	3	1	2	2	4	57	78	4
(Japan) Maiko Satoh	3	0	3	0	6	46	90	3

=== Pool I ===
Player	Pld	W	L	GF	GA	PF	PA	Points
(Chile) Carla Muñoz	3	3	0	6	1	91	55	6
(South Korea) Jin Seok	3	2	1	4	2	84	57	5
(Guatemala) Gabriela Martinez	3	1	2	3	4	70	69	4
(Colombia) Claudia Andrade	3	0	3	0	6	26	90	3

== Elimination round ==
First round
33	(Cuba) Disney Linares Barreras	15, 15
32	(Catalonia) Anna Ventura	11, 5
21
44
45
20
26
23
42

Second round
1	(United States) Rhonda Rajsich	15, 15
33	(Cuba) Disney Linares Barreras	7, 3
17	(Venezuela) Mariana Tobon	11, 9
16	(United States) Aubrey Kirch	15, 15
9	(Chile) Carla Muñoz	15, 15
24	(Japan) Harumi Kajino	10, 4
25	(Catalonia) Bat Consegal	3, 8
8	(Colombia) Cristina Amaya	15, 15
5	(Ecuador) Veronica Sotomayor	15, 15
37	(Colombia) Claudia Andrade	1, 1
21	(Republic of Ireland) Aisling Hickey	14, 13
12	(Canada) Michèle Morissette	15, 15
13	(Bolivia) Natalia Mendez	13, 13
20	(Costa Rica) Sofia Soley	15, 15
29	(Japan) Maiko Sato	2, 2
4	(Mexico) Samantha Salas	15, 15
3	(Ecuador) Maria Paz Muñoz	15, 15
30	(Chile) Maria Paz Riquelme	4, 3
19	(Venezuela) Mariana Paredes	6, 3
14	(Canada) Christine Richardson	15, 15
11	(Argentina) María Jose Vargas	15, 15
22	(Dominican Republic) María Céspedes	4, 5
27	(Guatemala) Gabriela Martinez	15, 10, 11
6	(Argentina) Véronique Guillemette	9, 15, 6
7	(Guatemala) María Renee Rodríguez	15, 7, 6
26	(South Korea) Jung Eun Ane	14, 15, 11
23	(Republic of Ireland) Donna Ryder	2, 2
10	(South Korea) Jin Young Seon	15, 15
15	(Bolivia) Jenny Daza	15, 15
18	(Costa Rica) Melania Sauma	4, 4
(Dominican Republic) Merynanyelly Delgado	0, 2
2	(Mexico) Paola Longoria	15, 15

Third round
1	(United States) Rhonda Rajsich	11, 15, 15
17	(United States) Aubrey Kirch	15, 11, 4
9	(Chile) Carla Muñoz	0, 15, 8
8	(Colombia) Cristina Amaya	15, 9, 11
37	(Ecuador) Veronica Sotomayor	15, 15
12	(Canada) Michèle Morissette	11, 6
20	(Costa Rica) Sofia Soley	1, 3
29	(Mexico) Samantha Salas	15, 15
35	(Ecuador) Maria Paz Muñoz	15, 11, 10
14	(Canada) Christine Richardson	14, 15, 11
11	(Argentina) Maria Jose Vargas	15, 15
6	(Guatemala) Gabriela Martinez	5, 5
26	(Korea) Jung Eun Ane	11, 13
10	(Korea) Jin Young Seok	15, 15
18	(Bolivia) Jenny Daza	9, 1
2	(Mexico) Paola Longoria	15, 15

Quarterfinals
1	(United States) Rhonda Rajsich	12, 15, 11
8	(Colombia) Cristina Amaya	15, 14, 10
12	(Ecuador) Veronica Sotomayor	4, 15, 8
13	(Mexico) Samantha Salas	15, 9, 11
3	(Canada) Christine Richardson	6, 1
6	(Argentina) Maria Jose Vargas	15, 15
10	(South Korea) Jin Young Seok	4, 5
2	(Mexico) Paola Longoria	15, 15

Semifinals
1	(United States) Rhonda Rajsich	15, 15
13	(Mexico) Samantha Salas	11, 9
6	(Argentina) Maria Jose Vargas	5, 9
2	(Mexico) Paola Longoria	15, 15

Final
1	(United States) Rhonda Rajsich	6, 8
2	(Mexico) Paola Longoria	15, 15

Women's singles Winner
(Mexico) Paola Longoria
