= 2016 Racquetball World Championships – Men's doubles =

- XVIII Racquetball World Championships: Colombia 2016 -
Host	Cali, Colombia
Dates	July 15–23
- Men's singles
- Women's singles
- Men's doubles
Gold	(Mexico) Álvaro Beltrán & Javier Moreno
Silver	(United States) Jake Bredenbeck & José Díaz
Bronze	(Colombia) Sebastian Franco & Alejandro Herrera and (Bolivia) Kadim Carrasco & Carlos Keller
- Women's doubles

The International Racquetball Federation's 18th Racquetball World Championships were held in Cali, Colombia, from July 15 to 23, 2016. This was Colombia's first time hosting the tournament, and the first time it was held in South America since 1998, when Cochabamba, Bolivia, was host.

Mexicans Álvaro Beltrán and Javier Moreno won the men's doubles World Championship for the third time as a team, when the defeated Americans Jake Bredenbeck and Jose Diaz in the final, 15–12, 15–9. Previously, the Mexicans had won in 2006 and 2012. Moreno also won the title in 2000 with Luis Bustilos. The Mexicans defeated the defending World Champions, Sebastian Franco and Alejandro Herrera of Colombia, in the semi-finals.

== Tournament format ==
The 2016 World Championships was a two-stage competition. There was an initial group stage played as a round robin with the results used to seed teams for the medal round.

== Round robin ==
=== Pool A ===
Players	Pld	W	L	GF	GA	PF	PA	Points
(United States) Jake Bredenbeck & José Díaz	3	3	0	6	1	92	54	6
(Ecuador) Fernando Rios & José Daniel Ugalde	3	2	1	5	2	92	48	5
(Guatemala) Hanzel Martinez & Juan José Salvatierra	3	1	2	2	4	51	84	4
(Honduras) Raúl Banegas & Sergio Ortega	3	0	3	0	6	41	90	3

=== Pool B ===
Players	Pld	W	L	GF	GA	PF	PA	Points
(Mexico) Álvaro Beltrán & Javier Moreno	3	3	0	6	1	96	44	6
(Costa Rica) Felipe Camacho & Teobaldo Fumero	3	2	1	5	2	83	54	5
(Argentina) Franco Capandegui & Fernando Kurzbard	3	1	2	0	4	52	65	4
(Puerto Rico) Aaron Booker & John Maisonet	3	0	3	0	4	22	90	4

=== Pool C ===
Players	Pld	W	L	GF	GA	PF	PA	Points
(Colombia) Sebastian Franco & Alejandro Herrera	3	3	0	6	1	96	42	6
(Canada) Mike Green & Tim Landeryou	3	2	1	5	2	80	64	5
(Dominican Republic) Luis Pérez & Ramón de León	3	1	2	2	4	70	51	4
(India) Alok Mehta & Thirumurugan Thiyagarajan	3	0	3	0	6	21	90	3

=== Pool D ===
Players	Pld	W	L	GF	GA	PF	PA	Points
(Bolivia) Kadim Carrasco & Carlos Keller	3	2	1	6	0	90	28	6
(Japan) Yuki Nakano & Michimune Kono	3	1	2	3	4	66	79	4
(Venezuela) Luis Reveron & Alejandro Santos	3	1	2	3	5	74	86	4
(South Korea) Park Ju Yong & Daeyong Kwon	3	1	2	2	5	57	94	4

== Elimination round ==
Round of 16
1	(United States) Jake Bredenbeck & José Díaz	15, 15
16	(South Korea) Park Ju Yong & Daeyong Kwon	8, 5
9	(Dominican Republic) Ramón de León & Luis Pérez	15, 10, 7
8	(Costa Rica) Felipe Camacho & Teobaldo Fumero	14, 15, 11
5	(Canada) Mike Green & Tim Landeryou	15, 15
12	(Argentina) Franco Capandegui & Fernando Kurzbard	9, 5
13	(Honduras) Raúl Banegas & Sergio Ortega	9, 4
4	(Bolivia) Kadim Carrasco & Carlos Keller	15, 15
3	(Colombia) Sebastian Franco & Alejandro Herrera	15, 15
14	(Puerto Rico) Aaron Booker & John Maisonet	2, 1
11	(Guatemala) Hanzel Martinez & Juan José Salvatierra	11, 5
6	(Japan) Michimune Kono & Yuki Nakano	15, 15
7	(Ecuador) Fernando Rios & Jose Daniel Ugalde	15, 15
10	(Venezuela) Luis Reveron & Alejandro Santos	1, 7
15	(India) Alok Mehta & Thirumurugan Thiyagarajan	3, 2
2	(Mexico) Álvaro Beltrán & Javier Moreno	15, 15

Quarter finals
1	(United States) USA	15, 15
8	Costa Rica	9, 9
5	Canada	15, 2, 8
4	Bolivia	6, 15, 11
3	Colombia	15, 15
11	(Japan)	5, 4
10	Ecuador	7, 6
2	Mexico	15, 15

Semi finals
1	(United States) USA	15, 8, 11
4	Bolivia	14, 15, 8
3	Colombia	2, 5
2	Mexico	15, 15

Finals
1	USA	12, 9
2	Mexico	15, 15

Winners
(Mexico) Álvaro Beltrán & Javier Moreno
