= 2016 Racquetball World Championships – Women's doubles =

- XVIII Racquetball World Championships: Colombia 2016 -
Host	Cali, Colombia
Dates	July 15–23
- Men's singles
- Women's singles
- Men's doubles
- Women's doubles
Gold	(United States) Aimee Ruiz & Janel Tisinger
Silver	(Mexico) Paola Longoria & Samantha Salas
Bronze	(Bolivia) Jenny Daza & Adriana Riveros (Canada) Frédérique Lambert & Jennifer Saunders

The International Racquetball Federation's 18th Racquetball World Championships were held in Cali, Colombia, from July 15 to 23, 2016. This was the first time Worlds were in Colombia, and the first time the event was held in South America since 1998, when Cochabamba, Bolivia, was host.

In the final, Americans Aimee Ruiz and Janel Tisinger upset Mexicans Paola Longoria and Samantha Salas, who were the three time defending champions in women's doubles. Ruiz and Tisinger were silver medalists in 2014, when they lost to the Mexicans in the final. The win was Ruiz's third World Championship in women's doubles, as she also won in 2006 with Laura Fenton and 2008 with Jackie Paraiso. It was Tisinger's first World Championship.

== Tournament format ==
The 2016 World Championships was a two-stage competition. There was an initial group stage played as a round robin with the results used to seed teams for the medal round.

== Round robin ==
=== Pool A ===
Players	Pld	W	L	GF	GA	PF	PA	Points
(Mexico) Paola Longoria & Samantha Salas	2	2	0	4	0	53	8	4
(Venezuela) Mariana Tobon & Lilian Zea	3	1	1	2	3	43	56	3
(Argentina) Cecilia Cerquetti & Pia Dati	3	0	2	1	4	30	62	2

=== Pool B ===
Players	Pld	W	L	GF	GA	PF	PA	Points
(United States) Aimee Ruiz & Janel Tisinger	2	2	0	4	1	62	41	4
(Guatemala) María Rene Rodríguez & Gabriela Martinez	2	1	1	2	2	46	42	3
(South Korea) Jin Young Seok & Jung Eun Ane	2	0	2	1	4	36	62	2

=== Pool C ===
Players	Pld	W	L	GF	GA	PF	PA	Points
(Canada) Frédérique Lambert & Jennifer Saunders	2	2	0	4	0	60	24	4
(Bolivia) Jenny Daza & Adriana Riveros	2	1	1	2	2	44	44	3
(Colombia) Cristina Amaya & Claudia Andrade	2	0	2	0	4	24	60	2

=== Pool D ===
Players	Pld	W	L	GF	GA	PF	PA	Points
(Ecuador) Maria Paz Muñoz & Veronica Sotomayor	3	3	0	6	0	90	36	6
(Japan) Maiko Sato & Naomi Wakimoto	3	2	1	4	4	91	96	5
(Dominican Republic) María Céspedes & Merynanyelly Delgado	3	1	2	3	4	75	75	4
(Republic of Ireland) Majella Haverty & Donna Ryder	3	0	3	1	6	45	94	3

== Elimination round ==
Round of 16
1	(Mexico) Paola Longoria & Samantha Salas
9	(Colombia) Cristina Amaya & Carolina Gomez	15, 13, 8
8	(Guatemala) María Rene Rodríguez & Gabriela Martinez	13, 15, 11
5	(Bolivia) Jenny Daza & Adriana Riveros	15, 15
12	(South Korea) Jin Young Seok & Jung Eun Ane	10, 6
13	(Republic of Ireland) Majella Haverty & Donna Ryder	4, 3
4	(Ecuador) María Paz Muñoz & Verónica Sotomayor	15, 15
3	(Canada) Frédérique Lambert & Jennifer Saunders
11	(Argentina) Pia Dati & Maria Jose Vargas	15, 15
6	(Japan) Harumi Kajino & Toshiko Sakamoto	7, 9
7	(Venezuela) Mariana Tobon & Lilian Zea	3, 6
10	(Dominican Republic) María Céspedes & Merynanyelly Delgado	15, 15
2	(United States) Aimee Ruiz & Janel Tisinger

Quarter finals
1	Mexico	15, 15
8	Guatemala	2, 5
5	Bolivia	15, 15
4	Ecuador	9, 8
3	Canada	15, 15
11	Argentina	7, 9
10	Dominican Republic	6, 8
2	(United States) USA	15, 15

Semi finals
1	Mexico	15, 15
5	Bolivia	5, 5
3	Canada	8, 7
2	(United States) USA	15, 15

Finals
1	Mexico	11, 15, 8
2	(United States) USA	15, 9, 11

Winners
(United States) Aimee Ruiz & Janel Tisinger
