= 2018 Racquetball World Championships – Men's singles =

- XIX Racquetball World Championships: Costa Rica 2018 -
Host	San José, Costa Rica
Dates	August 10–18
- Men's singles
Gold	(Mexico) Rodrigo Montoya
Silver	(United States) Charles Pratt
Bronze	(United States) David Horn (Colombia) Sebastian Franco
- Women's singles
- Men's doubles
- Women's doubles

The International Racquetball Federation's 19th Racquetball World Championships are being held in San José, Costa Rica from August 10–18. This is the first time Worlds have been Costa Rica, and the first time a Central American country has hosted the event.

== Tournament format ==
The 2018 World Championships used a two stage format with an initial group stage that was a round robin with the results used to seed players for a medal round.

== Group stage ==
=== Pool A ===
Player	Pld	W	L	GF	GA	PF	PA	Points
(United States) David Horn	2	2	0	4	0	60	23	4
(Dominican Republic) Luis Pérez	2	1	1	2	2	42	45	3
(South Korea) Moon Gyun Kim	2	0	2	0	4	26	60	2

=== Pool B ===
Player	Pld	W	L	GF	GA	PF	PA	Points
(Mexico) Daniel De La Rosa	2	2	0	4	0	60	17	4
(Dominican Republic) Ramón de León	2	1	1	2	3	43	61	3
(South Korea) Daeyong Kwon	2	0	2	1	4	41	66	2

=== Pool C ===
Player	Pld	W	L	GF	GA	PF	PA	Points
(United States) Charles Pratt	3	3	0	6	0	90	40	6
(Costa Rica) Felipe Camacho	3	2	1	4	2	74	55	5
(Venezuela) Luis Felipe Zea	3	1	2	2	4	53	70	4
(Republic of Ireland) Jonny O’keeney	3	0	3	0	6	38	90	3

=== Pool D ===
Player	Pld	W	L	GF	GA	PF	PA	Points
(Mexico) Rodrigo Montoya	3	3	0	6	0	90	25	6
(Argentina) Fernando Kurzbard	3	2	1	4	2	71	46	5
(Japan) Ryoki Kamahara	3	1	2	2	4	44	62	4
(Switzerland) Alberto Rojas	3	0	3	0	6	18	90	3

=== Pool E ===
Player	Pld	W	L	GF	GA	PF	PA	Points
(Bolivia) Conrrado Moscoso	3	3	0	6	0	90	33	6
(Costa Rica) Andrés Acuña	3	2	1	4	2	70	43	5
(Venezuela) Ricardo Gómez	3	1	2	2	5	54	92	4
(Republic of Ireland) Mark Murphy	3	0	3	1	6	54	97	3

=== Pool F ===
Player	Pld	W	L	GF	GA	PF	PA	Points
(Canada) Samuel Murray	3	3	0	6	0	90	31	6
(Argentina) Shai Manzuri	3	2	1	4	2	70	62	5
(Japan) Kono Michimune	3	1	2	2	4	68	71	4
(India) Alok Mehta	3	0	3	0	6	26	90	3

=== Pool G ===
Player	Pld	W	L	GF	GA	PF	PA	Points
(Bolivia) Carlos Keller	3	3	0	6	1	90	52	6
(Guatemala) Edwin Galicia	3	2	1	4	2	73	34	5
(Ecuador) Christian Chavez	3	1	2	2	4	46	66	4
(Chile) Johan Igor	3	0	3	1	6	50	90	3

=== Pool H ===
Player	Pld	W	L	GF	GA	PF	PA	Points
(Colombia) Mario Mercado	3	3	0	6	1	97	43	6
(Canada) Coby Iwaasa	3	2	1	5	2	95	59	5
(Puerto Rico) Aaron Booker	3	1	2	2	4	48	61	4
(India) Yash Doshi	3	0	3	0	6	13	90	3

=== Pool I ===
Player	Pld	W	L	GF	GA	PF	PA	Points
(Colombia) Sebastian Franco	3	3	0	6	0	90	50	6
(Ecuador) José Daniel Ugalde	3	2	1	5	3	88	72	5
(Chile) Francisco Troncoso	3	1	2	2	4	53	74	4
(Guatemala) Christian Wer	3	0	3	1	6	64	99	3

== Medal round ==
First round
33	(Switzerland) Alberto Rojas	8, 2
32	(Republic of Ireland) Mark Murphy	15, 15
41
24
25
40
37
28
21
44
45
20
29
36
35
30
43
22
27
38
39
26
23
42
31	(India) Alok Mehta	8, 15, 9
34	(Republic of Ireland) Johnny O’keeney	15, 12, 11

Second round
1	(United States) David Horn	15, 15
(Republic of Ireland) Mark Murphy	3, 1
17	(Argentina) Shai Manzuri	7, 12
16	(Guatemala) Edwin Galicia	15, 15
9	(Canada) Coby Iwaasa	15, 15
24	(South Korea) Daeyong Kwon	11, 2
25	(Venezuela) Luis Felipe Zea	1, 4
8	(Colombia) Mario Mercado	15, 15
5	(Bolivia) Conrrado Moscoso	15, 15
28	(Guatemala) Christian Wer	1, 4
21	(Ecuador) Christian Chavez	4, 12
12	(Costa Rica) Felipe Camacho	15, 15
13	(Dominican Republic) Ramón de León	15, 15
20	(Japan) Kono Michimune	10, 9
29	(India) Yash Doshi	0, 2
4	(Mexico) Rodrigo Montoya
3	(United States) Charles Pratt	15, 15
30	(Chile) Johan Igor	5, 3
19	(Venezuela) Ricardo Gómez	8, 5
14	(Argentina) Fernando Kurzbard	15, 15
11	(Ecuador) Jose Daniel Ugalde	15, 15
22	(South Korea) Moon Gyun Kim	9, 4
27	(Puerto Rico) Aaron Booker	0, 8
6	(Canada) Samuel Murray	15, 15
7	(Bolivia) Carlos Keller	15, 15
26	(Chile) Francisco Troncoso	8, 1
23	(Japan) Ryoki Kamahara	7, 4
10	(Colombia) Sebastian Franco	15, 15
15	(Dominican Republic) Luis Pérez	3, 3
18	(Costa Rica) Andrés Acuña	15, 15
(Republic of Ireland) Johnny O'keeney	0, 0
2	(Mexico) Daniel De La Rosa	15, 15

Third round
1	(United States) David Horn	15, 15
16	(Guatemala) Edwin Galicia	14, 3
9	(Canada) Coby Iwaasa	13, 15, 9
8	(Colombia) Mario Mercado	15, 10, 11
5	(Bolivia) Conrrado Moscoso	15, 15
12	(Costa Rica) Felipe Camacho	1, 6
13	(Dominican Republic) Ramon de León	1, 1
4	(Mexico) Rodrigo Montoya	15, 15
3	(United States) Charles Pratt
14	(Argentina) Fernando Kurzbard	forfeit
11	(Ecuador) José Daniel Ugalde	10, 3
6	(Canada) Samuel Murray	15, 15
7	(Bolivia) Carlos Keller	14, 13
10	(Colombia) Sebastian Franco	15, 15
18	(Costa Rica) Andrés Acuña	9, 12
2	(Mexico) Daniel De La Rosa	15, 15

Quarterfinals
1	(United States) David Horn	15, 15
8	(Colombia) Mario Mercado	12, 6
5	(Bolivia) Conrrado Moscoso	15, 7, 6
4	(Mexico) Rodrigo Montoya	13, 15, 11
3	(United States) Charles Pratt	15, 15
6	(Canada) Samuel Murray	2, 12
10	(Colombia) Sebastian Franco	15, 5, 11
2	(Mexico) Daniel De La Rosa	8, 15, 10

Semifinals
1	(United States) David Horn	9, 8
4	(Mexico) Rodrigo Montoya	15, 15
3	(United States) Charles Pratt	15, 15
10	(Colombia) Sebastian Franco	8, 13

Final
4	(Mexico) Rodrigo Montoya	15, 15
3	(United States) Charles Pratt	14, 9

Winner
(Mexico) Rodrigo Montoya
