= 2014 Racquetball World Championships =

17th Racquetball World Championships held in Burlington, Ontario, Canada in 2014

- XVII Racquetball World Championships: Canada 2014 -
Host	Burlington, Ontario; Canada
Dates	June 14–21
- Men's singles
Gold	(United States) Rocky Carson
Silver	(Bolivia) Conrrado Moscoso
Bronze	(United States) Jose Rojas (Bolivia) Carlos Keller
- Women's singles
Gold	(Mexico) Paola Longoria
Silver	(United States) Rhonda Rajsich
Bronze	(Argentina) María José Vargas (Mexico) Samantha Salas
- Men's doubles
Gold	(Colombia) Sebastian Franco & Alejandro Herrera
Silver	(Canada) Mike Green & Vincent Gagnon
Bronze	(Bolivia) Conrrado Moscoso & Mario Mercado (United States) Ben Croft & Tom Fuhrmann
- Women's doubles
Gold	(Mexico) Paola Longoria & Samantha Salas
Silver	(United States) Aimee Ruiz & Janel Tisinger
Bronze	(Chile) Angela Grisar & Carla Muñoz (Ecuador) Veronica Sotomayor & Maria Paz Muñoz

The International Racquetball Federation's 17th Racquetball World Championships were held in Burlington, Ontario, Canada from June 14 to 21, 2014. This was the second time that Worlds were held in Canada. Previously, they were in Montreal in 1992.

American Rocky Carson and Mexican Paola Longoria were the incumbent champions in men's and women's singles, respectively, and both successfully defended their titles.

Longoria was also the incumbent champion in women's doubles with Samantha Salas, and they successfully defended their title. Fellow Mexicans Álvaro Beltrán and Javier Moreno were the defending champions in men's doubles, but Mexico did not make the podium in Burlington.

Instead, Colombians Sebastian Franco and Alejandro Herrera defeated Canadians Mike Green and Vincent Gagnon in the final, which was the first men's doubles World Championship not won by either the USA or Mexico.

== Tournament format ==
The 2014 World Championships was the first competition with an initial round robin stage that was used to seed players for an elimination qualification round. Previously, players were seeded into an elimination round based on how their countries had done at previous World Championships, and then a second team competition was also played. This year there was no team competition. Team standings were based on points earned from the singles and doubles competitions.

== Events ==
=== Men's singles ===
Semi-finals
(United States) Rocky Carson	15, 15
(United States) Jose Rojas	8, 12
(Bolivia) Conrrado Moscoso	15, 11, 11
(Bolivia) Carlos Keller	11, 15, 3

Final
(United States) Rocky Carson	15, 15
(Bolivia) Conrrado Moscoso	3, 8

=== Women's singles ===
Semi-finals
(United States) Rhonda Rajsich	15, 15
(Mexico) Samantha Salas	11, 9
(Argentina) María José Vargas	5, 9
(Mexico) Paola Longoria	15, 15

Final
(United States) Rhonda Rajsich	6, 8
(Mexico) Paola Longoria	15, 15

=== Men's doubles ===
Semi-finals
(United States) Ben Croft & Tom Fuhrmann	11, 2
(Canada) Mike Green & Vincent Gagnon	15, 15
(Bolivia) Conrrado Moscoso & Mario Mercado	11, 2
(Colombia) Sebastian Franco & Alejandro Herrera	15, 15

Final
(Canada) Mike Green & Vincent Gagnon	11, 5
(Colombia) Sebastian Franco & Alejandro Herrera	15, 15

=== Women's doubles ===
Semi-finals
(Mexico) Paola Longoria & Samantha Salas	15, 15
(Chile) Angela Grisar & Carla Muñoz	1, 3
(Ecuador) Veronica Sotomayor & Maria Paz Muñoz	15, 4, 4
(United States) Aimee Ruiz & Janel Tisinger	6, 15, 11

Final
(Mexico) Paola Longoria & Samantha Salas	15, 15
(United States) Aimee Ruiz & Janel Tisinger	4, 12

== Medal table ==
Rank	Nation	Gold	Silver	Bronze	Total
1	Mexico (MEX)	2	0	1	3
2	United States (USA)	1	2	2	5
3	Colombia (COL)	1	0	0	1
4	Bolivia (BOL)	0	1	2	3
5	Canada (CAN)	0	1	0	1
6	Argentina (ARG)	0	0	1	1
6	Chile (CHI)	0	0	1	1
6	Ecuador (ECU)	0	0	1	1
Totals (8 entries)		4	4	8	16

== Team results ==
Final team standings
	Men's team	Women's team	Overall/combined
1	(United States) USA	Mexico	(United States) USA
2	Bolivia	USA	Mexico
3	Colombia	Ecuador	Bolivia
4	Canada	Argentina	Canada
5	Mexico	Canada	Colombia
6	Ecuador	Chile	Ecuador
7	Japan	Bolivia	Argentina
8	Costa Rica	South Korea	South Korea
9	Venezuela	Colombia	Japan
10	Argentina	Japan	Chile
11	South Korea	Venezuela	Venezuela
12	Dominican Republic	Guatemala	Costa Rica
13	Catalunya	Costa Rica	Dominican Republic
14	Chile	(Republic of Ireland) Ireland	Guatemala
15	(Republic of Ireland) Ireland	Dominican Republic	(Republic of Ireland) Ireland
16	Dominican Republic & | Cuba	Catalunya	Catalunya
17	–	Cuba	Cuba
18	Guatemala	-	Puerto Rico
19	India	-	India
20	Poland	-	Poland
20	Ukraine	-	Ukraine
