= 2018 Racquetball World Championships – Men's doubles =

- XIX Racquetball World Championships: Costa Rica 2018 -
Host	San José, Costa Rica
Dates	August 10–18
- Men's singles
- Women's singles
- Men's doubles
Gold	(Mexico) Álvaro Beltrán & Daniel de la Rosa
Silver	(United States) Rocky Carson & Sudsy Monchik
Bronze	(Bolivia) Roland Keller & Conrrado Moscoso (Canada) Tim Landeryou & Samuel Murray
- Women's doubles

The International Racquetball Federation's 19th Racquetball World Championships are being held in San José, Costa Rica from August 10–18. This is the first time Worlds have been Costa Rica, and the first time a Central American country has hosted the event.

In 2016, Mexicans Álvaro Beltrán and Javier Moreno won the men's doubles World Championship for the third time as a team, when the defeated Americans Jake Bredenbeck and Jose Diaz in the final, 15–12, 15–9. Previously, the Mexicans had won in 2006 and 2012. Moreno also won the title in 2000 with Luis Bustilos. The Mexicans defeated the 2012 World Champions, Sebastian Franco and Alejandro Herrera of Colombia, in the semi-finals.

== Tournament format ==
The 2018 World Championships used a two-stage format with an initial group stage that was a round robin with the results used to seed players for a medal round.

== Group stage ==
=== Pool A ===
Players	Pld	W	L	GF	GA	PF	PA	Points
(Mexico) Álvaro Beltrán & Daniel de la Rosa	3	3	0	6	0	90	28	6
(Guatemala) Edwin Galicia & Christian Wer	3	2	1	4	3	83	76	5
(Japan) Yuki Nakano & Hiroshi Shimizu	3	1	2	4	2	70	74	4
(India) Alok Mehta & Thirumurugan Thiyagarajan	3	0	3	0	6	25	90	3

=== Pool B ===
Players	Pld	W	L	GF	GA	PF	PA	Points
(Argentina) Fernando Kurzbard & Shai Manzuri	3	3	0	6	1	96	45	6
(Costa Rica) Gabriel García & Alexander Pirie	3	2	1	2	4	58	82	5
(Colombia) Sebastian Franco & Mario Mercado	3	1	2	4	2	86	55	4
(Chile) Rodrigo Salgado & Francisco Troncoso	3	0	3	1	6	41	99	3

- Note – Costa Rica defeated Colombia by injury forfeit after Colombia had won game one.

=== Pool C ===
Players	Pld	W	L	GF	GA	PF	PA	Points
(United States) Rocky Carson & Sudsy Monchik	3	3	0	6	0	90	26	6
(Ecuador) Juan Francisco Cueva & Jose Daniel Ugalde	3	2	1	4	3	76	61	5
(Venezuela) Ricardo Gomez & Luis Felipe Zea	3	1	2	3	4	58	47	4
(Republic of Ireland) Ken Cottrell & Eoin Tynan	3	0	3	0	6	23	90	3

=== Pool D ===
Players	Pld	W	L	GF	GA	PF	PA	Points
(Bolivia) Roland Keller & Conrrado Moscoso	3	3	0	6	1	93	57	6
(Canada) Samuel Murray & Tim Landeryou	3	2	1	5	2	89	60	5
(Dominican Republic) Luis Pérez & Ramón de León	3	1	2	2	4	68	79	4
(South Korea) Moon Gyun Kim & Daeyong Kwon	3	0	3	0	6	36	90	3

== Medal round ==
Round of 16
1	(Mexico) Álvaro Beltrán & Daniel de la Rosa	15, 15
16	(Chile) Rodrigo Salgado & Francisco Troncoso	8, 8
9	(Dominican Republic) Ramon de León & Luis Pérez	15, 15
8	(Ecuador) Juan Francisco Cueva & José Daniel Ugalde	9, 11
5	(Costa Rica) Gabriel García & Alexander Pirie	11, 15, 9
12	(Japan) Yuki Nakano & Hiroshi Shimizu	15, 12, 11
13	(Republic of Ireland) Ken Cottrell & Eoin Tynan	5, 13
4	(Bolivia) Roland Keller & Conrrado Moscoso	15, 15
3	(United States) Rocky Carson & Sudsy Monchik	15, 14, 11
14	(South Korea) Daeyong Kwon & Moon Gyun Kim	4, 15, 3
11	(Colombia) Sebastian Franco & Mario Mercado	15, 15
6	(Guatemala) Edwin Galicia & Christian Wer	12, 5
7	(Canada) Tim Landeryou & Samuel Murray	15, 15
10	(Venezuela) Ricardo Gomez & Luis Felipe Zea	9, 6
15	(India) Alok Mehta & Thirumurugan Thyagarajan	1, 7
2	(Argentina) Fernando Kurzbard & Shai Manzuri	15, 15

Quarter finals
1	Mexico	15, 15
9	Dominican Republic	11, 11
12	Japan	4, 8
4	Bolivia	15, 15
3	(United States) USA	15, 15
11	Colombia	11, 13
7	Canada	15, 15
2	Argentina	3, 9

Semi finals
1	Mexico	15, 15
4	Bolivia	14, 8
3	(United States) USA	15, 15
7	Canada	12, 2

Finals
1	Mexico	10, 15, 11
3	USA	15, 9, 2

Winners
(Mexico) Álvaro Beltrán & Daniel de la Rosa
