= 2016 Racquetball World Championships – Women's singles =

- XVIII Racquetball World Championships: Colombia 2016 -
Host	Cali, Colombia
Dates	July 15–23
- Men's singles
- Women's singles
Gold	(Mexico) Paola Longoria
Silver	(Guatemala) Ana Gabriela Martinez
Bronze	(Argentina) Maria Jose Vargas (Mexico) Samantha Salas
- Men's doubles
- Women's doubles

The International Racquetball Federation's 18th Racquetball World Championships were held in Cali, Colombia, from July 15 to 23, 2016. This was the first time Worlds were in Colombia, and the first time a South American country hosted the event since 1998, when Cochabamba, Bolivia, was the host city.

Mexican Paola Longoria won her third World Championship in women's singles, which ties her with Cheryl Gudinas and Michelle Gould for most World Championships in women's singles. Ana Gabriela Martinez of Guatemala was Longoria's opponent in the final, and she was a surprise finalist, as she was only 16 years old, although she was the World Junior Champion in girl's U16. Also, neither American player – Michelle Key nor Rhonda Rajsich – made the podium, which was the first time a USA woman had not finished in the top three in World Championship history.

== Tournament format ==
The 2016 World Championships used a two-stage format with an initial group stage that was a round robin with the results used to seed players for a medal round.

== Round robin ==
=== Pool A ===
Player	Pld	W	L	GF	GA	PF	PA	Points
(Mexico) Paola Longoria	2	2	0	4	0	60	13	4
(Guatemala) Ana Gabriela Martinez	2	1	1	2	2	35	43	3
(Venezuela) Mariana Tobon	2	0	2	0	4	21	60	2

=== Pool B ===
Player	Pld	W	L	GF	GA	PF	PA	Points
(United States) Rhonda Rajsich	2	2	0	4	2	77	60	4
(Bolivia) Jenny Daza	2	1	1	3	3	57	71	3
(Guatemala) Maria Renee Rodriguez	2	0	2	2	4	66	69	2

=== Pool C ===
Player	Pld	W	L	GF	GA	PF	PA	Points
(Mexico) Samantha Salas	2	2	0	4	0	60	21	4
(Chile) Carla Muñoz	2	1	1	2	2	42	28	3
(Venezuela) Mariana Paredes	2	0	2	0	4	17	60	2

=== Pool D ===
Player	Pld	W	L	GF	GA	PF	PA	Points
(Bolivia) Adriana Riveros	3	3	0	6	1	87	37	6
(United States) Michelle Key	3	2	1	5	2	85	36	5
(Honduras) Pamela Sierra	3	1	2	2	4	37	72	4
(Costa Rica) Naomi Sasso Kessler	3	0	3	0	6	17	90	3

=== Pool E ===
Player	Pld	W	L	GF	GA	PF	PA	Points
(Argentina) Maria Jose Vargas	3	3	0	6	0	90	34	6
(Canada) Michéle Morissette	3	2	1	4	2	70	72	5
(Ecuador) Ivonne Carpio	3	1	2	2	4	65	69	4
(Republic of Ireland) Majella Haverty	3	0	3	0	6	39	90	3

=== Pool F ===
Player	Pld	W	L	GF	GA	PF	PA	Points
(Colombia) Cristina Amaya	3	3	0	6	1	100	57	6
(South Korea) Jin Young Seok	3	2	1	5	2			5
(Dominican Republic) Merynanyelly Delgado Araujo	3	1	2	2	4	44	79	4
(Japan) Harumi Kajino	3	0	0	0	6	53	90	3

=== Pool G ===
Player	Pld	W	L	GF	GA	PF	PA	Points
(Ecuador) Veronica Sotomayor	3	3	0	6	0	90	19	6
(Canada) Christine Richardson	3	2	1	4	2	66	54	5
(Argentina) Cecilia Cerquetti	3	1	2	2	5	64	93	4
(Republic of Ireland) Donna Ryder	3	0	3	1	6	44	98	3

=== Pool H ===
Player	Pld	W	L	GF	GA	PF	PA	Points
(Dominican Republic) Merynanyelly Delgado	3	3	0	6	2	105	101	6
(Japan) Maiko Sato	3	2	1	4	3	90	77	5
(South Korea) Jung Eun Ane	3	1	2	3	5	100	97	4
(Colombia) Carolina Gomez	3	0	3	3	6	116	96	3

== Medal round ==
Round of 32
1	(Mexico) Paola Longoria
32
17	(Venezuela) Mariana Paredes	7, 12
16	(Bolivia) Jenny Daza	15, 15
9	(Canada) Christine Richardson	15, 5, 11
24	(Dominican Republic) Merynanyelly Delgado	7, 15, 7
25	(Republic of Ireland) Majella Haventry	4, 3
8	(Dominican Republic) Maria Cespedes	15, 15
5	(Argentina) Maria Jose Vargas	15, 15
28	(Colombia) Carolina Gomez	4, 4
21	(Argentina) Pia Dati	3, 1
12	(South Korea) Jin Seok	15, 15
13	(Chile) Carla Muñoz	15, 15
20	(Guatemala) María Renee Rodríguez	8, 7
29	(Costa Rica) Naomi Sasso Kessler	3, 1
4	(Bolivia) Adriana Riveros	15, 15
3	(Mexico) Samantha Salas
30
19	(Venezuela) Mariana Tobon	4, 15, 11
14	(United States) Michelle Key	15, 9, 4
11	(Canada) Michèle Morissette	15, 15
22	(South Korea) June Eun Ane	7, 14
27	(Republic of Ireland) Donna Ryder	6, 7
6	(Colombia) Cristina Amaya	15, 15
7	(Ecuador) Veronica Sotomayor	15, 15
26	(Japan) Harumi Kajino	7, 6
23	(Ecuador) Ivonne Carpio	10, 9
10	(Japan) Maiko Sato	15, 15
15	(Guatemala) Ana Gabriela Martinez	15, 15
18	(Honduras) Pamela Sierra	6, 6
31
2	(United States) Rhonda Rajsich

Round of 16
1	(Mexico) Paola Longoria	15, 15
16	(Bolivia) Jenny Daza	5, 2
9	(Canada) Christine Richardson	10, 15, 11
8	(Dominican Republic) María Céspedes	15, 9, 10
5	(Argentina) Maria Jose Vargas	9, 15, 11
12	(South Korea) Jin Seok	15, 7, 4
13	(Chile) Carla Muñoz	15, 15
4	(Bolivia) Adriana Riveros	10, 11
3	(Mexico) Samantha Salas	15, 15
19	(Venezuela) Mariana Tobon	3, 0
11	(Canada) Michèle Morissette	1, 0
6	(Colombia) Cristina Amaya	15, 15
10	(Japan) Maiko Sato	6, 3
7	(Ecuador) Veronica Sotomayor	15, 15
15	(Guatemala) Ana Gabriela Martinez	15, 14, 11
2	(United States) Rhonda Rajsich	14, 15, 7

Quarterfinals
1	(Mexico) Paola Longoria	15, 15
9	(Canada) Christine Richardson	1, 0
5	(Argentina) Maria Jose Vargas	15, 6, 11
13	(Chile) Carla Muñoz	9, 15, 9
3	(Mexico) Samantha Salas	15, 6, 11
6	(Colombia) Cristina Amaya	3, 15, 6
7	(Ecuador) Veronica Sotomayor	9, 9
15	(Guatemala) Ana Gabriela Martinez	15, 15

Semi finals
1	(Mexico) Paola Longoria	15, 15
5	(Argentina) Maria Jose Vargas	5, 5
3	(Mexico) Samantha Salas	11, 15, 9
15	(Guatemala) Ana Gabriela Martinez	15, 14, 11

Finals
1	(Mexico) Paola Longoria	15, 15
15	(Guatemala) Ana Gabriela Martinez	12, 5

Women's singles Winner
(Mexico) Paola Longoria
