= Janel Tisinger =

American racquetball player

Personal information
- Nationality: American
- Born: March 13, 1983 (age 43)

Sport
- Sport: Racquetball

Achievements and titles
- World finals: 1st 2016 (doubles)
- National finals: 1st 2013, 2014, 2016, 2017, 2019 (doubles)
Medal record
Women's Racquetball
Representing United States
World Championships
Silver medal – second place	2014 Burlington	Doubles
Gold medal – first place	2016 Cali	Doubles
Pan Am Championships
Gold medal – first place	2007 Santiago	Doubles

Janel Tisinger (born March 13, 1983) is an American racquetball player. She is the current USA Racquetball National Champion in Women's Doubles winning the title for a 5th time in 2019 with Aimee Ruiz. Tisinger is former World Champion in Women's Doubles, with Ruiz, winning the title in 2016.

== International career ==
Tisinger has competed for the USA five times. Her first appearance on Team USA was in 2007, when she played Women's Doubles with Rhonda Rajsich at the Pan American Championships in Santiago, Chile, where they won gold.

She didn't play on the team again until 2014, when Tisinger played Women's Singles and Doubles at the Pan American Championships in Santa Cruz, Bolivia. There she lost to Susana Acosta of Mexico in the Round of Singles of Women's Singles, 13-15, 15-7, 11-4. In doubles, Tisinger was again paired with Rajsich, but they lost in the quarterfinals to Veronica Sotomayor and Maria Paz Muñoz of Ecuador, 15-8, 7-15, 11-6.

Her next two international appearances were in Women's Doubles with Aimee Ruiz at the 2014 and 2016 World Championships. In 2014, they lost in the final to Mexicans Paola Longoria and Samantha Salas, 15-4, 15-12. But in a rematch of that final, in 2016 Tisinger and Ruiz came out on top, beating the Mexicans, 15-11, 9-15, 11-8.

Tisinger was also on Team USA for the 2018 Pan American Championships in Temuco, Chile, where she competed in both Women's Singles and Women's Doubles with Rhonda Rajsich. In Temuco, Tisinger lost to Paola Longoria in the Round of 16, 15-5, 15-5 in Women's Singles, and in Women's Doubles, she and Rajsich lost to Chileans Carla Muñoz and Josefa Parada, 15-14, 15-2, in the quarterfinals.

== US Championships ==
Tisinger has won five USA National Championships in Women's Doubles, all with Aimee Ruiz as her partner. They first won in 2013, when they defeated sisters Danielle and Michelle Key in the final, 15-6, 15-8. They followed that up in 2014 by defeating Rhonda Rajsich and Kim Russell-Waselenchuk, 15-9, 15-10, in the final. Tisinger and Ruiz won for a third time in 2016, when they narrowly defeated Rajsich and Sheryl Lotts in the final, 15-12, 12-15, 11-10, which qualified them to appear at the 2016 World Championships.

Tisinger and Ruiz won National Doubles for a 4th time in 2017 by defeating Da'monique Davis and Jackie Paraiso in the final, 15-5, 15-5. They won for a 5th time in 2019, when they beat Michelle De La Rosa and Danielle Maddux in the final, 15-7, 15-7. The win qualifies Tisinger and Ruiz to play on Team USA at the 2019 Pan American Games in Lima, Peru.

Tisinger has also been runner up in Women's Doubles at the USA Racquetball National Doubles Championships three times. In 2015, she and Ruiz lost the final to Rajsich and Russell-Waselenchuk, 1-15, 15-10, 11-9. Her other runner up placings were in 2009 and 2010, when she and Rajsich played together. In both years, they lost to Ruiz and Jackie Paraiso.

For the 2012 championships, Tisinger teamed up with Kristen Bellows, and they lost to Rajsich and Russell-Waselenchuk, 15-9, 15-4, in the quarterfinals.

== Professional career ==
Tisinger hasn't played professional racquetball very much, so she's never been ranked in the top 10 of the Ladies Professional Racquetball Tour. Perhaps her best pro results are two quarterfinal finishes at the US Open Racquetball Championships in 2009 and 2013.

== Personal life ==
Tisinger is the daughter of Debbie Tisinger-Moore, who is a noted racquetball player in her own right and a member of the USA Racquetball Hall of Fame. Tisinger-Moore was also an assistant coach on Team USA for the 2016 World Championships, when daughter Janel won gold.

== See also ==
- List of racquetball players
