= 2016 Racquetball World Championships – Men's singles =

- XVIII Racquetball World Championships: Colombia 2016 -
Host	Cali, Colombia
Dates	July 15–23
- Men's singles
Gold	(United States) Rocky Carson
Silver	(Mexico) Daniel De La Rosa
Bronze	(Bolivia) Conrrado Moscoso (Canada) Samuel Murray
- Women's singles
- Men's doubles
- Women's doubles

The International Racquetball Federation's 18th Racquetball World Championships were held in Cali, Colombia, from July 15 to 23, 2016. This was the first time Worlds were in Colombia, and the first time a South American country hosted the event since 1998, when Cochabamba, Bolivia, was the host city.

American Rocky Carson won gold for the fifth consecutive time, extending his career record, when he defeated Mexican Daniel De La Rosa, in the final, 15–11, 5–15, 11–5. But it was the first time that Carson needed a tie-breaker to win the final, and he also needed three games to advance to the final, as Bolivian Conrrado Moscoso took him to a tie-breaker in the semi-finals.

== Tournament format ==
The 2016 World Championships used a two stage format with an initial group stage that was a round robin with the results used to seed players for a medal round.

== Round robin ==
=== Pool A ===
Player	Pld	W	L	GF	GA	PF	PA	Points
(United States) Rocky Carson	2	2	0	4	0	60	28	4
(Dominican Republic) Luis Pérez	2	1	1	2	2	46	36	3
(Ecuador) Jose Daniel Ugalde	2	0	2	0	4	18	60	2

=== Pool B ===
Player	Pld	W	L	GF	GA	PF	PA	Points
(Costa Rica) Andres Acuña	3	3	0	6	0	90	32	6
(Colombia) Alejandro Herrera	3	2	1	4	2	79	47	5
(Dominican Republic) Ramón de León	3	1	2	2	4	48	66	4
(Indonesia) Djoko Boentaran	3	0	3	0	6	20	90	3

=== Pool C ===
Player	Pld	W	L	GF	GA	PF	PA	Points
(United States) Chris Crowther	3	3	1	6	0	90	29	6
(Venezuela) Cesar Castillo	3	2	0	4	2	71	53	5
(Argentina) Franco Capandegui	3	1	2	2	4	52	60	4
(England) Timothy Baghurst	3	0	3	0	6	19	90	2

=== Pool D ===
Player	Pld	W	L	GF	GA	PF	PA	Points
(Ecuador) Fernando Rios	3	3	0	6	0	90	28	6
(Colombia) Set Cubillos	3	2	1	4	2	75	63	5
(South Korea) Im Ji Soo	3	1	2	2	4	58	80	4
(Honduras) Sergio Ortega	3	0	3	0	6	38	90	3

=== Pool E ===
Player	Pld	W	L	GF	GA	PF	PA	Points
(Bolivia) Conrrado Moscoso	3	3	0	6	0	90	23	6
(Argentina) Fernando Kurzbard	3	2	1	4	2	67	47	5
(Venezuela) Alejandro Santos	3	1	2	2	4	54	64	4
(Puerto Rico) John Maisonet	3	0	3	0	6	13	90	3

=== Pool F ===
Player	Pld	W	L	GF	GA	PF	PA	Points
(Canada) Samuel Murray	3	3	0	6	1	99	53	6
(Ecuador) José Daniel Ugalde	3	2	1	4	4	83	81	5
(South Korea) Daeyong Kwon	3	1	2	3	5	80	94	5
(Honduras) Raúl Banegas	3	0	3	3	6	76	110	0

=== Pool G ===
Player	Pld	W	L	GF	GA	PF	PA	Points
(Bolivia) Roland Keller	3	3	0	6	0	90	24	6
(Japan) Hirotake Usami	3	2	1	4	2	76	46	5
(Puerto Rico) Aaron Booker	3	1	2	2	4	48	74	4
(India) Sriram Ravindran	2	0	3	0	6	20	90	3

=== Pool H ===
Player	Pld	W	L	GF	GA	PF	PA	Points
(Mexico) Javier Mar	3	3	0	6	0	90	28	6
(Canada) Pedro Castro	3	1	2	4	2	67	83	4
(Guatemala) Edwin Galicia	3	1	2	2	4	72	84	4
(Chile) Francisco Troncoso	3	1	2	0	6	74	86	4

=== Pool I ===
Player	Pld	W	L	GF	GA	PF	PA	Points
(Mexico) Daniel De La Rosa	3	3	0	6	0	90	22	6
(Japan) Yuki Nakano	3	2	1	4	2	69	58	5
(Guatemala) Juan José Salvatierra	3	1	2	2	4	56	80	4
(India) Rajiv Varadhrajan	3	0	3	0	6	35	90	3

== Medal round ==
First round
33	(India) Sriram Ravindran
32	(Indonesia) Djoko Boentaran
41
24
25
40
37
28
21
44
45
20
29
36
35	(England) Timothy Baghurst
30	(Honduras) Sergio Ortega
43
22
27
38
39
26
23
42
31	(India) Rajiv Varadhrajan
34	(Puerto Rico) John Maisonet

Second round
1	(United States) Rocky Carson	15, 15
33	(India) Sriram Ravindran	2, 3
17	(Colombia) Alejandro Herrera	15, 4, 11
16	(Venezuela) Cesar Castillo	13, 15, 5
9	(Japan) Yuki Nakano	15, 15
24	(South Korea) Daeyong Kwon	12, 9
25	(Puerto Rico) Aaron Booker	8, 9
8	(Mexico) Javier Mar	15, 15
5	(Bolivia) Conrrado Moscoso	15, 15
37	(Chile) Francisco Troncoso	8, 5
21	(Argentina) Franco Capandegui	4, 9
12	(Japan) Hirotake Usami	15, 15
13	(Ecuador) Jose Daniel Ugalde	15, 15
20	(Dominican Republic) Ramón de León	10, 12
29	(Honduras) Raul Banegas	10, 2
4	(Ecuador) Fernando Rios	15, 15
3	(United States) Chris Crowther	15, 15
35	(England) Timothy Baghurst	5, 7
19	(Costa Rica) Jose Ubilla	15, 6, 7
14	(Argentina) Fernando Kurzbard	5, 15, 11
11	(Guatemala) Edwin Galicia	14, 15, 11
22	(South Korea) Im Ji Soo	15, 9, 9
27	(India) Juan José Salvatierra	2, 8
6	(Canada) Samuel Murray	15, 15
7	(Bolivia) Roland Keller	15, 9, 11
26	(Canada) Pedro Castro	10, 15, 3
23	(Venezuela) Alejandro Santos	0, 2
10	(Mexico) Daniel De La Rosa	15, 15
15	(Colombia) Set Cubillos	7, 11
18	(Dominican Republic) Luis Pérez	15, 15
(India) Rajiv Varadhrajan	0, 3
2	(Costa Rica) Andres Acuña	15, 15

Third round
1	(United States) Rocky Carson	15, 15
17	(Colombia) Alejandro Herrera	12, 2
9	(Japan) Yuki Nakano	5, 6
8	(Mexico) Javier Mar	15, 15
5	(Bolivia) Conrrado Moscoso	15, 15
12	(Japan) Hirotake Usami	5, 9
13	(Ecuador) José Daniel Ugalde	11, 5
4	(Ecuador) Fernando Rios	15, 15
3	(United States) Chris Crowther	15, 15
14	(Argentina) Fernando Kurzbard	8, 8
11	(Guatemala) Edwin Galicia	11, 15, 1
6	(Canada) Samuel Murray	15, 13, 11
7	(Bolivia) Roland Keller	10, 0
10	(Mexico) Daniel De La Rosa	15, 15
18	(Dominican Republic) Luis Pérez	15, 10, 11
2	(Costa Rica) Andres Acuña	10, 15, 7

Quarterfinals
1	(United States) Rocky Carson	15, 15
8	(Mexico) Javier Mar	9, 9
5	(Bolivia) Conrrado Moscoso	11, 15, 11
4	(Ecuador) Fernando Rios	15, 0, 1
3	(United States) Chris Crowther	15, 3, 7
6	(Canada) Samuel Murray	7, 15, 11
10	(Mexico) Daniel De La Rosa	15, 15
18	(Dominican Republic) Luis Pérez	6, 0

Semifinals
1	(United States) Rocky Carson	15, 12, 11
5	(Bolivia) Conrrado Moscoso	12, 15, 4
6	(Canada) Samuel Murray	12, 7
10	(Mexico) Daniel De La Rosa	15, 15

Final
1	(United States) Rocky Carson	15, 5, 11
10	(Mexico) Daniel De La Rosa	11, 15, 5

Winner
(United States) Rocky Carson
