= 2018 Racquetball World Championships – Women's doubles =

- XIX Racquetball World Championships: Costa Rica 2018 -
| Host | San José, Costa Rica |
| Dates | August 10-18 |
- Men's singles
- Women's singles
- Men's doubles
- Women's doubles
| Gold | (Bolivia) Valeria Centellas & Yasmine Sabja |
| Silver | (Mexico) Alexandra Herrera & Montserrat Mejia |
| Bronze | (Guatemala) María Rene Rodríguez & Gabriela Martinez (Colombia) Cristina Amaya & Adriana Riveros |

The International Racquetball Federation's 19th Racquetball World Championships are being held in San José, Costa Rica from August 10 to 18. This is the first time Worlds have been Costa Rica, and the first time a Central American country has hosted the event.

Bolivians Valeria Centellas and Yasmine Sabja won the Women’s Doubles World Championship for the first time in their careers, and their win was the first for South American women at Worlds. They defeated the Mexican team of Alexandra Herrera and Montsserrat Mejia in the final in three games, including fighting off a match point in game two, winning 8–15, 15–14, 11–2. Centellas and Sabja beat the Guatemala team of Maria Rene Rodriguez and Gabriela Martinez in the semi-finals by injury default, as Martinez hurt her left arm in the second game, and while they finished that game, they couldn't complete the match. Herrera and Mejia defeated Colombians Cristina Amaya and Adriana Riveros in the other semi.

== Tournament format ==
The 2018 World Championships was a two-stage competition. There was an initial group stage played as a round robin with the results used to seed teams for the medal round.

== Group stage ==
=== Pool A ===
| Players | Pld | W | L | GF | GA | PF | PA | Points |
|---|---|---|---|---|---|---|---|---|
| (Mexico) Alexandra Herrera & Montserrat Mejia | 2 | 2 | 0 | 4 | 1 | 66 | 28 | 4 |
| (Argentina) Maria Jose Vargas & Natalia Mendez | 2 | 1 | 1 | 2 | 3 | 51 | 52 | 3 |
| (Dominican Republic) Alejandra Jiménez & Merynanyelly Delgado | 2 | 0 | 2 | 0 | 4 | 23 | 60 | 2 |

=== Pool B ===
| Players | Pld | W | L | GF | GA | PF | PA | Points |
|---|---|---|---|---|---|---|---|---|
| (United States) Sheryl Lotts & Rhonda Rajsich | 2 | 2 | 0 | 4 | 1 | 64 | 39 | 4 |
| (South Korea) Jin Young Seok & Mi Ok An | 2 | 1 | 1 | 3 | 2 | 55 | 55 | 3 |
| (Japan) Maiko Sato & Naomi Wakimoto | 2 | 0 | 2 | 0 | 4 | 35 | 60 | 2 |

=== Pool C ===
| Players | Pld | W | L | GF | GA | PF | PA | Points |
|---|---|---|---|---|---|---|---|---|
| (Guatemala) María Rene Rodríguez & Gabriela Martinez | 2 | 2 | 0 | 4 | 0 | 60 | 29 | 4 |
| (Ecuador) Maria Paz Muñoz & Verónica Sotomayor | 2 | 1 | 1 | 2 | 2 | 48 | 40 | 3 |
| (Chile) Carla Muñoz & Josefa Parada | 2 | 0 | 2 | 0 | 4 | 21 | 60 | 2 |

=== Pool D ===
| Players | Pld | W | L | GF | GA | PF | PA | Points |
|---|---|---|---|---|---|---|---|---|
| (Colombia) Cristina Amaya & Adriana Riveros | 3 | 3 | 0 | 6 | 0 | 90 | 39 | 6 |
| (Bolivia) Valeria Centellas & Yasmine Sabja | 3 | 2 | 1 | 4 | 3 | 79 | 76 | 5 |
| (Canada) Frédérique Lambert & Jen Saunders | 3 | 1 | 2 | 3 | 4 | 86 | 79 | 4 |
| (Republic of Ireland) Majella Haverty & Katie Kenny | 3 | 0 | 3 | 0 | 6 | 30 | 90 | 3 |

== Medal round ==
Round of 16
1 | (Mexico) Alexandra Herrera & Montserrat Mejia
BYE
9 | (Canada) Frédérique Lambert & Jen Saunders | 15, 9, 4
8 | (Ecuador) Maria Paz Muñoz & Veronica Sotomayor | 5, 15, 11
5 | (South Korea) Jin Seok & Mi Ok An | 15, 15
12 | (Dominican Republic) Merynanyelly Delgado & Alejandra Jiménez | 14, 11
13 | (Republic of Ireland) Majella Haverty & Katie Kenny | 1, 6
4 | (Colombia) Cristina Amaya & Adriana Riveros | 15, 15
3 | (Guatemala) María Rene Rodríguez & Gabriela Martinez
BYE
11 | (Japan) Maiko Sato & Naomi Wakimoto | 6, 6
6 | (Argentina) Natalia Mendez & Maria Jose Vargas | 15, 15
7 | (Bolivia) Valeria Centellas & Yasmine Sabja | 15, 15
10 | (Chile) Carla Muñoz & Josefa Parada | 8, 6
BYE
2 | (United States) Sheryl Lotts & Rhonda Rajsich

Quarter finals
1 | Mexico | 15, 15
8 | Ecuador | 12, 10
5 | South Korea | 10, 9
4 | Colombia | 15, 15
3 | Guatemala | 15, 15
6 | Argentina | 2, 8
7 | Bolivia | 15, 15
2 | United States | 12, 10

Semi finals
1 | Mexico | 15, 15
4 | Colombia | 8, 4
3 | Guatemala | 15, 7, 4, injury forfeit
7 | Bolivia | 10, 15, 6

Finals
1 | Mexico | 15, 14, 2
7 | Bolivia | 8, 15, 11

Winners
(Bolivia) Valeria Centellas & Yasmine Sabja
