= Brandon Tysinger =

Japanese baseball player (born 1998)

Brandon Brandon Tysinger
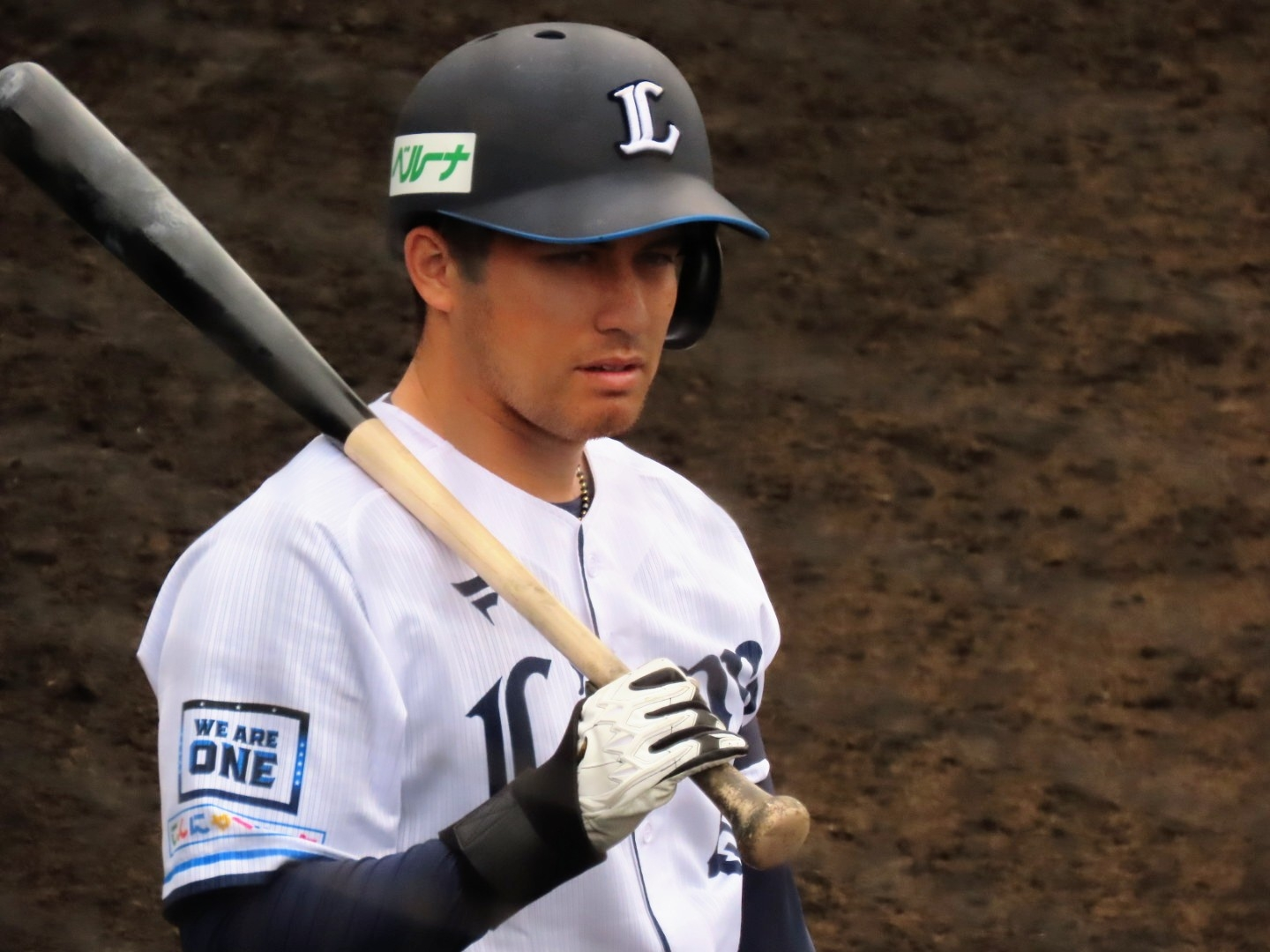
- Brandon with the Saitama Seibu Lions
- Infielder
- Born: June 15, 1998 (age 28); Ishikawa City (currently Uruma City), Okinawa, Japan
- Batted: Right Threw: Right

NPB debut
- March 26, 2021, for the Saitama Seibu Lions

Last NPB appearance
- August 13, 2024, for the Saitama Seibu Lions

NPB statistics
- Batting average: .237
- Hits: 23
- Home runs: 3
- Runs batted in: 8
- Stolen base: 0

Teams
- Saitama Seibu Lions (2021–2024)

Brandon Taiga Tysinger (タイシンガー ブランドン 大河; born June 15, 1998) also known as Brandon (ブランドン) is a professional Japanese baseball player. He plays infielder for the Saitama Seibu Lions.
