= Debbie Tisinger-Moore =

American professional racquetball player (born 1958)

Debbie Tisinger-Moore (born April 2, 1958) is an American professional racquetball player. She is an inductee to the USA Racquetball Hall of Fame.

== Early years ==
Debbie Tisinger-Moore was born in Phoenix, Arizona, the oldest of seven children. In 1980, she was introduced to racquetball by her father who played handball then switched to racquetball. Tisinger-Moore attended Simi High School.

== Career ==
Tisinger-Moore started competing in racquetball during the 1980s. During her career she was named Peggy Steding Athlete of the Year six times. She won 25 U.S. Open titles, 23 World Senior titles, 21 U.S. National Doubles titles and 12 U.S. National Singles titles.

By 1995 Tisinger-Moore was the director of Racquetball World at Canoga Park in Los Angeles. There she organized professional and amateur tournaments. She continued to play in the masters events and earned 11 Women's Senior National titles and 12 National Master titles. In 1998 she was named US Racquetball Association Athlete of the Year.

By 2006 Tisinger-Moore was coaching racquetball at Simi Valley. In 2013, she was inducted into the USA Racquetball Hall of Fame.

In 2016 Tisinger-Moore was an assistant coach to her daughter Janel Tisinger, who won the Women's Doubles World Championship with Aimee Ruiz.

== Personal ==
Tisinger-Moore is married to Gary Moore and lives in Simi Valley, California. She is the mother of three. Her daughter Janel is on the USA racquetball Team.

== See also ==
- Official USA Racquetball Player Profile
