= Sebastian Franco =

Colombian racquetball player

Personal information
- Nationality: Colombian
- Born: February 5, 1993 (age 33) Cali, Colombia

Sport
- Country: Colombia
- Sport: Racquetball
- Coached by: Juan Gutierrez, Jeff Leon

Achievements and titles
- Highest world ranking: 6th (2017–18)
Medal record
Representing Colombia
Men's racquetball
World Championships
Gold medal – first place	2014 Burlington	Doubles
Bronze medal – third place	2016 Cali	Doubles
Bronze medal – third place	2018 San José	Singles
Pan American Games
Silver medal – second place	2019 Lima	Team
Pan American Championships
Bronze medal – third place	2013 Cali	Doubles
South American Games
Silver medal – second place	2018 Cochabamba	Doubles
Silver medal – second place	2018 Cochabamba	Team
Bolivarian Games
Gold medal – first place	2017 Santa Marta	Singles
Bronze medal – third place	2013 Trujillo	Doubles
Bronze medal – third place	2013 Trujillo	Mixed team
Bronze medal – third place	2017 Santa Marta	Team

Sebastian Franco (born February 5, 1993) is a Colombian racquetball player. Franco is a former International Racquetball Federation (IRF) World Champion in Men's Doubles, winning the title in 2014 with Alejandro Herrera. In 2018, Franco became the first South American to win a tournament on the International Racquetball Tour (IRT), when he won the March Madness event in San Antonio. He finished the IRT's Top 10 four straight seasons – from 2015–16 to 2018–19 – with a career high ranking of 6th in 2017–18.

== Junior years ==
Franco began playing racquetball as part of an after school program when he was 12. Two years after beginning to play Franco competed at the IRF World Junior Championships in 2007, when he lost in the Round of 16 in Boys 14 and under to Mexican Daniel de la Rosa. In Boys U14 Doubles that year, Franco and Juan Felipe Garzon lost in the quarterfinals to Bolivians Carlos Keller and Jorge Luis Michel, who went on to win the division.

At the 2008 IRF World Junior Championships, Franco again lost to De La Rosa in the Round of 16 in Boys U14. He and Garzon again played doubles, but in Boys U16 Doubles division, where they lost to the USA's Bradley Kirch and Nick Montalbano in the quarterfinals.

In 2009, for the third year, Franco met Daniel de la Rosa in the playoffs at the IRF World Junior Championships. This time in Boys U16 Singles, and once again De La Rosa was the winner in the Round of 16. However, he got on the podium for the first time, as Franco and Garzon upset the Mexican team of Jaime Martell and Salvador Ortiz in the quarterfinals of Boys U16 Doubles. They lost their semi-final match to Bolivians Carlos Keller and Jorge Luis Michel, but were bronze medalists.

Franco played Boys U16 Singles in 2010, when he lost to eventual champion Marco Rojas of the US in the quarterfinals. In Boys U18 Doubles that year, Franco and Garzon lost to Canadians Pedro Castro and Jamie Slamko in the quarterfinals.

In 2011, Franco played Boys U18 Singles, and lost in the Round of 16 to Mexican Jaime Martell. In Boys U18 Doubles, Franco and Garzon lost to Bolivians Carlos Keller and Jorge Luis Michel in the quarterfinals.

In his final year of juniors in 2012, Franco was a bronze medalist Boys U18 Singles, as he defeated Canadian Samuel Murray in the quarterfinals, but lost to the USA's Jose Diaz in the semi-finals. He didn't play doubles that year. That was his first and only podium result in singles at World Juniors.

== 2012 to 2014 – Early career leads to World Championship ==
Franco played in the US Open as a teenager in 2008 and 2009, and he was still a teen when he began to play the International Racquetball Tour in earnest in the 2010–11 season, when he played seven events. But Franco didn't get past the Round of 32 in any of those tournaments. Franco played three or four IRT events in each of the next four seasons, reaching the Round of 16 three times out of fourteen events.

Franco played both Men's Singles and Doubles at the 2012 Pan American Championships in Temuco, Chile, where he reached the Round of 16 in each event. In singles, Franco lost to Daniel de la Rosa of Mexico, 15–8, 15–8, in the quarterfinals, and in doubles, he played doubles with Juan Carlos Torres, and they lost to the Dominican Republic's Luis Perez and Junior Rodriguez in the Round of 16.

In 2012, Franco played at the IRF World Championships for the first time. He and Alejandro Herrera played Men's Doubles for Colombia, and they defeated Panama before losing to Canada in the Round of 16.

Franco played at the Men's Singles and Doubles at the 2013 Pan American Championships in Cali, Colombia. He lost in the first round of singles to the eventual champion Polo Gutierrez of Mexico, 15–6, 15–4. In doubles, Franco and Juan Herrera defeated Venezuelans Cesar Castillo and César Castro, 15–6, 7–15, 11–3, in the quarterfinals, but then lost to Mexicans Gutierrez and Javier Moreno, 15–6, 15–9, so they were bronze medalists.

Franco represented Colombia at the 2013 Bolivarian Games in Trujillo, Peru. In Men's Singles, he lost in the quarterfinals to Jose Daniel Ugalde of Ecuador, 15–14, 15–12. But he and Alejandro Herrera defeated Peruvians Alfredo Flores and Jose Schaefer in the quarterfinals of Men's Doubles, but lost in the semi-finals to Venezuelans Cesar Castillo and César Castro, 10–15, 15–2, 11–3, so Franco and Herrera earned bronze medals in Trujillo. In the Men's Team event, Franco was part of the Colombian team who took home bronze medals after losing to Ecuador in the semi-finals.

At the 2014 Pan American Racquetball Championships in Santa Cruz de la Sierra, Bolivia, Franco played Men's Singles and Doubles. Franco lost to Ecuador's Fernando Rios, 12–15, 15–7, 11–8, in Round of 16, but in doubles, he and Alejandro Herrera eked out a win over Rios and Jose Daniel Alvarez, 14–15, 15–10, 11–7, but then lost to Argentina's Daniel Maggi and Shai Manzuri, 15–13, 7–15, 11–6, in the quarterfinals.

Thus, Franco had some international experience coming into the 2014 IRF World Championships in Burlington, Ontario, Canada, but he wasn't one of the top seeds in either singles or doubles. After the preliminary round, Franco was seeded 9th in Men's Singles and 7th in Men's Doubles with Alejandro Herrera. In singles, he lost to the USA's Rocky Carson, 15–8, 15–10, in the quarterfinals, and Carson went to win the championship.

But Franco and Herrera won gold in Men's Doubles at the 2014 World Championships. They defeated Mexico's Álvaro Beltrán and Edson Martinez, 15–14, 6–15, 11–9, in the quarterfinals, Bolivians Mario Mercado and Conrrado Moscoso, 15–11, 15–2, in the semi-finals, and then the home country team of Canadians Mike Green and Vincent Gagnon in the final, winning 15–11, 15–5. Franco and Herrera's gold medal was the 1st won by South Americans in any division – singles or doubles, men's or women's – at the IRF World Championships.

== 2015 to 2018 – Breakthrough on the IRT ==
At the 2015 Pan American Championships, Franco narrowly missed out on the medals in Men's Singles, as he lost to Jake Bredenbeck of the US, 13–15, 15–7, 11–10, in the quarterfinals. In Men's Doubles, Franco and Juan Carlos Torres lost to Dominicans Ramon De Leon and Luis Perez, 15–11, 14–15, 11–8, in the quarterfinals.

Franco played most of the event on the International Racquetball Tour in the 2015–16 season, and with considerable success. He reached the semi-finals four times, doing so first at the Krowning Moment Pro Invitational in San Marcos, Texas in October 2015, when he upset Daniel de la Rosa in the Round of 16, 2–11, 11–4, 11–6, 6–11, 11–7, and then beat Robert Collins, 12–15, 11–9, 11–5, 11–4, in the quarterfinals, to set up a semi-final match with Rocky Carson, which Carson won, 11–8, 11–3, 11–7. Nevertheless, Franco became the first South American in an IRT semi-final in San Marcos.

Franco got to the semi-finals on three other occasions in the 2015–16 IRT season, and that helped him finish ranked 9th at the end of the season, becoming one of the first South American players to finish an IRT season in the top 10 (Mario Mercado of Bolivia was 10th that season).

Franco represented Colombia at the 2015 Pan American Games in Toronto, where he played Men's doubles with Alejandro Herrera. They lost in the quarterfinals to Bolivians Conrrado Moscoso and Roland Keller, 8–15, 15–9, 11–6. Colombia also lost to Bolivia in quarterfinals of the Men's Team event.

In the 2016 Pan American Racquetball Championships in San Luis Potosí, Mexico, Franco played Men's Singles and Doubles. In singles, he lost to Mexico's Daniel de la Rosa, 15–5, 15–5, in the quarterfinals. Franco played doubles with Felipe Arenas, and they lost to Mexicans Alejandro Landa and Javier Moreno, 15–11, 15–9, in the quarterfinals.

Franco and Herrera attempted to defend their Men's Doubles World Championship on home soil at the 2016 IRF World Championships held in Cali, Colombia, but they lost in the semi-finals to eventual champions Álvaro Beltrán and Javier Moreno of Mexico, 15–2, 15–5.

Franco reached the quarterfinals of the US Open in 2016, which was then the furthest a South American men's player had reached in racquetball's premier professional event. He lost in the quarters to Kane Waselenchuk, 11–2, 11–4, 11–4. Franco and Mario Mercado also reached the quarterfinals of IRT Doubles at the 2016 US Open, losing to Jake Bredenbeck and Jose Diaz, 15–13, 10–15, 11–7.

He didn't go further than the quarters of the 2016–17 IRT season, but nonetheless Franco finished 8th at the end of the season – one place higher than he had the season before, and a personal best.

In November 2017, Franco won Men's Singles at the 2017 Bolivarian Games in Santa Marta, Colombia by defeating Bolivian Carlos Keller in the semi-finals, 15–14, 11–15, 11–4, and Bolivian Conrrado Moscoso, 15–11, 15–13, in the final. The win was his 1st international gold medal in singles, and Franco's performance helped Colombia get bronze in the team event.

Franco followed up that international victory with a win on the International Racquetball Tour (IRT). He won the March Madness tournament in San Antonio in March 2018. He defeated Álvaro Beltrán in the quarterfinals, Jansen Allen in the semi-finals, and Alejandro Landa in the final to win the title. Franco is the 38th winner in IRT history, and the first South American player to win on the IRT.

That win helped Franco finish 6th at the end of the 2017–18 IRT season, which remains a career best.

Franco competed in the 2018 South American Games in Cochabamba, Bolivia, where he got two silver medals: in Men's Doubles with Mario Mercado, as they only lost to Bolivians Roland Keller and Conrrado Moscoso, and the Men's Team event, where they were beaten by Bolivia in the final. He lost in the quarterfinals of Men's Singles to Moscoso, so didn't get a medal in that event.

In the 2018 IRF World Championships, Franco again played both Men's Singles and Doubles. In singles, he earned a bronze medal by reaching the semi-finals with wins over Carlos Keller of Bolivia in the Round of 16, 15–14, 15–13, and a win over Daniel de la Rosa of Mexico, 15–8, 5–14, 11–10, in the quarterfinals, before losing to Charles Pratt of the US in the semi-finals, 15–8, 15–13. In Men's Doubles, Franco and Mario Mercado lost to the USA team of Rocky Carson and Sudsy Monchik in the quarterfinals, 15–11, 15–13. Nonetheless, Franco got a 3rd medal in as many World Championships.

== 2019 to present – Career continues ==
Franco played 7 of the 9 events in the 2018–19 IRT season, when he reached the semi-finals once and quarterfinals three times. His results combined for another top 10 ranking at the season's end, although Franco's 8th-place ranking was two places lower than in the previous season.

At the 2019 Pan American Games in Lima, Franco played Men's singles and Men's doubles with Mario Mercado. In singles, Franco lost in the Round of 16 to Canadian Coby Iwaasa, 9–15, 15–13, 11–0. In doubles, Franco and Mercado lost in the quarterfinals to the USA's Rocky Carson and Charlie Pratt, 5–15, 15–7, 11–7. However, in the Men's Team event Colombia defeated Canada in the quarterfinals, and upset the two time defending gold medalists Mexico in the semi-finals to set up a showdown with Bolivia in the final. Bolivia won the final two matches to one with Franco losing to Conrrado Moscoso, and Mercado beating Carlos Keller to force the deciding third match, in which Roland Keller and Moscoso defeated Franco and Mercado in doubles. Nonetheless, their silver medal was the first won by Colombian players at the Pan American Games.

Franco had a good start to the 2019–20 IRT season, as he was in the semi-finals of the first events of the season. But then he was upset by Adam Manilla in the Round of 32 at the 2019 US Open Racquetball Championships. Franco only played 3 of the next 7 events that season, and looks like he'll finish outside the top 10 for the first time since 2014–15.

== Career summary ==
Franco has played for Colombia on 14 occasions and won medals seven times. He's won gold twice: in Men's Doubles (with Alejandro Herrera) at the 2014 IRF World Championships and in Men's Singles at the 2017 Bolivarian Games.

Furthermore, Franco has several firsts on the International Racquetball Tour. He's the first South American player in a semi-final, first South American player to win an IRT event, and one of the first to be in the season ending top 10 rankings.

=== Career record ===
This table lists Franco's results across annual events.

Event	2008	2009	2010	2011	2012	2013	2014	2015	2016	2017	2018	2019
US Open	256	256	-	128	64	128	32	32	QF	32	QF	32
IRT Ranking		131	102	29	38	27	41	31	9	8	6	8

Note: W = winner, F = finalist, SF = semi-finalist, QF = quarterfinalist, 16 = Round of 16.
