= Daniel de la Rosa =

Mexican racquetball player

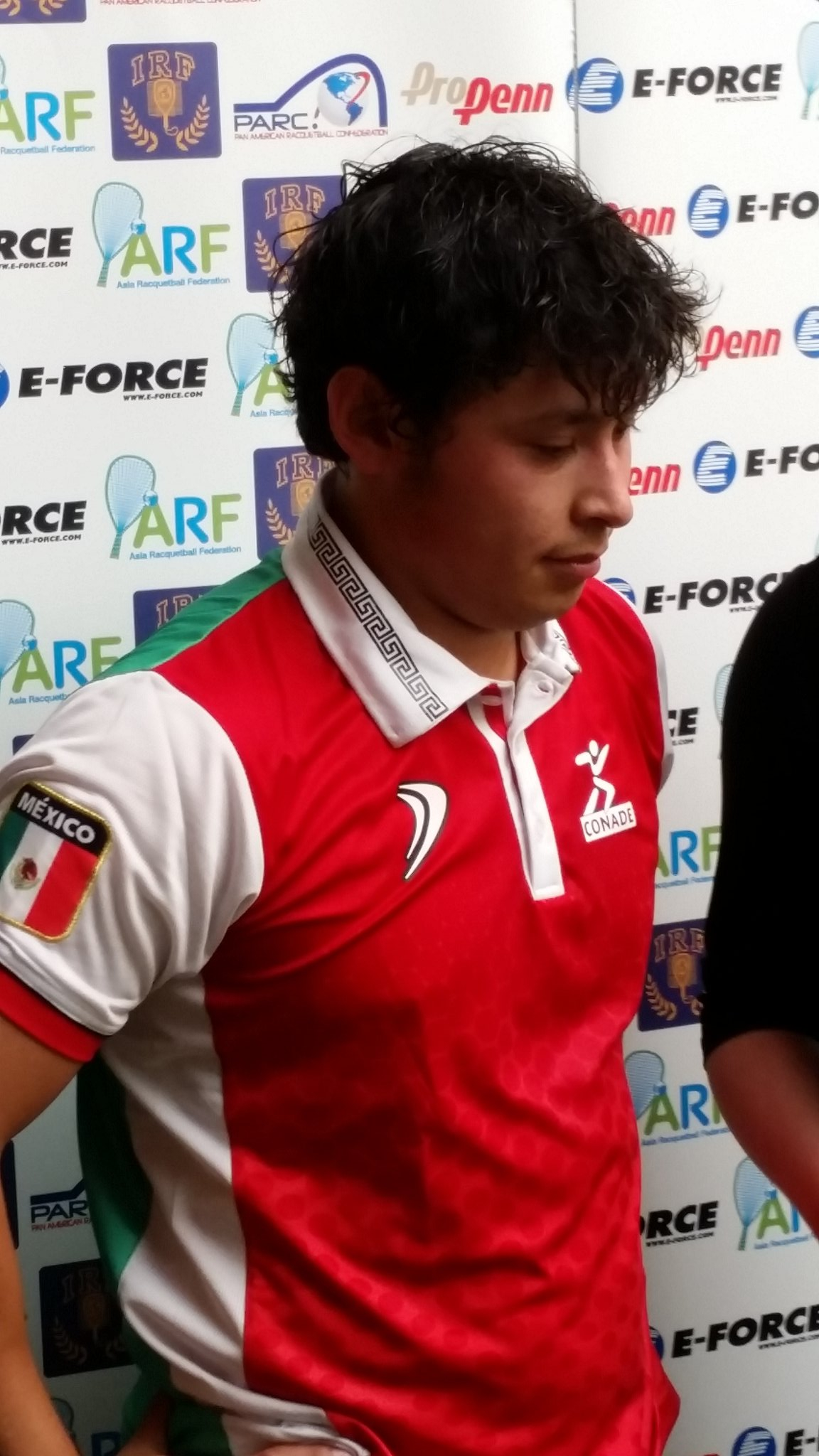
- De La Rosa at the 2016 Pan American Racquetball Championships

Personal information
- Nationality: Mexican
- Born: July 4, 1993 (age 33) San Luis Potosí, Mexico

Sport
- Sport: Racquetball, Pickleball

Achievements and titles
- Highest world ranking: 1st, 2021, 2022, 2023
Medal record
Men's Racquetball
Representing Mexico
World Championships
Gold medal – first place	2022 San Luis Potosí	Doubles
Gold medal – first place	2022 San Luis Potosí	Team
Gold medal – first place	2018 San José	Doubles
Silver medal – second place	2016 Cali	Singles
Pan American Games
Bronze medal – third place	2015 Toronto	Singles
Gold medal – first place	2015 Toronto	Team
Central American and Caribbean Games
Gold medal – first place	2018 Barranquilla	Singles
Gold medal – first place	2018 Barranquilla	Doubles
Gold medal – first place	2018 Barranquilla	Team
Silver medal – second place	2014 Veracruz	Singles
Gold medal – first place	2014 Veracruz	Team
Pan American Racquetball Championships
Gold medal – first place	2011 Managua	Singles
Gold medal – first place	2014 Santa Cruz	Doubles
Gold medal – first place	2016 San Luis Potosí	Singles
Representing USA
World Championships
Gold medal – first place	2024 San Antonio	Singles
Gold medal – first place	2022 San Antonio	Mixed Doubles
Gold medal – first place	2024 San Antonio	Team
Pan American Games
Bronze medal – third place	2023 Santiago	Team

Daniel de la Rosa (born July 4, 1993) is a Mexican-born American Professional racquetball and Professional pickleball player. De La Rosa is the current International Racquetball Federation (IRF) World Champion in both Men's Singles and Mixed Doubles, winning the titles in 2024 in San Antonio, Texas, where he was also part of the US team that won the Men's Team title.

De La Rosa has won 12 times on the International Racquetball Tour (IRT), including the 2021 US Open. De La Rosa is the first Mexican player to win the US Open, and he was the second Mexican player to win an IRT Tier 1 event (after Álvaro Beltrán). Professionally, De La Rosa won three Men's Professional Year end tour Titles (in 2021, 2022, and 2023) before stepping away from Racquetball to focus on his pickleball career.

== Racquetball Junior years – 2007–2011 ==
De La Rosa represented Mexico to the IRF World Junior Championships most of his junior years. At the 2007 World Junior Championships in Cochabamba, Bolivia, De La Rosa lost in the quarterfinals of Boy's U14 Singles to the USA's Dylan Reid, 15–11, 6–14, 11–4, after beating Sebastian Franco of Colombia, 15–0, 15–4, in the Round of 16. He played Boy's U14 Doubles with Missael Leija, and they lost in the semi-finals to Bolivians Carlos Keller and Jorge Luis Michel, 15–4, 15–7. In his second year of 14s, De La Rosa lost in the semi-finals of Boy's U14 Singles at the 2008 World Junior Championships in Tempe, Arizona, as he was beaten by Marco Rojas of the US, 15–10, 15–11. He was runner up in Boy's U14 Doubles with Leija, as they lost in the final to Rojas and Jose Diaz, 13–15, 15–10, 11–4.

In 2009, De La Rosa played Boy's U16 Singles, losing to Carlos Keller of Bolivia in the semi-finals, 13–15, 15–8, 11–8. He also played Boy's U16 Singles following year in Los Angeles, where De La Rosa again lost in the semi-finals, to Jose Diaz of the US, 15–14, 15–9.

De La Rosa was runner up in Boy's U18 Singles at the 2011 World Junior Championships in Santo Domingo, Dominican Republic, as he lost to Carlos Keller of Bolivia in the final, 15–9, 15–5, after defeating the USA's Nick Montalbano, 15–14, 15–13, in the semi-finals, and Canadian Samuel Murray in the quarterfinals, 15–10, 15–6. He played Boy's U18 Doubles with Missael Leija, and they lost in the semi-finals to Montalbano and Joshua Hungerford, 15–12, 12–15, 11–9. That was the last time he played at World Juniors.

De La Rosa represented Mexico at a senior level for the first time in 2011 at age 17, when he played at the Pan American Racquetball Championships in Managua, Nicaragua. In the quarterfinals, De La Rosa beat the player who'd given him so much trouble at World Juniors – Bolivian Carlos Keller, 15–2, 15–8. Then he defeated Canadian Vincent Gagnon in the semi-finals, 15–13, 15–4, before eking out a narrow victory over American Chris Crowther in the final, 12–15, 15–14, 11–9. So, De La Rosa didn't win a World Junior Championship, but won gold in his first national team event.

== Racquetball Professional career begins – 2012–2019 ==
De La Rosa played half of the 12 events of the 2012–13 IRT season, reaching the semi-finals once, quarterfinals three times, and Round of 16 twice. The semi was at the Stockton Pro-Am, where he lost to Rocky Carson in three games, 11–8, 11–2, 11–2. Those results combined to put him 9th at the end of the season, which began a streak of top 10 season finishes that is now in its 9th season. He became the third Mexican player to be in the IRT top 10 after Álvaro Beltrán and Javier Moreno.

In the 2013–14 IRT season, De La Rosa played the tour full time, entering 10 of the 11 events, and getting to a final for the first time, which happened in Davison, Michigan, where he lost to countryman Álvaro Beltrán, 11–8, 10–12, 11–8, 11–4, in what was the first final between two Mexican players in IRT history. That combined with two semi-final finishes and seven quarters put him 5th at the end of the season.

De La Rosa won Men's Doubles at the 2014 Pan American Racquetball Championships with Edson Martinez, beating Americans Jose Rojas and David Horn in the Men's Doubles final, 14–15, 15–12, 11–1.

De La Rosa played for Mexico at the 2014 Central American and Caribbean Games in Veracruz, Mexico, where he earned a silver medal in Men's Singles, losing to Álvaro Beltrán in the final, 15–7, 15–2, and a gold medal in the Men's Team event. De La Rosa defeated Costa Rican Andres Acuña in the final to seal victory for Mexico.

De La Rosa won his first IRT event in December 2014 during his second season playing full time on tour, when he defeated Álvaro Beltrán in the final of the 2014 New Jersey Open, 11–4, 11–6, 9–11, 12–10. De La Rosa reached the final by beating Rocky Carson in the semi-finals, 12–10, 9–11, 11–6, 11–6. He finished 2014–15 ranked 4th.

In 2015, De La Rosa played Men's Singles at the 2015 Pan American Racquetball Championships in Santo Domingo, Dominican Republic, where he lost in the quarterfinals to Bolivian Conrrado Moscoso, 15–14, 15–11. Also that year, De La Rosa played at the 2015 Pan American Games in Toronto, where he was a bronze medalist in Men's singles and a gold medalist in the Men's Team event. De La Rosa lost to the USA's Rocky Carson in the semi-finals of singles, 15–14, 15–8, but helped Mexico win team gold by beating Costa Rica in the quarterfinals, Bolivia in the semi-finals, and the US in the final.

De La Rosa was in five finals in the 2015–16 season, including being a finalist at the US Open – the second Mexican player to do so after Beltran. He reached the final after an epic five game match with Rocky Carson, winning 11–9, 10–12, 8–11, 11–8, 12–10. But in the final, Kane Waselenchuk defeated De La Rosa in straight games, 11–5, 11–8, 11–3. His five finals that season is a career high, but he didn't win any of them. Nonetheless, he finished 3rd, behind Waselenchuk and Carson, at the end of the season, which was also a career high.

In 2016, De La Rosa won Men's Singles at the Pan American Racquetball Championships in his hometown of San Luis Potosí, where he defeated American Jake Bredenbeck in the final 15–2, 15–1. En route to the final, De La Rosa defeated Colombian Sebastian Franco in the quarterfinals, 15–5, 15–5, and Fernando Rios of Ecuador in the semi-finals, 15–12, 15–7. The win was De La Rosa's 2nd Pan American Championship in Men's Singles.

De La Rosa earned a silver medal at the 2016 Racquetball World Championships in Cali, Colombia, where he lost to Rocky Carson in the final, 15–11, 5–15, 11–5. He beat Luis Perez of the Dominican Republic in the quarterfinals, 15–6, 15–0, and then defeated Canadian Samuel Murray, 15–12, 15–7, in the semi-finals.

De La Rosa won his 2nd IRT event in January 2017, when he won the 39th Annual Lewis Drug Pro-Am in Sioux Falls, South Dakota. He defeated Álvaro Beltrán in the final, 11–9, 11–4, 11–7, and then teamed up with Beltran to win the doubles title – with friend Beltran as his partner – by defeating Rocky Carson and Jose Diaz, 15–12, 15–14. That was one of three finals De La Rosa was in during the 2016–17 IRT season, and helped him finish 3rd again.

De La Rosa's 3rd career IRT title came in January 2018 at the LA Open in Canoga Park, California, where he defeated Jansen Allen in the quarterfinals, 15–2, 15–3, Rocky Carson in the semi-finals, 15–5, 15–7, and then got a forfeit win over Kane Waselenchuk in the final, as Waselenchuk injured his left knee during his semi-final match. He was in one other final in the 2017–18 season, but also lost four times in the Round of 16, which is the most losses he's had in the 16s. Thus, his ranking slipped a place to 4th at season's end.

De La Rosa won Men's Doubles with Álvaro Beltrán at the 2018 IRF World Championships in San José, Costa Rica. They defeated the US team of Rocky Carson and Sudsy Monchik, 10–15, 15–9, 11–2, in the final after beating Bolivians Roland Keller and Conrrado Moscoso in the semi-finals, 15–14, 15–8.

In 2018–19, De La Rosa was in three finals on the IRT, but failed to win any of them. He slid further down the rankings, finishing 6th at season's end.

== First US Open victory and becoming No. 1 on the IRT – 2020–present ==
In the 2019–20 IRT season, De La Rosa was in two finals, winning the 42nd Lewis Drug Pro-Am in Sioux Falls, South Dakota, where he defeated Rocky Carson in the quarterfinals, 15–12, 15–11, Conrrado Moscoso in the semi-finals, 15–8, 15–11, and then Eduardo Portillo in the final, 15–14, 15–9. He also won Men's Doubles in Sioux Falls, as he and Álvaro Beltrán defeated Javier Mar and Rodrigo Montoya in the final, 15–13, 10–15, 11–2. Still, he finished 6th at season's end once again.

Then in 2021, De La Rosa won three consecutive IRT tournaments, including 2021 US Open, which was his first US Open title. The run began with a win in Highlands Ranch, Colorado, where he beat Conrrado Moscoso in the final, 15–7, 15–13, after defeating Eduardo Portillo, 15–5, 10–15, 11–2, in the semi-finals, and Andree Parrilla in the quarterfinals, 15–10, 15–10. It continued with a win at the Shamrock Shootout in Lombard, Illinois, where De La Rosa defeated Jake Bredenbeck in the final, 15–10, 13–15, 11–1, after defeating Samuel Murray, 15–10, 15–12, in the semi-finals. Again, he and Beltran won Men's Doubles beating Parrilla and Portillo in the final, 15–8, 15–8, after wins over Javier Mar and Rodrigo Montoya, 15–12, 15–11, in the semi-finals, and Sudsy Monchik and Kane Waselenchuk, 15–14, 15–14, in the quarterfinals.

Most recently, De La Rosa won the 2021 US Open in Minneapolis by defeating Carlos Keller, 15–13, 11–15, 11–3, in the final. In the semi-finals, he defeated Andree Parrilla, 6–15, 15–10, 11–5, and in the quarterfinals, Eduardo Portillo, 15–13, 15–8. Also in Minneapolis, De La Rosa and Beltran won Men's Doubles, as they beat Alejandro Landa and Samuel Murray in the final, 15–11, 15–11. They defeated Javier Mar and Rodrigo Montoya, 15–12, 10–15, 11–8, in the semi-finals, and Roland Keller and Conrrado Moscoso in the quarterfinals, 15–14, 14–15, 11–4. The US Open win and his other titles in 2021 helped De La Rosa finish the year as the IRT's No. 1 player.

In 2022, De La Rosa won twice on the IRT, and that helped him finish No. 1 at season's end for a second consecutive year.

In 2023, De La Rosa decided to switch from playing internationally for Mexico to the USA. So, he played the USA Racquetball national championships for the first time. At the 2023 USA Racquetball National Doubles Championships, De La Rosa and Alejandro Landa won Men's Doubles. They defeated Jake Bredenbeck and Sam Bredenbeck, 12–10, 6–11, 11–7, 10–12, 11–2, in the semi-finals, and then Wayne Antone and Adam Manilla, 15-13, 11-5, 11-8, in the final. In mixed doubles, he and Holly Scott reached the final with a win over Landa and Michelle Key, 14-12, 11-3, 11-9, but then lost to Adam Manilla and Erika Manilla, 11-6, 11-8, 10-12, 11-9.

De La Rosa won the 2023 USA Racquetball National Singles Championship, defeating Adam Manilla in the final, 3-11, 11-9, 11-8, 9-11, 11-6, and Alejandro Landa, 11–9, 11–9, 11–3, in the semi-finals. The win qualified him to play for the USA at the 2023 Pan American Games.

Thus, De La Rosa made his Team USA debut at the 2023 Pan American Games in Santiago, Chile, where he played singles, doubles and in the team event. In Men's Singles, he lost to Mexican Eduardo Portillo, 10-12, 13-11, 12-10, 9-11, 14-12, in the quarterfinals. He played Men's Doubles with Alejandro Landa, and they lost to Canadians Coby Iwaasa and Samuel Murray, 4-11, 8-11, 11-8, 11-8, 11-4, in the quarterfinals. But in the Men's Team event, the USA defeated Ecuador in the quarterfinals, and then lost to Bolivia in the semi-finals, with De La Rosa and Landa winning the doubles match against Kadim Carrasco and Conrrado Moscoso, 11-5, 10-12, 12-10, 11-13, 11-4, but Moscoso defeated De La Rosa, 11-5, 11-8, 9-11, 8-11, 11-6, in the deciding singles match.

In 2023, De La Rosa won three times on the IRT, and that helped him finish No. 1 at season's end for the third year running.

== Professional Pickleball Career ==
De La Rosa began competing professionally in Pickleball in 2021, and quickly began to attract attention in the industry. He signed a 3-year contract exclusively with the PPA in July 2024, and has been competing in Major League Pickleball since January 2023. His MLP career includes stints in 2023 with the Austin Pickleballers and the Dallas Pickleball Club, and he was drafted by the Brooklyn Aces for the 2024 season. He owns two MLP titles: Advil Targeted Relief MLP Mid-Season Tournament (July 2024) and MLP San Clemente (June 2023).

== Racquetball Career summary ==
De La Rosa has been in 31 IRT finals, winning 12 times over 111 tournaments (as of December 12, 2023). His IRT wins are highlighted by the 2021 US Open Championship.

Playing for Mexico, De La Rosa has won 11 gold medals for Mexico, as well as 2 silver medals and 1 bronze, and he's won them over 9 international events. Three of the gold medals have been in Men's Singles (two at the Pan American Racquetball Championships & one at the Central American and Caribbean Games) and four in Men's Doubles (two at the World Championships, and one each at the Pan American Championships, & Central American and Caribbean Games) with the other four in Men's Team events (one at the Pan American Games, one at the World Championships & two at the Central American and Caribbean Games).

Playing for the USA, De La Rosa earned a bronze medal in the Men's Team event at the 2023 Pan American Games in Santiago, Chile.

=== Racquetball Career record ===
This table lists De La Rosa's results across annual events.

Event	2008	2009	2010	2011	2012	2013	2014	2015	2016	2017	2018	2019	2020	2021	2022	2023
US Open	64	64	32	16	QF	QF	QF	F	SF	QF	F	SF	P	W	16	-
US Open Doubles							SF	QF	F	F	W	F	P	W	W	-
IRT Ranking	-	92	122	19	19	9	5	4	3	3	4	6	6	1	1	1

Note: W = winner, F = finalist, SF = semi-finalist, QF = quarterfinalist, 16 = Round of 16. P = pandemic. There was no US Open in 2023.

== Personal life ==
A native of San Luis Potosí, Mexico, De La Rosa currently resides in San Antonio, Texas. He was previously married to Michelle De La Rosa (née Key), who is also a competitive racquetball player having played on the Ladies Professional Racquetball Tour and on Team USA. They have two children together. He is currently in a relationship with Hollie Scott, also a professional racquetball player.

De La Rosa is sponsored by Pro Kennex.

== See also ==
- List of racquetball players

Sporting positions
Preceded by Kane Waselenchuk	Number 1 Men's Pro Racquetball Player; 2021 to present	Succeeded by Current
