= Shooting at the 2015 Pan American Games – Qualification =

== Qualification system ==
A total of 250 sport shooters will qualify to compete at the games. The winner of each event at the 2014 South American Games and 2014 Central American and Caribbean Games will qualify for the Games. The remaining qualifying spots will be decided at the 2014 Pan American Shooting Championship. The host nation is guaranteed 15 athletes (one per event) and a further five wildcards will be awarded. A nation may enter a maximum of 25 athletes across all events.

An athlete may only claim one quota spot for their country. For the two regional games quotas will be awarded in the order the events are held. For the Continental Championship: rifle quotas for men will be awarded in the following order: prone, air rifle and three position. Women's rifle quotas will be awarded in air rifle, followed by three positions. Pistol quotas will be awarded in the event sequence: 25 meter, 50 meter and 10 meter for men and 10m followed by 25m for women. There was no award schedule for the shotgun events at the event.

A nation may transfer a pistol quota earned in one event to another event within the discipline only. An athlete may enter more than one event, granted no more than two athletes per country contest the event.

== Qualification timeline ==
Event	Date	Venue
2014 South American Games	March 12–18, 2014	(Chile) Santiago
2014 Pan American Championships	October 13–20, 2014	(Mexico) Guadalajara
2014 Central American and Caribbean Games	November 15–24, 2014	(Mexico) Veracruz

== Qualification summary ==
The final quota allocation table as of April 9, 2015:

Nation	Men									Women						Total
Nation	FR 3x40	FR 60PR	AR 60	FP	RFP	AP 60	TR 125	DT 150	SK 125	STR 3x20	AR 40	SP	AP 40	TR 75	SK 75	Athletes
Argentina	1	2	2		1	2	2		2	1	1		2		1	17
Barbados									1						1	2
Brazil		2	1	1	2	2	2	2	1	1	1		1	2	1	19
Bolivia			1	1	1		2									6
Canada	2	2	2	1	1	2	2	1	2	2	2	2	2	2	1	25
Chile	1		1	1			1		2		1			1	1	10
Colombia					1		2	1	1		1	1				7
Costa Rica		1														1
Cuba	1	1	1	2	2	1			2	2	2	2	1			16
Dominican Republic		1				1	2	2	2							9
Ecuador				1						2	1		2			8
El Salvador	2			1	1					2	1		1			9
Guatemala	2		2	1	2	2	2	1	2	1	2	2	1	1	1	21
Honduras																1
Jamaica																1
Mexico	2	1	2	2		2	2		2	2	2	1	2		2	22
Nicaragua																2
Panama				1			2									4
Paraguay								1								1
Peru		1		1	1	1	1	1	2			2				12
Puerto Rico						1	1	1	2	1	1			2		10
Trinidad and Tobago						1										2
United States	2	2	2	2	2	2	2	2	2	2	2	1	2	2	2	25
Uruguay																1
Venezuela	2	1		1	1	2	2	1	2	1	2	1	2			18
Virgin Islands																2
Total: 26 NOCs	15	13	14	15	17	18	26	13	26	17	19	12	16	10	10	250

== Men ==
=== 50 m rifle three positions ===
Event	Quota Places	Qualified countries	Qualified Athlete
Host	1	Canada	
South American Games	1	Venezuela	Martrin Gutierrez
Pan American Championships	12	Argentina	Pablo Alvarez
Pan American Championships	12	Canada	Grzegorz Sych
Pan American Championships	12	Chile	Marcos Huerta
Pan American Championships	12	Cuba	Yoleisy Lois
Pan American Championships	12	El Salvador	Oliser Zelaya
Pan American Championships	12	Guatemala	Marlon Perez
Pan American Championships	12	Guatemala	Octavio Sandoval
Pan American Championships	12	Mexico	José Luis Sánchez
Pan American Championships	12	Mexico	Alvaro Sanchez Zavala
Pan American Championships	12	United States	Joseph Hein
Pan American Championships	12	United States	Timothy Sherry
Pan American Championships	12	Venezuela	Raul Vargas
Central American and Caribbean Games	1	El Salvador	Israel Gutierrez
TOTAL	15		

=== 50 m rifle prone ===
Event	Quota Places	Qualified countries	Qualified Athlete
Host	1	Canada	
South American Games	1	Argentina	Rosendo Velarte
Pan American Championships	10	Argentina	Juan Angeloni
Pan American Championships	10	Brazil	Leonardo Moreira
Pan American Championships	10	Brazil	Cassio Rippel
Pan American Championships	10	Canada	Gale Stewart
Pan American Championships	10	Cuba	Reinier Estpinan
Pan American Championships	10	Mexico	Luis Morales Acevedo
Pan American Championships	10	Peru	Daniel Vizcarra
Pan American Championships	10	United States	David Higgins
Pan American Championships	10	United States	Eric Uptagrafft
Pan American Championships	10	Venezuela	Julio Iemma Hernandez
Central American Games and Caribbean Games	1	Dominican Republic	Hosman Duran
TOTAL	13		

=== 10 m air rifle ===
Event	Quota Places	Qualified countries	Qualified Athlete
Host	1	Canada	Benjamin Taylor
South American Games	1	Brazil	Bruno Heck
Pan American Championships	11	Argentina	Valentin Cabrera
Pan American Championships	11	Argentina	Antonio Lacerna
Pan American Championships	11	Bolivia	Cristian Morales
Pan American Championships	11	Canada	Cory Neifer
Pan American Championships	11	Chile	Elias San Martin
Pan American Championships	11	Cuba	Alexander Molerio
Pan American Championships	11	Guatemala	Allan Chinchilla
Pan American Championships	11	Mexico	Luis Madrazo Morales
Pan American Championships	11	Mexico	Gerado Chaires
Pan American Championships	11	United States	Dempster Christenson
Pan American Championships	11	United States	Connor Davis
Central American Games and Caribbean Games	1	Guatemala	Kenny Matta
TOTAL	14		

=== 50 m pistol ===
Event	Quota Places	Qualified countries	Qualified Athlete
Host	1	Canada	
South American Games	1	Chile	Manuel Maturana
Pan American Championships	12	Bolivia	Rudolf Knijnenburg
Pan American Championships	12	Brazil	Stenio Yamamoto
Pan American Championships	12	Cuba	Jorge Grau Potrille
Pan American Championships	12	Cuba	Eliecer Mora
Pan American Championships	12	Ecuador	Esteban Pozo
Pan American Championships	12	El Salvador	Jorge Pimentel
Pan American Championships	12	Guatemala	Marvin Herrera Chon
Pan American Championships	12	Panama	David Munoz Hidalgo
Pan American Championships	12	Peru	Enrique Arnaez
Pan American Championships	12	United States	Jason Turner
Pan American Championships	12	United States	John Zurek
Pan American Championships	12	Venezuela	Edilio Centeno
Central American Games and Caribbean Games	1	Mexico	Maurillo Morales Castill
TOTAL	15		

=== 25 m rapid fire pistol ===
Event	Quota Places	Qualified countries	Qualified Athlete
Host	1	Canada	
South American Games	1	Brazil	Emerson Duarte
Pan American Championships	14	Argentina	Juan Savarino
Pan American Championships	14	Bolivia	Diego Cossio Quiroga
Pan American Championships	14	Brazil	Júlio Almeida
Pan American Championships	14	Colombia	Alex Peralta Enciso
Pan American Championships	14	Cuba	Leuris Pupo
Pan American Championships	14	Cuba	Jorge Álvarez
Pan American Championships	14	El Salvador	Hermes Barahona
Pan American Championships	14	Guatemala	Marvin Herrera Chon
Pan American Championships	14	Guatemala	Sergio Sánchez
Pan American Championships	14	Mexico	Adan Rodriguez Carrillo
Pan American Championships	14	Peru	Marko Carrillo
Pan American Championships	14	United States	Alexander Chichkov
Pan American Championships	14	United States	Keith Sanderson
Pan American Championships	14	Venezuela	Felipe Beuvrín
Central American Games and Caribbean Games	1	Venezuela	Douglas Gomez
TOTAL	17		

=== 10 m air pistol ===
Event	Quota Places	Qualified countries	Qualified Athlete
Host	1	Canada	
South American Games	1	Brazil	Felipe Almeida Wu
Pan American Championships	15	Argentina	Sebastian Lobo
Pan American Championships	15	Argentina	Fernando Pozo Neira
Pan American Championships	15	Brazil	Jose Carlos Batista
Pan American Championships	15	Canada	Mark Hynes
Pan American Championships	15	Cuba	Guillermo Pias
Pan American Championships	15	Dominican Republic	Josue Hernandez Caba
Pan American Championships	15	Guatemala	Romeo Cruz
Pan American Championships	15	Guatemala	Jose Castillo Aguilar
Pan American Championships	15	Mexico	Mario Gutierrez
Pan American Championships	15	Mexico	Antonio Tavarez
Pan American Championships	15	Peru	Ivan Galvez
Pan American Championships	15	Puerto Rico	Luis Lopez
Pan American Championships	15	United States	Will Brown
Pan American Championships	15	United States	James Henderson
Pan American Championships	15	Venezuela	Marcos Núñez
Central American Games and Caribbean Games	1	Trinidad and Tobago	Roger Daniel
TOTAL	18		

=== Trap ===
Event	Quota Places	Qualified countries	Qualified Athlete
Host	1	Canada	Paul Shaw
South American Games	1	Colombia	Danilo Caro
Pan American Championships	23	Argentina	Carlos Belletini
Pan American Championships	23	Argentina	Fernando Borello
Pan American Championships	23	Bolivia	Marcelo Arana Urioste
Pan American Championships	23	Bolivia	Cesar Menacho
Pan American Championships	23	Brazil	Rodrigo Bastos
Pan American Championships	23	Brazil	Eduardo Correa
Pan American Championships	23	Canada	Drew Shaw
Pan American Championships	23	Chile	Claudio Vergara Bernabe
Pan American Championships	23	Colombia	Luis Reyna
Pan American Championships	23	Dominican Republic	Eduardo Lorenzo
Pan American Championships	23	Dominican Republic	Sergio Piñero
Pan American Championships	23	Guatemala	Hebert Brol
Pan American Championships	23	Guatemala	Jean Brol Cardenas
Pan American Championships	23	Mexico	Juan Zanella Chain
Pan American Championships	23	Mexico	Ramon Toca Trevino
Pan American Championships	23	Panama	San Martin Garcia Manuel
Pan American Championships	23	Panama	Eduardo Taylor Nunez
Pan American Championships	23	Peru	Francisco Boza
Pan American Championships	23	Puerto Rico	Lucas Bennazar Ortiz
Pan American Championships	23	United States	Ryan Hadden
Pan American Championships	23	United States	Casey Wallace
Pan American Championships	23	Venezuela	Ricardo Cortina
Pan American Championships	23	Venezuela	Leonel Martinez
Central American Games and Caribbean Games	1	–	–
TOTAL	26		

- No eligible athlete was eligible for a quota at the Central American Games and Caribbean Games, and thus this spot will be awarded as a wildcard.

=== Double trap ===
Event	Quota Places	Qualified countries	Qualified Athlete
Host	1	Canada	
South American Games	1	Peru	Asier Cilloniz
Pan American Championships	10	Brazil	Luiz Garca
Pan American Championships	10	Brazil	Jaison Santin
Pan American Championships	10	Colombia	Hernando Vega
Pan American Championships	10	Dominican Republic	Elvin Rodgers
Pan American Championships	10	Guatemala	Enrique Brol
Pan American Championships	10	Paraguay	Paulo Reichardt
Pan American Championships	10	Puerto Rico	José Torres Laboy
Pan American Championships	10	United States	Derek Haldeman
Pan American Championships	10	United States	Ian Rupert
Pan American Championships	10	Venezuela	Franco Di Mauro
Central American Games and Caribbean Games	1	Dominican Republic	Henry Tejada
TOTAL	13		

=== Skeet ===
Event	Quota Places	Qualified countries	Qualified Athlete
Host	1	Canada	Jonathan Weslake
South American Games	1	Peru	Nicholas Espinoza
Pan American Championships	23	Argentina	Fernando Gazzotti
Pan American Championships	23	Argentina	Federico Gil
Pan American Championships	23	Barbados	Michael Maskell
Pan American Championships	23	Brazil	Renato Portella
Pan American Championships	23	Canada	Richard McBride
Pan American Championships	23	Chile	Jorge Atalah
Pan American Championships	23	Chile	Piero Olivari
Pan American Championships	23	Colombia	Diego Duarte
Pan American Championships	23	Cuba	Servando Puldón
Pan American Championships	23	Cuba	Juan Rodriguez Martinez
Pan American Championships	23	Dominican Republic	Julio Dujarric
Pan American Championships	23	Dominican Republic	Julio Dujarric Lembcke
Pan American Championships	23	Guatemala	Juan Carlos Romero
Pan American Championships	23	Guatemala	Juan Schaeffer
Pan American Championships	23	Mexico	Luis Gallardo
Pan American Championships	23	Mexico	Javier Rodríguez
Pan American Championships	23	Peru	Nicolas Giha
Pan American Championships	23	Puerto Rico	Luiz Bermudez
Pan American Championships	23	Puerto Rico	Jesus Medero
Pan American Championships	23	United States	Vincent Hancock
Pan American Championships	23	United States	Frank Thompson
Pan American Championships	23	Venezuela	Lucio Gomez
Pan American Championships	23	Venezuela	Victor Silva
Central American Games and Caribbean Games	1	–	–
TOTAL	26		

- No eligible athlete was eligible for a quota at the Central American Games and Caribbean Games, and thus this spot will be awarded as a wildcard.

== Women ==
=== 50 m rifle three positions ===
Event	Quota Places	Qualified countries	Qualified Athlete
Host	1	Canada	
South American Games	1	Venezuela	Diliana Méndez
Pan American Championships	14	Argentina	Amelia Fournel
Pan American Championships	14	Brazil	Cristina Baptista
Pan American Championships	14	Canada	Shannon Westlake
Pan American Championships	14	Cuba	Linet Aguiar
Pan American Championships	14	Cuba	Dianelys Pérez
Pan American Championships	14	Ecuador	Maria Andrade
Pan American Championships	14	Ecuador	Sofia Padilla
Pan American Championships	14	El Salvador	Johanna Pineda
Pan American Championships	14	El Salvador	Ana Ramirez Henriquez
Pan American Championships	14	Mexico	Alexis Martínez
Pan American Championships	14	Mexico	Andrea Palafox
Pan American Championships	14	Puerto Rico	Amy Bock Laguer
Pan American Championships	14	United States	Amanda Furrer
Pan American Championships	14	United States	Amy Sowash
Central American Games and Caribbean Games	1	Guatemala	Diana Maria Velasco
TOTAL	17		

=== 10 m air rifle ===
Event	Quota Places	Qualified countries	Qualified Athlete
Host	1	Canada	
South American Games	1	Venezuela	Dairene Marquez
Pan American Championships	16	Argentina	Fernanda Russo
Pan American Championships	16	Brazil	Rosane Ewald
Pan American Championships	16	Canada	Monica Fyfe
Pan American Championships	16	Chile	Gabriela Lobos
Pan American Championships	16	Colombia	Camila Osorio
Pan American Championships	16	Cuba	Eglys De La Cruz
Pan American Championships	16	Cuba	Elayne Perez Hage
Pan American Championships	16	Ecuador	Giovanna Lopez Carrillo
Pan American Championships	16	El Salvador	Melissa Mikec
Pan American Championships	16	Guatemala	Maria Guerra Alvarado
Pan American Championships	16	Guatemala	Jazmine Matta Alvarado
Pan American Championships	16	Mexico	Lia Borgo Torres
Pan American Championships	16	Mexico	Salma Maricruz Ramos
Pan American Championships	16	Puerto Rico	Yarimar Mercado Martinez
Pan American Championships	16	United States	Sarah Beard
Pan American Championships	16	United States	Meredith Carpenter
Central American Games and Caribbean Games	1	Venezuela	Beggxula Olivia
TOTAL	19		

=== 25 m pistol ===
Event	Quota Places	Qualified countries	Qualified Athlete
Host	1	Canada	Patricia Boulay
South American Games	1	Peru	Brianda Rivera
Pan American Championships	9	Canada	Lea Wachowich
Pan American Championships	9	Colombia	Amanda Mondol Cuellar
Pan American Championships	9	Cuba	Claudia Hernandez
Pan American Championships	9	Cuba	Cheila Sanabria
Pan American Championships	9	Guatemala	Delmi Cruz Monzon
Pan American Championships	9	Guatemala	Lucia Menendez
Pan American Championships	9	Peru	Mariana Quintanilla
Pan American Championships	9	United States	Enkelejda Shehaj Bekruti
Pan American Championships	9	Venezuela	Editzy Pimentel
Central American Games and Caribbean Games	1	Mexico	Mariana Castillo
TOTAL	12		

=== 10 m air pistol ===
Event	Quota Places	Qualified countries	Qualified Athlete
Host	1	Canada	
South American Games	1	Venezuela	Maribel Pineda
Pan American Championships	13	Argentina	Laura Cecilia Ramos
Pan American Championships	13	Argentina	Maria Pia Herrera
Pan American Championships	13	Brazil	Rachel Silveira
Pan American Championships	13	Canada	Lynda Kiejko
Pan American Championships	13	Cuba	Laina Pérez
Pan American Championships	13	Ecuador	Jenny Bedoya
Pan American Championships	13	Ecuador	Andrea Perez Pena
Pan American Championships	13	El Salvador	Lilian Castro
Pan American Championships	13	Mexico	Alejandra Cervantes Rodriguez
Pan American Championships	13	Mexico	Alejandra Zavala
Pan American Championships	13	United States	Teresa Chambers
Pan American Championships	13	United States	Sandra Uptagrafft
Pan American Championships	13	Venezuela	Ivon Bucott
Central American Games and Caribbean Games	1	Guatemala	Geraldine Solorzano
TOTAL	16		

=== Trap ===
Event	Quota Places	Qualified countries	Qualified Athlete
Host	1	Canada	
South American Games	~~1~~ 0	–	–
Pan American Championships	~~7~~ 8	Brazil	Ludmila Melo
Pan American Championships	~~7~~ 8	Brazil	Janice Teixeira
Pan American Championships	~~7~~ 8	Canada	Cynthia Meyer
Pan American Championships	~~7~~ 8	Chile	Pamela Salman
Pan American Championships	~~7~~ 8	Puerto Rico	Ana Latorre
Pan American Championships	~~7~~ 8	Puerto Rico	Vivian Rodriguez
Pan American Championships	~~7~~ 8	United States	Janessa Beaman
Pan American Championships	~~7~~ 8	United States	Ashley Carroll
Central American Games and Caribbean Games	1	Guatemala	Ana Soto Abril
TOTAL	10		

- The women's trap event was not held at the South American Games, and an additional quota was awarded at the Pan American Championships.

=== Skeet ===
Event	Quota Places	Qualified countries	Qualified Athlete
Host	1	Canada	
South American Games	1	Brazil	Daniela Carraro
Pan American Championships	~~7~~ 8	Argentina	Melisa Gil
Pan American Championships	~~7~~ 8	Barbados	Michelle Elliot
Pan American Championships	~~7~~ 8	Chile	Francisca Crovetto
Pan American Championships	~~7~~ 8	Guatemala	Andrea Romero Leiva
Pan American Championships	~~7~~ 8	Mexico	Anabel Molina
Pan American Championships	~~7~~ 8	Mexico	Gabriela Rodríguez
Pan American Championships	~~7~~ 8	United States	Haley Dunn
Pan American Championships	~~7~~ 8	United States	Amber English
Central American Games and Caribbean Games	~~1~~ 0	–	–
TOTAL	10		

- The women's skeet event was not held at the Central American and Caribbean Games, and an additional quota was awarded at the Pan American Championships.
