= Shooting at the 2018 Central American and Caribbean Games =

- Venue: Club de Tiro Deportivo
- Location: (Colombia) Barranquilla
- Dates: 22–31 July

The shooting competition at the 2018 Central American and Caribbean Games was held in Barranquilla, Colombia from 22 to 31 July and were held at the Club de Tiro Deportivo.

== Medal summary ==
=== Men's events ===
Event	Gold	Silver	Bronze
50m Rifle 3 Positions	José Sánchez (MEX)	Luis Morales (MEX)	Reynier Estopiñán (CUB)
50m Rifle 3 Positions Team	Mexico (MEX); José Sánchez; Alfonso Manrique; Luis Morales	Cuba (CUB); Alexander Molerio; Reynier Estopiñán; Rainier Quintanilla	Guatemala (GUA); Octavio Sandoval; Allan Chinchilla; Marlon Pérez
50m Rifle Prone	José Sánchez (MEX)	Ivan Lopez (COL)	Alain Girard (MTQ)
50m Rifle Prone Team	Guatemala (GUA); Allan Chinchilla; Marlon Pérez; Octavio Sandoval	Mexico (MEX); José Sánchez; Alfonso Manrique; Luis Morales	Colombia (COL); Ivan Lopez; Guido Lastra; Pedro Velasco
10m Air Rifle	Edson Ramirez (MEX)	Reynier Estopiñán (CUB)	Alexander Molerio (CUB)
10m Air Rifle Team	Mexico (MEX); Edson Ramirez; José Sánchez; Luis Morales	Cuba (CUB); Reynier Estopiñán; Alexander Molerio; Alejandro Betancourt	Guatemala (GUA); Allan Chinchilla; Octavio Sandoval; Marlon Pérez
50m Pistol	Daniel Urquiza (MEX)	Albino Jimenez (GUA)	Jorge Grau (CUB)
50m Pistol Team	Mexico (MEX); Daniel Urquiza; David Pérez; Gilberto Palafox	Cuba (CUB); Jorge Grau; Guillermo Pias; Eliecer Mora	Guatemala (GUA); Albino Jimenez; Wilmar Madrid; Jose Castillo
25m Rapid Fire Pistol	Jorge Álvarez (CUB)	Leuris Pupo (CUB)	Bernardo Tobar Prado (COL)
25m Rapid Fire Pistol Team	Cuba (CUB); Jorge Álvarez; Leuris Pupo; Juan Pérez	Venezuela (VEN); Douglas Gomez; Felipe Beuvrín; Edilio Centeno	Colombia (COL); Bernardo Tobar Prado; Alex Peralta; Victor Tobar
25m Standard Pistol	Jorge Grau (CUB)	Jose Castillo (GUA)	Alex Peralta (COL)
25m Standard Pistol Team	Cuba (CUB); Jorge Grau; Jorge Álvarez; Leuris Pupo	Guatemala (GUA); Jose Castillo; Marvin Herrera; Wilmar Madrid	Venezuela (VEN); Felipe Beuvrín; Douglas Gomez; Edilio Centeno
10m Air Pistol	Jorge Grau (CUB)	Guillermo Pias (CUB)	Daniel Urquiza (MEX)
10m Air Pistol Team	Cuba (CUB); Jorge Grau; Guillermo Pias; Eliecer Mora	Guatemala (GUA); Jose Castillo; Albino Jimenez; Wilmar Madrid	Panama (PAN); Juan Campos; David Munoz; Ricardo Chandeck
Trap	Jean Pierre Brol (GUA)	Eduardo Lorenzo (DOM)	Fernando Brol (GUA)
Trap Team	Guatemala (GUA); Hebert Brol; Jean Pierre Brol; Fernando Brol	Colombia (COL); Esteban Caro; Danilo Caro; Hernando Vega	Dominican Republic (DOM); Eduardo Lorenzo; Sergio Piñero; David Yunes
Double Trap	Fernando Brol (GUA)	Hebert Brol (GUA)	Danilo Caro (COL)
Double Trap Team	Guatemala (GUA); Fernando Brol; Hebert Brol; Pablo Duarte	Colombia (COL); Danilo Caro; Luis Reyna; Hernando Vega	Mexico (MEX); Jorge Orozco; Jorge Todd; Jesus Balboa
Skeet	Guillermo Torres (CUB)	Julio Dujarric (DOM)	Juan Rodriguez (CUB)
Skeet Team	Puerto Rico (PUR); Luis Bermudez III; Jesus Medero; Miguel Pizarro	Cuba (CUB); Juan Rodriguez; Guillermo Torres; Servando Puldón	Guatemala (GUA); Joaquin Molina; Diego Bermudez; Rodrigo Zachrisson

=== Women's events ===
Event	Gold	Silver	Bronze
50m Rifle 3 Positions	Eglis de la Cruz (CUB)	Nancy Leal (MEX)	Sofia Hernandez (MEX)
50m Rifle 3 Positions Team	Cuba (CUB); Dianelys Pérez; Eglis de la Cruz; Lisbet Hernandez	Mexico (MEX); Erendira Barba; Sofia Hernandez; Nancy Leal	Guatemala (GUA); Polymaria Velasquez; Tatiana Linares; Maria Guerra
50m Rifle Prone	Polymaria Velasquez (GUA)	Erendira Barba (MEX)	Maria Guerra (GUA)
50m Rifle Prone Team	Guatemala (GUA); Polymaria Velasquez; Maria Guerra; Tatiana Linares	El Salvador (ESA); Ana Ramirez; Melissa Pérez; Johanna Pineda	Mexico (MEX); Erendira Barba; Nancy Leal; Sofia Hernandez
10m Air Rifle	Gabriela Martínez (MEX)	Ana Ramirez (ESA)	Dianelys Pérez (CUB)
10m Air Rifle Team	Cuba (CUB); Dianelys Pérez; Eglis de la Cruz; Lisbet Hernandez	Mexico (MEX); Sofia Hernandez; Gabriela Martínez; Erendira Barba	Guatemala (GUA); Jazmine Matta; Polymaria Velasquez; Tatiana Linares
25m Pistol	Alejandra Zavala (MEX)	Laina Pérez (CUB)	Karen Quezada (MEX)
25m Pistol Team	Cuba (CUB); Laina Pérez; Sheyla Gonzalez; Claudia Hernandez	Guatemala (GUA); Lucia Menendez; Kimberly Linares; Delmi Cruz	Mexico (MEX); Karen Quezada; Alejandra Zavala; Rosa Zuniga
10m Air Pistol	Karen Quezada (MEX)	Alejandra Zavala (MEX)	Kimberly Linares (GUA)
10m Air Pistol Team	Mexico (MEX); Karen Quezada; Alejandra Zavala; Elba Vega	Cuba (CUB); Laina Pérez; Sheyla Gonzalez; Mauren Roque	Guatemala (GUA); Kimberly Linares; Lucia Menendez; Stefany Figueroa
Trap	Alejandra Ramirez (MEX)	Cinthya Clemenz (MEX)	Adriana Ruano (GUA)

=== Mixed events ===
Event	Gold	Silver	Bronze
10m Air Rifle Team	Mexico (MEX); Gabriela Martínez; Edson Ramirez	Cuba (CUB); Reynier Estopiñán; Eglis de la Cruz	El Salvador (ESA); Ana Ramirez; Israel Gutierrez
10m Air Pistol Team	Cuba (CUB); Jorge Grau; Laina Pérez	El Salvador (ESA); Lilian Castro; Jorge Pimentel	Puerto Rico (PUR); Jennifer Valentin; Giovanni González

== Medal table ==
* Host nation (Colombia)

Rank	Nation	Gold	Silver	Bronze	Total
1	Mexico (MEX)	13	8	6	27
2	Cuba (CUB)	12	10	5	27
3	Guatemala (GUA)	7	6	11	24
4	Puerto Rico (PUR)	1	0	1	2
5	Colombia (COL)*	0	3	5	8
6	El Salvador (ESA)	0	3	1	4
7	Dominican Republic (DOM)	0	2	1	3
8	Venezuela (VEN)	0	1	1	2
9	Martinique (MTQ)	0	0	1	1
9	Panama (PAN)	0	0	1	1
Totals (10 entries)		33	33	33	99
