= Shooting at the 2014 Central American and Caribbean Games =

- Venue: El Lencero Police Academy
- Location: Veracruz, Mexico
- Dates: 15–24 November

The shooting competition at the 2014 Central American and Caribbean Games was held in Veracruz, Mexico.

The tournament was scheduled to be held from 15 to 24 November at the El Lencero Police Academy.

== Medal summary ==
=== Men's events ===
Event	Gold	Silver	Bronze
10m Air Pistol	Jorge Grau (CUB)	Maurilio Morales (MEX)	Roger Daniel (TRI)
10m Air Pistol team	Cuba (CUB); Jorge Grau; Elieser Mora; Guillermo Pais del Rio	Venezuela (VEN); Marcos Núñez; Felipe Beuvrín; Edilio Centeno	Guatemala (GUA); Jose Pablo Castillo; Romero Cruz; Sergio Sánchez
10m Air Rifle	Reynier Estopinan (CUB)	José Luis Sánchez (MEX)	Alvaro Sanchez (MEX)
10m Air Rifle team	Mexico (MEX); Jose Santos Valdes; José Luis Sánchez; Alvaro Sanchez	Venezuela (VEN); Julio Iemma; Raul Vargas; Martin Gutierrez	Cuba (CUB); Reynier Estopinan; Yoleisy Lois; Alexander Molerio
25m Rapid Fire Pistol	Leuris Pupo (CUB)	Douglas Gomez (VEN)	Jorge Álvarez (CUB)
25m Rapid Fire Pistol team	Cuba (CUB); Leuris Pupo; Jorge Álvarez; Juan Francisco Perez	Venezuela (VEN); Felipe Beuvrín; Douglas Gomez; Angel Gomez	Guatemala (GUA); Sergio Sánchez; Romeo Cruz; Marvin Herrera
25m Standard Pistol	Felipe Beuvrín (VEN)	Leuris Pupo (CUB)	Douglas Gomez (VEN)
25m Standard Pistol team	Venezuela (VEN); Felipe Beuvrín; Douglas Gomez; Edilio Centeno	Cuba (CUB); Leuris Pupo; Jorge Álvarez; Juan Francisco Perez	Guatemala (GUA); Marvin Herrera; Romeo Cruz; Sergio Sánchez
50m Pistol	Jorge Grau Portille (CUB)	Marcos Núñez (VEN)	Alex Peralta (COL)
50m Pistol team	Cuba; Jorge Grau Portille; Guillermo Pias Del Rio; Elieser Mora	Venezuela; Felipe Beuvrín; Edilio Centeno; Marcos Núñez	Guatemala; Jose Pablo Castillo; Marvin Herrera; Sergio Sánchez
50m Rifle Prone	Hosman Duran (DOM)	Yoleisy Lois (CUB)	Reynier Estopinan (CUB)
50m Rifle Prone team	Venezuela (VEN); Raul Vargas; Julio Iemma; Martin Gutierrez	Cuba (CUB); Reynier Estopinan; Yoleisy Lois; Rainier Quintanilla	Mexico (MEX); Luis Emilio Morales; José Luis Sánchez; Alvaro Sanchez
50m Rifle 3 Positions	Reynier Estopinan (CUB)	Luis Emilio Morales (MEX)	Julio Iemma (VEN)
50m Rifle 3 Positions team	Mexico (MEX); Luis Emilio Morales; José Luis Sánchez; Alvaro Sanchez	Cuba (CUB); Reynier Estopinan; Yoleisy Lois; Alexander Molerio	Venezuela (VEN); Julio Iemma; Raul Vargas; Martin Gutierrez
Trap	Jean Pierre Brol (GUA)	Eduardo Lorenzo (DOM)	Danilo Caro (COL)
Trap team	Dominican Republic (DOM); Sergio Piñero; Eduardo Lorenzo; Domingo Nicolás Lorenzo	Guatemala (GUA); Jean Pierre Brol; Hebert Brol; Dany Brol	Colombia (COL); Danilo Caro; Luis Alfredo Reyna; Hernando Vega
Double Trap	Hebert Brol (GUA)	Jose Ángel Torres (PUR)	Lucas Bennazar (PUR)
Double Trap team	Guatemala (GUA); Fernando Brol; Hebert Brol; Dany Brol	Puerto Rico (PUR); José Ángel Torres; Lucas Bennazar; Manuel Guzman	Dominican Republic (DOM); Sergio Piñero; Henry Tejeda; Elvin Rodgers
Skeet	Rodrigo Zachrisson (GUA)	Luis Arturo Bermudez (PUR)	Guillermo Torres (CUB)
Skeet team	Cuba (CUB); Juan Miguel Rodríguez; Guillermo Torres; Servando Puldón	Mexico (MEX); Luis Raúl Gallardo; Javier Rodríguez; Pablo Vargas	Venezuela (VEN); Victor Silva; Victor Silva Jr. Lucio Gomez

=== Women's events ===
Event	Gold	Silver	Bronze
10m Air Pistol	Alejandra Zavala (MEX)	Laina Pérez (CUB)	Amanda Mondol (COL)
10m Air Pistol team	Cuba (CUB); Laina Pérez; Sheyla Gonzalez; Claudia Hernandez	Mexico (MEX); Alejandra Zavala; Alejandra Cervantes; Mariana Castillo	Venezuela (VEN); Ivon Bucott; Maribel Pineda; Editzy Pimentel
10m Air Rifle	Eglis Yaima de la Cruz (CUB)	Ana Elizabeth Ramirez (ESA)	Linet Aguiar (CUB)
10m Air Rifle team	Mexico; Salma Ramos; Alexis Martínez; Andrea Palafox	El Salvador; Melissa Perez; Ana Elizabeth Ramirez; Johanna Pineda	Cuba; Eglis Yaima de la Cruz; Linet Aguiar; Dianelys Pérez
25m Pistol	Laina Pérez (CUB)	Maribel Pineda (VEN)	Amanda Mondol (COL)
25m Pistol team	Cuba (CUB); Laina Pérez; Claudia Hernandez; Sheyla Gonzalez	Venezuela (VEN); Maribel Pineda; Editzy Pimentel; Ivon Bucott	Guatemala (GUA); Delmi Cruz; Lucia Menendez; Geraldine Solorzano
50m Rifle 3 Positions	Eglis de la Cruz (CUB)	Diliana Méndez (VEN)	Dianelys Pérez (CUB)
50m Rifle 3 Positions team	Mexico (MEX); Andrea Palafox; Alexis Martínez; Nancy Leal	Guatemala (GUA); Diana Velasco; Maria Guerra; Polymaria Velasquez	El Salvador (ESA); Melissa Perez; Ana Elizabeth Ramirez; Johanna Pineda
50m Rifle Prone	Johanna Pineda (ESA)	Eglis de la Cruz (CUB)	Alexis Martínez (MEX)
50m Rifle Prone team	Mexico (MEX); Alexis Martínez; Andrea Palafox; Nancy Leal	Guatemala (GUA); Maria Guerra; Polymaria Velasquez; Diana Velasco	El Salvador (ESA); Johanna Pineda; Veronica Rivas; Melissa Perez
Trap	Ana La Torre (PUR)	Ana Waleska Soto (GUA)	Laura Robles (MEX)

== Medal table ==
* Host nation (Mexico)

Rank	Nation	Gold	Silver	Bronze	Total
1	Cuba (CUB)	14	7	7	28
2	Mexico (MEX)*	6	5	4	15
3	Guatemala (GUA)	4	4	5	13
4	Venezuela (VEN)	3	9	5	17
5	Dominican Republic (DOM)	2	1	1	4
6	Puerto Rico (PUR)	1	3	1	5
7	El Salvador (ESA)	1	2	2	5
8	Colombia (COL)	0	0	5	5
9	Trinidad and Tobago (TRI)	0	0	1	1
Totals (9 entries)		31	31	31	93
