= Shooting at the 2006 Central American and Caribbean Games =

- Location: Cartagena
- Dates: 15–30 July

The shooting competition at the 2006 Central American and Caribbean Games was held in Cartagena, Colombia. The tournament was scheduled to be held from 15 to 30 July 2006.

== Medal summary ==
=== Men's events ===
Event	Gold	Silver	Bronze
50m Pistol	Juan Olvera (MEX)	Hugo Hernandez (MEX)	Yulio Zorrilla (CUB)
50m Pistol Team	Venezuela; Felipe Beuvrín; Marcos Núñez; Frank Bonilla	Mexico; Juan Olvera; Carlos Martines; Hugo Hernandez	Cuba; Yulio Zorrilla; Norbelis Bárzaga; Jorge Álvarez
25m Rapid Fire Pistol	Leuris Pupo (CUB)	Juan Perez (CUB)	Howard Gomez (VEN)
25m Rapid Fire Pistol Team	Cuba; Lazaro Lorenzo; Leuris Pupo; Juan Perez	Colombia; Bernardo Tobar Prado; Jorge Peralta; Hernando Bulla	El Salvador; Antonio Aguilar; Carlos Hernández; Julio Molina
25m Center Fire Pistol	Felipe Beuvrín (VEN)	Julio Molina (ESA)	Moei Leon Roy Lie (SUR)
25m Center Fire Pistol Team	Venezuela; Felipe Beuvrín; Edilio Centeno; Giovanni Carnarata	El Salvador; Luis Nuila; Carlos Aguilar; Julio Molina	Puerto Rico; Maximino Rivera; Giovanni González; Nestor Pena
25m Standard Pistol	Leuris Pupo (CUB)	Roger Daniel (TRI)	Felipe Beuvrín (VEN)
25m Standard Pistol Team	Venezuela; Felipe Beuvrín; Douglas Gomez; Giovanni Carnarata	Cuba; Leuris Pupo; Lazaro Lorenzo; Juan Perez	Puerto Rico; Giovanni González; Nestor Pena; Maximino Rivera
10m Air Pistol	Hugo Hernandez (MEX)	Felipe Beuvrín (VEN)	Roger Daniel (TRI)
10m Air Pistol Team	Puerto Rico; Giovanni González; Nestor Pena; Maximino Rivera	Mexico; Hugo Hernandez; Juan Olvera; Antonio Tavarez	Venezuela; Felipe Beuvrín; Frank Bonilla; Marcos Núñez
50m Rifle Prone	Roberto Elias (MEX)	Blas Ruiz (MEX)	Anibal Perez (VEN)
50m Rifle Prone Team	Mexico; Roberto Elias; Blas Ruiz; Marcos Palafox	Venezuela; Anibal Perez; Julio Iemma Jr. Raul Vargas	Guatemala; Octavio Sandoval; Marlon Perez; Roberto Figueroa
50m Rifle 3 Positions	Roberto Elias (MEX)	Reinier Estopinan (CUB)	Octavio Sandoval (GUA)
50m Rifle 3 Positions Team	Mexico; Roberto Elias; Carlos Gonzalez; Blas Ruiz	Cuba; Reinier Estopinan; Eliécer Pérez; Maykel Guerra	Guatemala; Octavio Sandoval; Roberto Figueroa; Marlon Perez
10m Air Rifle	Roberto Elias (MEX)	Octavio Sandoval (GUA)	Blas Ruiz (MEX)
10m Air Rifle Team	Mexico; Roberto Elias; Blas Ruiz; Carlos Gonzalez	Cuba; Eliécer Pérez; Reinier Estopinan; Liuben Hernandez	Guatemala; Octavio Sandoval; Roberto Figueroa; Marlon Perez
Skeet	Juan Miguel Rodríguez (CUB)	Guillermo Torres (CUB)	Ariel Flores (MEX)
Skeet Team	Cuba; Juan Miguel Rodríguez; Guillermo Torres; Servando Puldón	Colombia; Diego Duarte; Carlos Solis; Vicente Velez	Puerto Rico; Luis Bermudez; Jesus Medero; Ediardo Gonzalez
Trap	Jorge Jaramillo (COL)	Hebert Brol (GUA)	Jean Brol (GUA)
Trap Team	Guatemala; Jean Brol; Hebert Brol; Dany Brol	Dominican Republic; William Escobar; Eduardo Lorenzo; Domingo Nicolás Lorenzo	Colombia; Jorge Jaramillo; Danilo Caro; Alex Cenuca
Double Trap	Elvin Rodgers (DOM)	Fernando Brol (GUA)	Patrick Martinez (PUR)
Double Trap Team	Dominican Republic; William Escobar; Henry Tejada; Elvin Rodgers	Puerto Rico; José Torres; Lucas Bennazar; Patrick Martinez	Guatemala; Hebert Brol; Carlos Weber; Fernando Brol

=== Women's events ===
Event	Gold	Silver	Bronze
10m Air Pistol	Laina Pérez (CUB)	Luisa Maida (ESA)	Alejandra Zavala (MEX)
10m Air Pistol Team	Mexico; Priscila Anton; Diana Ramirez; Alejandra Zavala	Cuba; Kirenia Bello; Maria Gomez; Laina Pérez	Colombia; Amanda Mondol; Adriana Rendón; Natalia Tobar
25m Pistol	Amanda Mondol (COL)	Editzy Pimentel (VEN)	Kirenia Bello (CUB)
10m Air Rifle	Alix Moncada (MEX)	Eglis Cruz (CUB)	Patricia Rivas (ESA)
10m Air Rifle Team	Mexico; Alix Moncada; Teresa Tellez; Andrea Palafox	Cuba; Eglis Cruz; Kenia Garcia; Delvis Hernandez	El Salvador; Patricia Rivas; Veronica Rivas; Melissa Perez
50m Rifle 3x20	Eglis Cruz (CUB)	Delvis Hernandez (CUB)	Pamela Lopez (GUA)
50m Rifle 3x20 Team	Cuba; Eglis Cruz; Delvis Hernandez; Dianelis Perez	El Salvador; Patricia Rivas; Veronica Rivas; Johanna Pineda	Mexico; Alix Moncada; Andrea Palafox; Martha de la Luna

== Medal table ==
* Host nation (Colombia)

Rank	Nation	Gold	Silver	Bronze	Total
1	Mexico	11	4	4	19
2	Cuba	8	10	3	21
3	Venezuela	4	3	4	11
4	Colombia*	2	2	2	6
5	Dominican Republic	2	1	0	3
6	Guatemala	1	3	7	11
7	Puerto Rico	1	1	4	6
8	El Salvador	0	4	3	7
9	Trinidad and Tobago	0	1	1	2
10	Suriname	0	0	1	1
Totals (10 entries)		29	29	29	87
