= Shooting at the 2003 Pan American Games =

This page shows the results of the Shooting sports competition at the 2003 Pan American Games, held from August 2 to August 9 in Santo Domingo, Dominican Republic.

== Men's competition ==
=== 50 m Pistol ===
- Held on 2003-08-05

RANK	FINAL RANKING	SCORE
Gold medal	Daryl Szarenski (USA)	658.1
Silver medal	Arseny Borrero (CUB)	639.3
Bronze medal	Norbelis Bárzaga (CUB)	637.9
4.	Stenio Yamamoto (BRA)	634.7
5.	Roger Daniel (TRI)	634.2
6.	Manuel Sánchez (CHI)	632.4
7.	Jason Turner (USA)	630.5
8.	Sergio Sánchez (GUA)	627.1

=== 25 m Rapid Fire Pistol ===
- Held on 2003-08-07

RANK	FINAL RANKING	SCORE
Gold medal	Leuris Pupo (CUB)	689.8
Silver medal	Juan Francisco Pérez (CUB)	678.1
Bronze medal	John McNally (USA)	671.2
4.	Metodi Igorov (CAN)	669.5
5.	John Bickar (USA)	669.0
6.	Daniel César Felizia (ARG)	666.3

=== 10 m Air Pistol ===
- Held on 2003-08-02

RANK	FINAL RANKING	SCORE
Gold medal	Jason Turner (USA)	675.6
Silver medal	Maximo Modesti (ARG)	674.2
Bronze medal	John Bickar (USA)	674.1
4.	Julio Molina (ESA)	670.1
5.	Sergio Sánchez (GUA)	669.9
6.	Hugo Hernández (MEX)	669.6
7.	Roger Daniel (TRI)	667.1
8.	Stenio Yamamoto (BRA)	664.7

=== 50 m Rifle 3 Positions ===
- Held on 2003-08-09

RANK	FINAL RANKING	SCORE
Gold medal	Jason Parker (USA)	1259.7
Silver medal	Eric Uptagrafft (USA)	1257.0
Bronze medal	Pablo Álvarez (ARG)	1234.8
4.	Eliécer Pérez (CUB)	1233.4
5.	Ángel Velarte (ARG)	1229.5
6.	Luiben Fran Hernández (CUB)	1229.0
7.	Roberto José Elias (MEX)	1228.8
8.	Michel Dion (CAN)	1217.5

=== 50 m Rifle Prone ===
- Held on 2003-08-07

RANK	FINAL RANKING	SCORE
Gold medal	Tom Tamas (USA)	697.4
Silver medal	Reinier Estpinan (CUB)	696.5
Bronze medal	Ken Johnson (USA)	695.4
4.	Sergio Ernesto Davila (GUA)	689.7
5.	Luiben Fran Hernández (CUB)	689.2
6.	Glynn Loftin (CAN)	687.9
7.	Ralph Rodríguez (PUR)	686.1
8.	Julio Iemma Hernández (VEN)	683.8

=== 10 m Air Rifle ===
- Held on 2003-08-04

RANK	FINAL RANKING	SCORE
Gold medal	Ángel Velarte (ARG)	692.5
Silver medal	Bradley Wheeldon (USA)	691.4
Bronze medal	Fabio Coelho (BRA)	685.7
4.	Roberto José Elias (MEX)	683.1
5.	Mauricio Huerta (CHI)	683.2
6.	Julio Iemma Hernández (VEN)	681.9
7.	José Carlos Arrais (BRA)	679.6
8.	Octavio Augusto Sandoval (GUA)	679.2

=== 50 m Running Target ===
- Held on 2003-08-08

RANK	FINAL RANKING	SCORE
Gold medal	William Johnson (USA)	671.5
Silver medal	Andrés Felipe Torres (COL)	668.3
Bronze medal	Armando Ayala (USA)	666.0
4.	Attila Solti (GUA)	663.9
5.	Cristian Berudez (GUA)	653.0
6.	Yunior Torres (CUB)	649.2

=== Trap ===
- Held on 2003-08-03

RANK	FINAL RANKING	SCORE
Gold medal	Lance Bade (USA)	147
Silver medal	Rodrigo Bastos (BRA)	145
Bronze medal	Danilo Caro (COL)	141
4.	Tye Bietz (CAN)	139
5.	Jean Pierre Brol (GUA)	138
6.	José Hugo Rodulfo (ARG)	134

=== Double Trap ===
- Held on 2003-08-06

RANK	FINAL RANKING	SCORE
Gold medal	Jeffrey Holguin (USA)	180
Silver medal	Bill Keever (USA)	176
Bronze medal	Lucas Bennazar (PUR)	165
4.	Elvin Rodgers (DOM)	163
5.	Garry Hill (CAN)	161
6.	Manuel Morales (DOM)	154

=== Skeet ===
- Held on 2003-08-09

RANK	FINAL RANKING	SCORE
Gold medal	Randy Sotowa (USA)	148+4
Silver medal	Guillermo Alfredo Torres (CUB)	148+3
Bronze medal	Diego Duarte (COL)	148+1
4.	Clayton Miller (CAN)	147
5.	Marco Matellini (PER)	145+6
6.	Julio Dujarric (DOM)	145+5

== Women's competition ==
=== 25 m Pistol ===
- Held on 2003-08-08

RANK	FINAL RANKING	SCORE
Gold medal	Sandra Uptagrafft (USA)	669.0
Silver medal	Margarita Tarradell (CUB)	669.0
Bronze medal	Natalia Tobar (COL)	667.0
4.	Avianna Chao (CAN)	666.8
5.	Lilia Pérez (CUB)	666.7
6.	Janine Bowman (USA)	666.6
7.	Ana Mello (BRA)	658.8
8.	Carmen Malo (ECU)	658.4

=== 10 m Air Pistol ===
- Held on 2003-08-03

RANK	FINAL RANKING	SCORE
Gold medal	Francis Gorrin (VEN)	477.1
Silver medal	Amanda Mondol (COL)	474.0
Bronze medal	Lynda Hare (CAN)	473.7
4.	Editzy Pimentel (VEN)	472.6
5.	Margarita Tarradell (CUB)	472.2
6.	Rebecca Snyder (USA)	470.0
7.	Luisa Maida (ESA)	467.6
8.	Janine Bowman (USA)	467.3

=== 50 m Rifle 3 Positions ===
- Held on 2003-08-06

RANK	FINAL RANKING	SCORE
Gold medal	Eglis Yaima Cruz (CUB)	668.5
Silver medal	Sarah Blakeslee (USA)	668.2
Bronze medal	Hattie Jean Ponti-Johnson (USA)	665.6
4.	Sharon Bowes (CAN)	662.0
5.	Patricia Rivas (ESA)	657.1
6.	Freddy Tejeda (DOM)	656.5
7.	Amelia Rosa Fournel (ARG)	654.6
8.	Mayid González (DOM)	646.9

=== 10 m Air Rifle ===
- Held on 2003-08-02

RANK	FINAL RANKING	SCORE
Gold medal	Eglis Yaima Cruz (CUB)	497.4
Silver medal	Melissa Mulloy (USA)	492.8
Bronze medal	Amelia Rosa Fournel (ARG)	492.5
4.	Teresa Telles (MEX)	491.2
5.	Cecilia Zeid (ARG)	490.9
6.	Sharon Bowes (CAN)	490.2
7.	Mary Elsass (USA)	490.1
8.	Dawn Kobayashi (JAM)	488.5

=== Trap ===
- Held on 2003-08-04

RANK	FINAL RANKING	SCORE
Gold medal	Whitly Loper (USA)	87
Silver medal	Cynthia Meyer (CAN)	84
Bronze medal	Janice Teixeira (BRA)	82
4.	Susan Nattrass (CAN)	79
5.	Vivian Rodriguez (PUR)	74

=== Double Trap ===
- Held on 2003-08-05

RANK	FINAL RANKING	SCORE
Gold medal	Kim Rhode (USA)	140
Silver medal	Cynthia Meyer (CAN)	133
Bronze medal	Susan Nattrass (CAN)	114
4.	Vivian Rodríguez (PUR)	86
5.	Janice Teixeira (BRA)	78

=== Skeet ===
- Held on 2003-08-07

RANK	FINAL RANKING	SCORE
Gold medal	Brandie Neal (USA)	93
Silver medal	Melisa Gil (ARG)	91
Bronze medal	Linda Conley (CAN)	91
4.	Kathia Michelle Dickson (DOM)	58

== Medal table ==
Place	Nation	Gold medal	Silver medal	Bronze medal	Total
1	United States	12	5	5	22
2	Cuba	3	5	1	9
3	Argentina	1	2	2	5
4	Venezuela	1	0	0	1
5	Canada	0	2	3	5
5	Colombia	0	2	3	5
7	Brazil	0	1	2	3
8	Puerto Rico	0	0	1	1
Total		17	17	17	51

== See also ==
- Shooting at the 2004 Summer Olympics
