= Shooting at the 2023 Central American and Caribbean Games =

- Venue: Polígono Estadio Jorge "El Mágico" González (Pistol and Rifle); Centro Olímpico Juan Pablo Duarte (Shotgun)
- Location: (El Salvador) San Salvador (Pistol and Rifle) (Dominican Republic) Santo Domingo (Shotgun)
- Dates: 25 June – 4 July (Pistol and Rifle); 4–7 July (Shootgun)

The shooting competition at the 2023 Central American and Caribbean Games was held at the Polígono Estadio Jorge "El Mágico" González, San Salvador, El Salvador from 25 June to 4 July. The skeet and trap competitions were held from 4 to 7 July at the Centro Olímpico Juan Pablo Duarte in Santo Domingo, Dominican Republic.

== Medal table ==
* Host nation (El Salvador)

| Rank | Nation | Gold | Silver | Bronze | Total |
|---|---|---|---|---|---|
| 1 | Mexico (MEX) | 12 | 7 | 5 | 24 |
| 2 | Cuba (CUB) | 5 | 5 | 5 | 15 |
| 3 | Centro Caribe Sports (CCS) | 4 | 6 | 6 | 16 |
| 4 | Puerto Rico (PUR) | 1 | 2 | 3 | 6 |
| 5 | Dominican Republic (DOM) | 1 | 2 | 1 | 4 |
| 6 | El Salvador (ESA)* | 1 | 0 | 0 | 1 |
| 7 | Barbados (BAR) | 0 | 1 | 0 | 1 |
| 7 | Colombia (COL) | 0 | 1 | 0 | 1 |
| 9 | Venezuela (VEN) | 0 | 0 | 3 | 3 |
| 10 | Guadeloupe (GLP) | 0 | 0 | 1 | 1 |
| Totals (10 entries) | | 24 | 24 | 24 | 72 |

== Medal summary ==
=== Men's events ===
| Event | Gold | Silver | Bronze |
|---|---|---|---|
| 10m air rifle | Edson Ramirez (MEX) | Donalson Munoz (CCS) | Julio Iemma (VEN) |
| 50m rifle 3 positions | Israel Gutiérrez (ESA) | Alexander Molerio (CUB) | Julio Iemma (VEN) |
| 10m air Rifle team | Mexico (MEX); Edson Ramirez; Carlos Quintero; Carlos Quezada | Centro Caribe Sports (CCS); Douglas Oliva; Donalson Muñoz; Allan Marquez | Puerto Rico (PUR); Gustavo Enriquez; Eyvin Lopez; Luis Mendoza |
| 50m Rifle team 3 positions | Mexico (MEX); Carlos Quintero; Carlos Quezada; Jose Sánchez | Cuba (CUB); Eddy Vázquez; Rainier Quintanilla; Alexander Molerio | Centro Caribe Sports (CCS); Douglas Oliva; Donalson Muñoz; Octavio Sandoval |
| 10m air pistol | Daniel Urquiza (MEX) | Juan Sebastián Rivera (COL) | Alejandro Delgado (CUB) |
| 25m rapid fire pistol | Jorge Alvarez (CUB) | Jorge Grau (CUB) | Fidencio Gonzalez (MEX) |
| 10m air pistol team | Cuba (CUB); Alejandro Delgado; Jorge Grau; Guillermo Pias | Mexico (MEX); Daniel Urquiza; Carlos González; Ricardo Valencia | Centro Caribe Sports (CCS); Donalson Muñoz; Octavio Sandoval; Douglas Oliva |
| 25m rapid fire pistol team | Cuba (CUB); Jorge Alvarez; Jorge Grau; Leuris Pupo | Centro Caribe Sports (CCS); Albino Jimenez; Jose Castillo; David Castillo | Puerto Rico (PUR); Luis Lopez; Michael Vega; Javier Medina |
| Trap | Eduardo Lorenzo (DOM) | Jorge Orozco (MEX) | Leonel Martinez (VEN) |
| Skeet | Sebastian Bermudez (CCS) | Rodrigo Zachrisson (CCS) | Maximo Tavarez (DOM) |
| Trap Team | Centro Caribe Sports (CCS); Carlos Hernandez; Jean Pierre Brol; Fernando Brol | Dominican Republic (DOM); David Yunes; Eduardo Lorenzo; Henry Tejeda | Mexico (MEX); Antonio Nayen; Jose Ramos; Jorge Orozco |
| Skeet Team | Centro Caribe Sports (CCS); Sebastian Bermudez; Carlos Padilla; Rodrigo Zachrisson | Dominican Republic (DOM); Felix Hermida; Julio Dujarric; Maximo Tavarez | Mexico (MEX); Carlos Segovia; Jesus Balboa; Luis Gallardo |

=== Women's events ===
| Event | Gold | Silver | Bronze |
|---|---|---|---|
| 10m air rifle | Elizabeth Nieves (MEX) | Yarimar Mercado (PUR) | Andrea Palafox (MEX) |
| 50m rifle 3 positions | Yarimar Mercado (PUR) | Dianelys Pérez (CUB) | Polymaria Alvarado (CCS) |
| 10m air Rifle team | Centro Caribe Sports (CCS); Tatiana Linares; Polymaria Alvarado; Jazmine Matta | Mexico (MEX); Michel Quezada; Andrea Palafox; Elizabeth Nieves | Cuba (CUB); Lisbet Hernandez; Dianelys Perez; Adianez Martinez |
| 50m Rifle team 3 positions | Cuba (CUB); Lisbet Hernández; Dianelys Pérez; Adianez Martínez | Mexico (MEX); Michel Quezada; Andrea Palafox; Elizabeth Nieves | Centro Caribe Sports (CCS); Polymaria Alvarado; Jazmine Matta; Lucia Menéndez |
| 10m air pistol | Andrea Ibarra (MEX) | Alejandra Zavala (MEX) | Laina Pérez (CUB) |
| 25m pistol | Laina Perez (CUB) | Alejandra Zavala (MEX) | Sheyla Gonzalez (CUB) |
| 10m air pistol team | Mexico (MEX); Andrea Ibarra; Alejandra Cervantes; Alejandra Zavala | Puerto Rico (PUR); Jennifer Valentin; Abigail Granell; Laura Acosta | Centro Caribe Sports (CCS); Tatiana Linares; Lucia Menendez; Stefany Figueroa |
| 25m pistol team | Mexico (MEX); Andrea Ibarra; Alejandra Cervantes; Alejandra Zavala | Cuba (CUB); Laina Perez; Sheyla Gonzalez; Claudia Hernandez | Centro Caribe Sports (CCS); Tatiana Linares; Lucia Menendez; Stefany Figueroa |
| Trap | Alejandra Ramirez (MEX) | Ana Soto (CCS) | Ingrid Moueza (GLP) |
| Skeet | Gabriela Rodriguez (MEX) | Michelle Elliot (BAR) | Anabel Molina (MEX) |

=== Mixed events ===
| Event | Gold | Silver | Bronze |
|---|---|---|---|
| 10m Air Rifle Team | Mexico (MEX); Andrea Palafox; Edson Ramirez | Centro Caribe Sports (CCS); Polymaria Alvarado; Douglas Oliva | Puerto Rico (PUR); Yarimar Mercado; Gustavo Enriquez |
| 10m Air pistol Team | Mexico (MEX); Andrea Ibarra; Carlos Gonzalez | Mexico (MEX); Alejandra Zavala; Daniel Urquiza | Cuba (CUB); Sheyla Gonzalez; Guillermo Pias |
