= Shooting at the 2011 Pan American Games – Men's skeet =

Shooting – Men's skeet at the 2011 Pan American Games
- Venue: Jalisco Hunting Club
- Dates: October 21–22
- Competitors: 28 from 16 nations

Medalists
Gold medal	Vincent Hancock	United States
Silver medal	Guillermo Torres	Cuba
Bronze medal	Juan Rodriguez	Cuba

The men's skeet shooting event at the 2011 Pan American Games was on October 21 and 22 at the Jalisco Hunting Club in Guadalajara. The defending Pan American Games champion is Vincent Hancock of the United States.

The event consisted of two rounds: a qualifier and a final. In the qualifier, each shooter fired 5 sets of 25 shots in skeet shooting.

The top 6 shooters in the qualifying round moved on to the final round. There, they fired one additional round of 25. The total score from all 150 shots was used to determine final ranking. Ties are broken using a shoot-off; additional shots are fired one pair at a time until there is no longer a tie.

== Schedule ==
All times are Central Standard Time (UTC-6).

Date	Time	Round
October 21, 2011	10:00	Qualification Day 1
October 22, 2011	10:00	Qualification Day 2
October 22, 2011	15:00	Final

== Records ==
The existing world and Pan American Games records were as follows.

Qualification records
World record	Vincent Hancock (USA); Tore Brovold (NOR); Mykola Milchev (UKR); Jan Sychra (CZE); Tore Brovold (NOR)	125	Lonato, Italy; Nicosia, Cyprus; Cairo, Egypt; Munich, Germany; Osijek, Croatia	June 14, 2007; July 13, 2008; May 9, 2009; May 20, 2009; July 25, 2009
Pan American record	James Graves (USA)	123	Rio de Janeiro, Brazil	July 20, 2007

Final records
World record	Vincent Hancock (USA); Tore Brovold (NOR); Tore Brovold (NOR); Jan Sychra (CZE)	150 (125+25)	Lonato, Italy; Nicosia, Cyprus; OsijekOsijek, Croatia; Concepción, Chile	June 14, 2007; July 13, 2008; July 25, 2009; March 7, 2011
Pan American record	Vincent Hancock (USA); James Graves (USA)	147 (122+25); 147 (123+24)	Rio de Janeiro, Brazil; Rio de Janeiro, Brazil	July 20, 2007; July 20, 2007

== Results ==
28 athletes from 16 countries competed.

=== Qualification ===
Rank	Athlete	Country	1	2	3	4	5	Total	Notes
1	Vincent Hancock	United States	25	24	25	25	23	122	Q
2	Guillermo Torres	Cuba	25	25	25	24	23	122	Q
3	Juan Rodriguez	Cuba	22	25	25	24	25	121	Q
4	Javier Rodríguez	Mexico	24	23	25	23	25	120	Q
5	Luis Bermúdez	Puerto Rico	24	24	22	24	25	119	Q
6	Michael Maskell	Barbados	22	24	24	25	23	118	Q, +6
7	Julio Dujarric	Dominican Republic	24	22	25	22	25	118	+5
8	Rodrigo Zachrisson	Guatemala	25	25	25	24	20	118	+5
9	Diego Duarte	Colombia	24	25	23	23	23	118	+3
10	Frank Thompson	United States	23	24	25	24	22	118	+3
11	Richard McBride	Canada	24	22	24	23	24	117	
12	Robert Auerbach	Trinidad and Tobago	24	24	22	23	24	117	
13	Jorge Atalah	Chile	25	24	25	24	19	117	
14	Wilson Junior	Brazil	25	24	24	20	23	116	
15	Carlos Valdez	Mexico	24	22	25	21	23	115	
16	Marco Matellini	Peru	22	22	24	21	25	114	
17	Juan Carlos Romero	Guatemala	24	21	24	23	22	114	
18	Nicolas Giha	Peru	22	25	18	25	23	113	
19	Julian Pena	Venezuela	22	25	24	22	20	113	
20	Eddy Paulino	Dominican Republic	21	23	21	24	23	112	
21	Federico Gil	Argentina	23	24	23	21	21	112	
22	Fernando Gazzotti	Argentina	22	22	22	23	22	111	
23	Raul Franco	Chile	24	23	23	21	20	111	
24	Jason Caswell	Canada	22	22	20	22	24	110	
25	Edison McLean	Cayman Islands	20	23	23	21	23	110	
26	Victor Silva	Venezuela	21	22	21	19	24	107	
27	Jesus Medero	Puerto Rico	24	23	20	21	19	107	
28	Jose Costa	Brazil	23	20	23	21	18	105	

=== Final ===
Rank	Athlete	Country	Qual	Final	Total	Notes
1st place, gold medalist(s)	Vincent Hancock	United States	122	25	147	EFPR
2nd place, silver medalist(s)	Guillermo Torres	Cuba	122	23	145	
3rd place, bronze medalist(s)	Juan Rodriguez	Cuba	121	21	142	
4	Michael Maskell	Barbados	118	23	141	
4	Luis Bermúdez	Puerto Rico	119	22	141	
4	Javier Rodríguez	Mexico	120	21	141	
