= Shooting at the 2015 Pan American Games =

- Shooting pictogram for the games
- Venue: Pan Am Shooting Centre
- Dates: July 12–19
- No. of events: 15 (9 men, 6 women)
- Competitors: 245 from 26 nations

Shooting competitions at the 2015 Pan American Games in Toronto were held from July 12 to 19 at the Toronto International Trap and Skeet Club (Pan Am Shooting Centre) in Innisfil. The competition was split into three disciplines, pistol, rifle and shotgun, which were further divided into different events. Men competed in nine events, with the women competing in six events for a total of 15 gold medals awarded.

The winners of all fifteen events, along with the runner up in the men's air rifle, skeet, trap and both women's rifle events would qualify for the 2016 Summer Olympics in Rio de Janeiro, Brazil (granted the athlete has not yet earned a quota for their country).

== Competition schedule ==
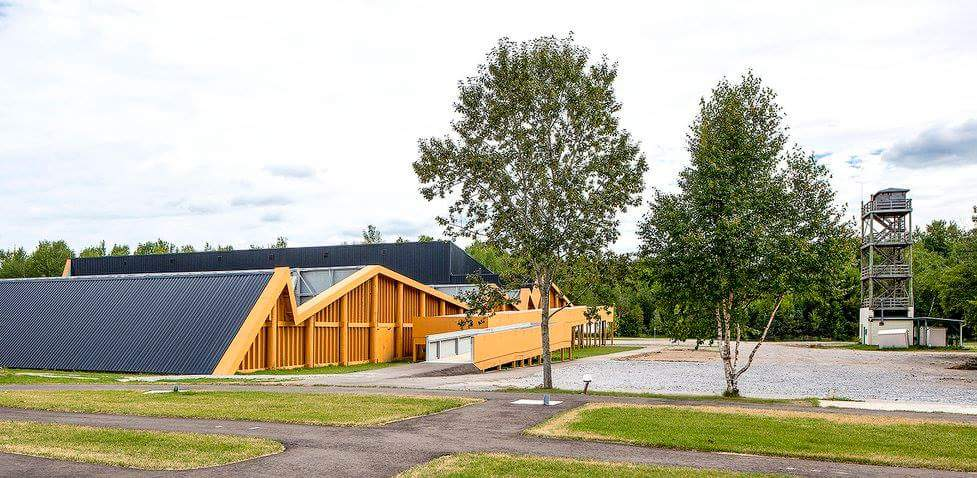
The Toronto International Trap and Skeet Club (Pan Am Shooting Centre), in Innisfil, Ontario, was the venue for the shooting competitions

The following is the competition schedule for the shooting competitions:

Q	Qualifications	F	Final

Event↓/Date →	Sun 12		Mon 13		Tue 14		Wed 15		Thu 16		Fri 17		Sat 18		Sun 19	
Pistol
Men's 10 m air pistol	Q	F														
Men's 25 m rapid fire pistol					Q		Q	F								
Men's 50 m pistol											Q	F				
Women's 10 m air pistol	Q	F														
Women's 25 m pistol					Q		F									
Rifle
Men's 10 m air rifle			Q	F												
Men's 50 m rifle prone											Q	F				
Men's 50 m rifle 3 positions															Q	F
Women's 10 m air rifle			Q	F												
Women's 50 m rifle 3 positions													Q	F		
Shotgun
Men's trap			Q		Q	F										
Men's double trap									Q	F						
Men's skeet													Q		Q	F
Women's trap			Q	F												
Women's skeet													Q	F		

== Medal table ==
* Host nation (Canada)

Rank	Nation	Gold	Silver	Bronze	Total
1	United States	4	6	3	13
2	Brazil	3	1	0	4
3	Canada*	3	0	1	4
4	Cuba	2	1	2	5
5	Mexico	1	1	1	3
6	Guatemala	1	0	1	2
6	Peru	1	0	1	2
8	Argentina	0	4	0	4
9	Venezuela	0	1	1	2
10	Dominican Republic	0	1	0	1
11	Chile	0	0	1	1
11	Colombia	0	0	1	1
11	Ecuador	0	0	1	1
11	El Salvador	0	0	1	1
11	Puerto Rico	0	0	1	1
Totals (15 entries)		15	15	15	45

== Medalists ==
=== Men's events ===
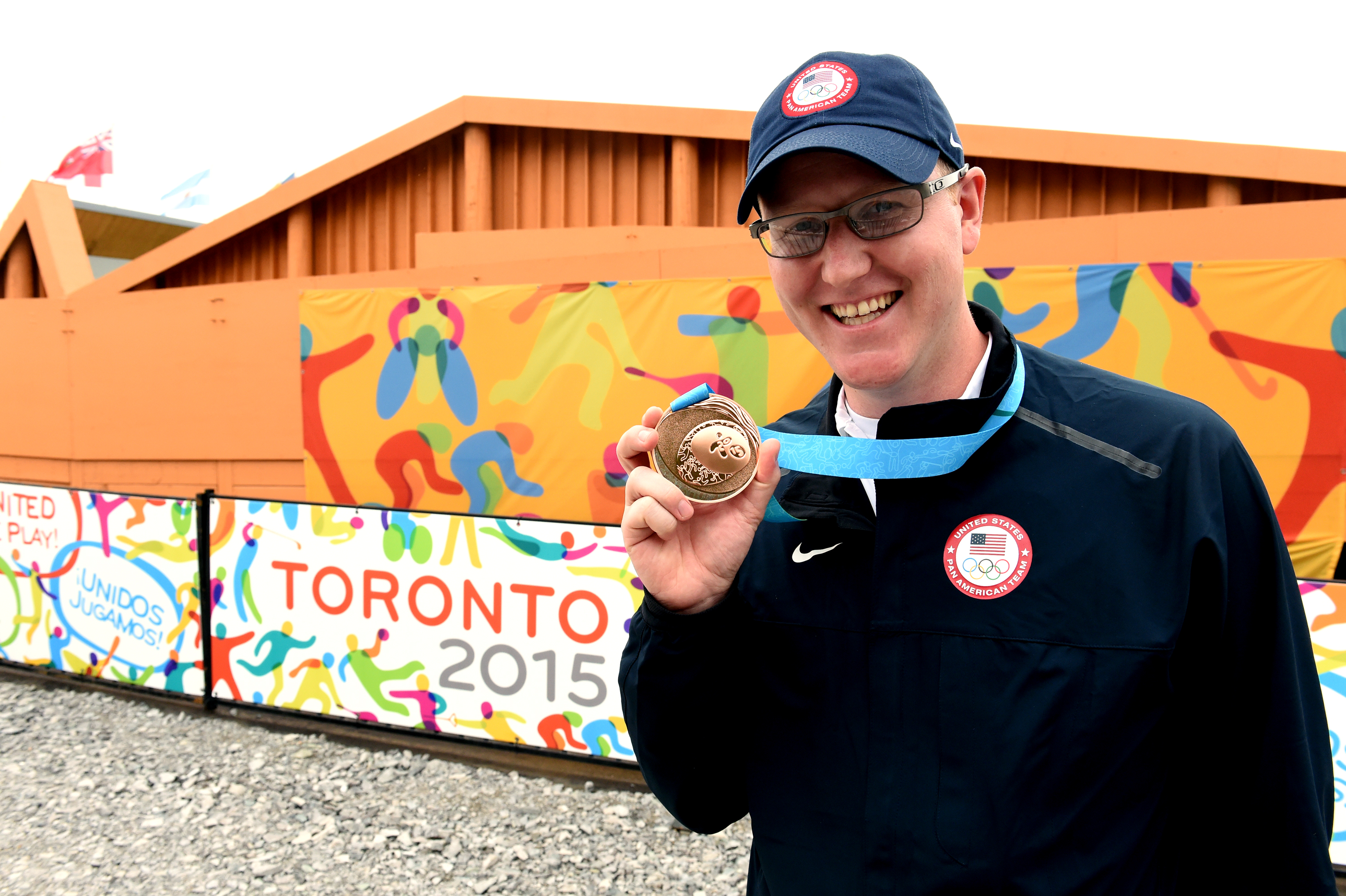
Bryant Wallizer of the United States holding the bronze medal he won in the men's 10 metre air rifle event

Event	Gold	Silver	Bronze
10 metre air pistol	Felipe Almeida Wu; Brazil	Jay Shi; United States	Mario Vinueza; Ecuador
25 metre rapid fire pistol	Brad Balsley; United States	Emerson Duarte; Brazil	Douglas Gomez; Venezuela
50 metre pistol	Júlio Almeida; Brazil	Jorge Grau; Cuba	Marko Carrillo; Peru
10 metre air rifle	Connor Davis; United States	Julio Iemma; Venezuela	Bryant Wallizer; United States
50 metre rifle prone	Cassio Rippel; Brazil	Michael McPhail; United States	Michel Dion; Canada
50 metre rifle three positions	Reinier Estpinan; Cuba	George Norton; United States	Ryan Anderson; United States
Trap	Francisco Boza; Peru	Fernando Borello; Argentina	Danilo Caro; Colombia
Double trap	Hebert Brol; Guatemala	Sergio Piñero; Dominican Republic	Enrique Brol; Guatemala
Skeet	Thomas Bayer; United States	Dustin Perry; United States	Juan Miguel Rodríguez; Cuba

=== Women's events ===
Event	Gold	Silver	Bronze
10 metre air pistol	Lynda Kiejko; Canada	Alejandra Zavala; Mexico	Lilian Castro; El Salvador
25 metre pistol	Lynda Kiejko; Canada	Sandra Uptagrafft; United States	Mariana Nava; Mexico
10 metre air rifle	Goretti Zumaya; Mexico	Fernanda Russo; Argentina	Eglis Yaima Cruz; Cuba
50 metre rifle three positions	Eglis Yaima Cruz; Cuba	Amelia Fournel; Argentina	Yarimar Mercado; Puerto Rico
Trap	Amanda Chudoba; Canada	Kayle Browning; United States	Kimberley Bowers; United States
Skeet	Kim Rhode; United States	Melisa Gil; Argentina	Francisca Crovetto; Chile

== Participating nations ==
A total of 26 countries qualified athletes. The number of athletes a nation entered is in parentheses beside the name of the country.

- Argentina (17)
- Barbados (2)
- Bolivia (6)
- Brazil (19)
- Canada (24)
- Chile (11)
- Colombia (6)
- Costa Rica (1)
- Cuba (16)
- Dominican Republic (10)
- Ecuador (7)
- El Salvador (9)
- Guatemala (21)
- Honduras (1)
- Jamaica (1)
- Mexico (18)
- Nicaragua (3)
- Panama (4)
- Paraguay (1)
- Peru (13)
- Puerto Rico (9)
- Trinidad and Tobago (3)
- United States (25)
- Uruguay (1)
- Venezuela (15)
- Virgin Islands (2)

== Qualification ==
A total of 250 sport shooters will qualify to compete at the games. The winner of each event at the 2014 South American Games and 2014 Central American and Caribbean Games will qualify for the Games. The remaining qualifying spots will be decided at the 2014 Pan American Shooting Championship. The host nation is guaranteed 15 athletes (one per event) and a further five wildcards will be awarded. A nation may enter a maximum of 25 athletes across all events.

== See also ==
- Shooting at the 2016 Summer Olympics
