= Eduardo Lorenzo =

Dominican Republic sport shooter

Personal information
- Full name: Eduardo José Lorenzo Casasnova
- Nationality: Dominican
- Born: 31 August 1966 (age 59) Santiago de los Caballeros
- Height: 1.71 m (5 ft 7 in)
- Weight: 84 kg (185 lb)

Sport
- Country: Dominican Republic
- Sport: Shooting
- Event(s): Trap, Double trap

Achievements and titles
- Olympic finals: 2016
Medal record
Representing the Dominican Republic
Men's shooting
Pan American Championships
Gold medal – first place	2014 Guadalajara	Trap
Silver medal – second place	2014 Guadalajara	Trap Team
Central American and Caribbean Games
Gold medal – first place	2010 Mayagüez	Trap Team
Gold medal – first place	2014 Veracruz	Trap Team
Gold medal – first place	2023 San Salvador	Trap
Silver medal – second place	2006 Cartagena	Trap Team
Silver medal – second place	2014 Veracruz	Trap
Silver medal – second place	2023 San Salvador	Trap Team
Silver medal – second place	2018 Barranquilla	Trap
Bronze medal – third place	2002 San Salvador	Trap Team
Silver medal – second place	2018 Barranquilla	Trap Team
Bolivarian Games
Bronze medal – third place	2013 Trujillo	Trap Team

Eduardo José Lorenzo Casasnova (born 31 August 1966) is a sports shooter who competed for the Dominican Republic in the 2016 Summer Olympics. He won the gold medal in the 2014 Pan American Championship in trap and the silver in trap team. He is also multimedalist in the Central American and Caribbean Games having won the gold medal in trap team in 2010 and 2014, silver in trap team in Trap Team and the 2014 trap competition and also the trap team bronze in 2002.

He competed in the 2005 and 2011 World Shotgun Championships and the 2014 ISSF World Championships and also the 2003, 2007, 2011 and 2015 Pan American Games.

== Early and personal life ==
Lorenzo was born Eduardo José Lorenzo Casasnova and is the son of the Olympic sport shooter Domingo Lorenzo Conde (now deceased), who competed in the 1968 and the 1972 Summer Olympics and Judith Casasnovas and brother of fellow team trap teammate Domingo Nicolás Lorenzo.

Lorenzo is 171 cm (5 ft 7 in) tall 84 kilograms (185 lb), born on 31 August 1966 in Santiago de los Caballeros. He started competing for the Dominican Republic in the 1986 Central American and Caribbean Games.

== Career ==
=== 2002-2010 ===
Lorenzo won the bronze medal in trap team with Nicolas Yunes and Eduardo Sella in the 2002 Central American and Caribbean Games; the team trap silver in Cargena de Indias, Colombia, in 2006 with William Escobar and Domingo Nicolás Lorenzo and the team trap gold in the 2010 Games. He competed in the 2003 Pan American Games ranking 13th and the 2007 edition ranking 15th. He competed in the 2005 World Shotgun Championships ending up in 38th place.

=== 2011-2014 ===
Lorenzo participated in the 2011 Pan American Games, being fifth in the qualifier and again fifth in the trap competition final round. He later participated in the 2011 World Shotgun Championships ranking in the 48th place.

In the 2013 Bolivarian Games held in Peru, Lorenzo won the bronze medal with Sergio Piñero and Domingo Nicolas Lorenzo in the Team trap competition.

In the 2014 Santo Domingo International Cup, Lorenzo won the trap gold medal helping his team to win the overall team competition. He later participated in the 2014 ISSF World Championships in Granada, Spain, ranking in the 59th place. The event served as a warm up for the Championship of the Americas. In the Championship of the Americas, Lorenzo booked his 2016 Summer Olympics berth when he won the gold medal in trap defeating the American Casey Wallace in the finals. He also won the trap silver medal along with Sergio Piñero and Domingo Nicolás Lorenzo being defeated by the American team for the competition championship, also booking three berths for the 2015 Pan American Games. He then traveled to Veracruz, Mexico to compete in the 2014 Central American and Caribbean Games winning the silver medal in trap and the gold in team trap along with Sergio Piñero and Domingo Nicolás Lorenzo.

=== 2015 ===
Lorenzo was awarded by the Guild of Sport Writers of Santiago de los Caballeros awarded his performance during 2014. He participated in the trap competition of the 2015 Pan American Games, ranking 16th in the qualification round. He served as the flag bearer for the Dominican Republic, when the designated flag bearer, boxer Juan Ramón Solano, was temporarily suspended before the Opening Ceremony.

=== 2016 ===
The Guild of Sport Writers of Santiago de los Caballeros, chose him for second year in a round as one of the awardees for his 2015 competition year.

Lorenzo traveled to Rio de Janeiro, Brazil as part of a 29 athletes representing the Dominican Republic in the 2016 Summer Olympics. As his father was an Olympian in 1968 and 1972, joined him as the first father-son couple representing the Dominican Republic in the Olympics. He confessed to arrived to the games in good shape thanks to his training seasons in Rome and Brazil.
