= Shooting at the 2015 Pan American Games – Men's skeet =

Shooting – Men's skeet at the 2015 Pan American Games
- Venue: Pan Am Shooting Centre
- Dates: July 18–19
- Competitors: 27 from 15 nations

Medalists
Gold medal	Thomas Bayer	United States
Silver medal	Dustin Perry	United States
Bronze medal	Juan Miguel Rodríguez	Cuba

The men's skeet shooting event at the 2015 Pan American Games was held between July 18 and 19 at Pan Am Shooting Centre in Innisfil.

The event consisted of three rounds: a qualifier, a semifinal and a medal round. In the qualifier, each shooter fired 5 sets of 25 shots in skeet shooting.

The top 6 shooters in the qualifying round moved on to the final round. There, they fired a round of 16 shoots. The top 2 qualified to dispute the golden medal, while the third and fourth place qualified to dispute the bronze medal.

The winners of all fifteen events, along with the runner up in the men's air rifle, skeet, trap and both women's rifle events qualified for the 2016 Summer Olympics in Rio de Janeiro, Brazil (granted the athlete has not yet earned a quota for their country).

== Schedule ==
Date	Time	Round
July 18, 2015	9:00	Qualification Day 1
July 19, 2015	9:00	Qualification Day 2
July 19, 2015	14:30	Semifinal
July 19, 2015	14:45	Finals

== Records ==
The existing world and Pan American Games records were as follows.

Qualification records
World record	Valerio Luchini (ITA); Vincent Hancock (USA); Georgios Achilleos (CYP)	125	Beijing, China; Acapulco, Mexico; Larnaca, Cyprus	July 9, 2014; March 9, 2015; April 27, 2015
Pan American record	James Graves (USA)	123	Rio de Janeiro, Brazil	July 20, 2007

== Results ==
=== Qualification round ===
Rank	Athlete	Country	1	2	3	4	5	Total	Shoot-off	Notes
1	Federico Gil	Argentina	25	24	25	24	23	121		Q
2	Luis Bermudez	Puerto Rico	24	24	23	24	25	120		Q
3	Thomas Bayer	United States	25	23	24	24	24	120		Q
4	Nicolás Pacheco	Peru	25	25	23	24	23	120		Q
5	Dustin Perry	United States	25	23	24	24	23	119	+2	Q
5	Juan Miguel Rodríguez	Cuba	24	25	23	24	23	119	+2	Q
7	Rodrigo Zachrisson	Guatemala	23	24	24	23	25	119	+1	
8	Juan Schaeffer	Guatemala	24	24	24	24	23	119	+1	
9	Piero Olivari	Chile	22	24	25	23	24	118		
10	Guillermo Alfredo Torres	Cuba	23	24	24	21	25	117		
11	Nicolas Giha	Peru	25	23	23	22	24	117		
12	Julio Dujarric	Dominican Republic	24	24	24	23	22	117		
13	Michael Maskell	Barbados	21	25	23	23	24	116		
14	Luis Gallardo	Mexico	21	25	24	22	24	116		
15	Fernando Gazzotti	Argentina	23	21	24	25	23	116		
16	Victor Silva	Venezuela	23	24	22	24	23	116		
17	Javier Rodríguez	Mexico	24	22	24	23	23	116		
18	Jorge Atalah	Chile	24	24	23	23	21	115		
19	Jonathan Weselake	Canada	22	23	25	23	21	114		
20	Jesus Medero	Puerto Rico	24	22	22	23	22	113		
21	David Mylnikov	Canada	21	23	22	23	23	112		
22	Lucio Gomez	Venezuela	22	20	22	23	23	110		
23	Renato Portela	Brazil	22	21	21	23	23	110		
24	Diego Duarte	Colombia	25	23	21	20	21	110		
25	Félix Hermida	Dominican Republic	24	21	24	21	20	110		
26	Andres Amador	El Salvador	17	15	18	17	20	87		
	Antonio Ferracuti	El Salvador						DNS		

=== Semifinal ===
Rank	Athlete	Country	Score	S-off	Notes
1	Thomas Bayer	United States	15		QG
1	Dustin Perry	United States	15		
3	Nicolás Pacheco	Peru	13		QB
3	Juan Miguel Rodríguez	Cuba	13		QB
5	Federico Gil	Argentina	12		
5	Luis Bermudez	Puerto Rico	12		

=== Finals ===
==== Bronze-medal match ====
Rank	Athlete	Country	Score	S-off	Notes
3rd place, bronze medalist(s)	Juan Miguel Rodríguez	Cuba	15	+4	
4	Nicolás Pacheco	Peru	15	+3	

==== Gold-medal match ====
Rank	Athlete	Country	Score	S-off	Notes
1st place, gold medalist(s)	Thomas Bayer	United States	16		
2nd place, silver medalist(s)	Dustin Perry	United States	14		
