= Shooting at the 2015 Pan American Games – Men's double trap =

Shooting – Men's double trap at the 2015 Pan American Games
- Venue: Pan Am Shooting Centre
- Dates: July 16
- Competitors: 19 from 11 nations

Medalists
Gold medal	Hebert Brol	Guatemala
Silver medal	Sergio Piñero	Dominican Republic
Bronze medal	Enrique Brol	Guatemala

The men's double trap shooting event at the 2015 Pan American Games was held on July 16 at Pan Am Shooting Centre in Innisfil.

The event consisted of three rounds: a qualifier, a semifinal and a medal round. In the qualifier, each shooter fired 5 sets of 30 shots in trap shooting. Shots were paired, with two targets being launched at a time.

The top 6 shooters in the qualifying round moved on to the semifinal. There, they fired one additional round of 30. The top 2 qualified to dispute the golden medal, while the third and fourth place qualified to dispute the bronze medal.. Ties are broken using a shoot-off; additional shots are fired one pair at a time until there is no longer a tie.

The winners of all fifteen events, along with the runner up in the men's air rifle, skeet, trap and both women's rifle events will qualify for the 2016 Summer Olympics in Rio de Janeiro, Brazil (granted the athlete has not yet earned a quota for their country).

== Schedule ==
Date	Time	Round
July 16, 2015	9:00	Qualification
July 16, 2015	15:30	Semifinal
July 16, 2015	16:00	Bronze-medal match
July 16, 2015	16:15	Golden Medal Match

== Records ==
The existing world and Pan American Games records were as follows.

Qualification records
World record	Tim Kneale (GBR)	148	Munich, Germany	June 9, 2014
Pan American record				

== Results ==
=== Qualification round ===
Rank	Athlete	Country	1	2	3	4	5	Total	Notes
1	Walton Eller	United States	28	27	23	27	28	133	Q, PR
2	Hebert Brol	Guatemala	26	28	27	25	27	133	Q, PR
3	Sergio Piñero	Dominican Republic	26	26	27	25	25	129	Q
4	Elvin Rodgers	Dominican Republic	25	27	26	27	23	128	Q
5	Enrique Brol	Guatemala	27	25	23	24	26	125	Q
6	Luiz Fernando Graça	Brazil	22	25	25	22	25	119	Q
7	Danilo Caro	Colombia	20	25	23	25	25	118	
8	Jaison Santin	Brazil	24	23	22	24	25	118	
9	Alessandro De Souza Ferreira	Peru	22	23	24	25	24	118	
10	Lucas Rafael Bennazar Ortiz	Puerto Rico	22	24	24	27	21	118	
11	Ricardo Cortina	Venezuela	20	22	24	25	25	116	
12	Kabir Dhillon	Canada	22	24	23	21	19	109	
13	Paulo Reichardt	Paraguay	21	21	19	23	24	108	
14	José Torres Laboy	Puerto Rico	20	21	23	19	22	105	
15	Hernando Vega	Colombia	24	20	18	20	21	103	
16	Eduardo Taylor	Panama	23	20	18	21	20	102	
17	Paul Shaw	Canada	23	18	19	22	19	101	
18	Mario Díaz	Peru	19	20	23	14	15	91	
19	Manuel García	Panama	14	13	18	19	19	83	

=== Semifinal ===
Rank	Athlete	Country	Score	S-off	Notes
1	Sergio Piñero	Dominican Republic	28		QG
2	Hebert Brol	Guatemala	27		QG
3	Enrique Brol	Guatemala	26	+10	QB
3	Walton Eller	United States	26	+10	QB
5	Luiz Fernando Graça	Brazil	26	+9	
6	Elvin Rodgers	Dominican Republic	23		

=== Final ===
==== Bronze-medal match ====
Rank	Athlete	Country	Score	S-off	Notes
3rd place, bronze medalist(s)	Enrique Brol	Guatemala	29		
4	Walton Eller	United States	26		

==== Gold-medal match ====
Rank	Athlete	Country	Score	S-off	Notes
1st place, gold medalist(s)	Hebert Brol	Guatemala	27		
2nd place, silver medalist(s)	Sergio Piñero	Dominican Republic	26		
