= Shooting at the 2011 Pan American Games – Women's 50 metre rifle three positions =

Shooting – Women's 50 metre rifle three positions at the 2011 Pan American Games
- Venue: Jalisco Hunting Club
- Dates: October 22
- Competitors: 24 from 14 nations

Medalists
| Gold medal | Dianelys Pérez | Cuba |
| Silver medal | Eglys De La Cruz | Cuba |
| Bronze medal | Sarah Beard | United States |

The women's 50 metre rifle three positions shooting event at the 2011 Pan American Games was held on October 22 at the Jalisco Hunting Club in Guadalajara. The defending Pan American Games champion is Jamie Beyerle of the United States.

The event consisted of two rounds: a qualifier and a final. In the qualifier, each shooter fired 60 shots with a .22 Long Rifle at 50 metres distance. 20 shots were fired each from the standing, kneeling, and prone positions. Scores for each shot were in increments of 1, with a maximum score of 10.

The top 8 shooters in the qualifying round moved on to the final round. There, they fired an additional 10 shots, all from the standing position. These shots scored in increments of .1, with a maximum score of 10.9. The total score from all 70 shots was used to determine final ranking.

== Schedule ==
All times are Central Standard Time (UTC−6).

| Date | Time | Round |
|---|---|---|
| October 22, 2011 | 9:00 | Qualification |
| October 22, 2011 | 13:00 | Final |

== Records ==
The existing world and Pan American Games records were as follows.

Qualification records
| World record | Sonja Pfeilschifter (GER) | 594 | Munich, Germany | May 28, 2006 |
| Pan American record | Debra Sinclair (USA) | 584 | Havana, Cuba | August 6, 1991 |

Final records
| World record | Sonja Pfeilschifter (GER) | 698.0 (594+104.0) | Munich, Germany | May 28, 2006 |
| Pan American record | Debra Sinclair (USA) | 680.6 (584+96.6) | Havana, Cuba | August 6, 1991 |

== Results ==
=== Qualification round ===
24 athletes from 14 countries competed.

| Rank | Athlete | Country | Prone | Stand | Kneel | Total | Notes |
|---|---|---|---|---|---|---|---|
| 1 | Dianelys Pérez | Cuba | 195 | 191 | 190 | 576 | Q |
| 2 | Sarah Beard | United States | 195 | 188 | 188 | 571 | Q |
| 3 | Eglys De La Cruz | Cuba | 197 | 187 | 187 | 571 | Q |
| 4 | Cecilia Zeid | Argentina | 199 | 177 | 193 | 569 | Q |
| 5 | Diliana Méndez | Venezuela | 196 | 185 | 187 | 568 | Q |
| 6 | Johana Pineda | El Salvador | 195 | 184 | 188 | 567 | Q |
| 7 | Alexis Gabriela Martínez | Mexico | 193 | 188 | 186 | 567 | Q |
| 8 | Amy Bock | Puerto Rico | 196 | 184 | 186 | 566 | Q |
| 9 | Veronica Rivas | El Salvador | 195 | 184 | 186 | 565 | |
| 10 | Amelia Fournel | Argentina | 192 | 186 | 187 | 565 | |
| 11 | Gabriela Lobos | Chile | 195 | 178 | 190 | 563 | |
| 12 | Lidnimar Rebolledo | Venezuela | 197 | 177 | 188 | 562 | |
| 13 | Sharon Bowes | Canada | 195 | 176 | 191 | 562 | |
| 14 | Edna Monzon | Guatemala | 193 | 182 | 186 | 561 | |
| 15 | Diana Velasco | Guatemala | 195 | 180 | 185 | 560 | |
| 16 | Karina Vera | Chile | 195 | 179 | 186 | 560 | |
| 17 | Monica Fyfe | Canada | 192 | 183 | 185 | 560 | |
| 18 | Karina Rodríguez | Peru | 196 | 178 | 185 | 559 | |
| 19 | Cesar Renato Yui | Brazil | 194 | 181 | 184 | 559 | |
| 20 | Sofia Elena Corti | Mexico | 193 | 181 | 179 | 553 | |
| 21 | Rosane Ewald | Brazil | 193 | 175 | 182 | 550 | |
| 22 | Maziel Gonzalez | Dominican Republic | 195 | 165 | 179 | 539 | |
| 23 | Sara Vizcarra | Peru | 189 | 173 | 177 | 539 | |
| 24 | Wendy Palomeque | Bolivia | 194 | 169 | 175 | 538 | |

=== Final ===
| Rank | Athlete | Qual | 1 | 2 | 3 | 4 | 5 | 6 | 7 | 8 | 9 | 10 | Final | Total | Notes |
|---|---|---|---|---|---|---|---|---|---|---|---|---|---|---|---|
| 1st place, gold medalist(s) | Dianelys Pérez (CUB) | 576 | 9.5 | 10.3 | 10.5 | 9.5 | 10.1 | 8.9 | 8.8 | 10.6 | 9.8 | 7.6 | 95.6 | 671.6 | |
| 2nd place, silver medalist(s) | Eglys De La Cruz (CUB) | 571 | 10.3 | 9.3 | 8.7 | 10.1 | 10.5 | 10.3 | 10.2 | 10.3 | 9.7 | 9.9 | 99.3 | 670.3 | |
| 3rd place, bronze medalist(s) | Sarah Beard (USA) | 571 | 8.9 | 10.3 | 9.2 | 9.4 | 10.4 | 10.2 | 9.3 | 9.5 | 10.2 | 9.0 | 96.4 | 667.4 | |
| 4 | Alexis Gabriela Martínez (MEX) | 567 | 9.4 | 10.4 | 10.0 | 10.5 | 9.5 | 9.6 | 9.4 | 9.8 | 9.6 | 9.2 | 97.4 | 664.4 | |
| 5 | Johana Pineda (ESA) | 567 | 9.7 | 10.1 | 9.1 | 9.9 | 9.1 | 9.3 | 10.3 | 9.3 | 9.5 | 9.3 | 95.6 | 662.6 | |
| 6 | Amy Bock (PUR) | 566 | 9.0 | 10.6 | 8.3 | 7.5 | 9.2 | 8.3 | 8.9 | 10.2 | 10.6 | 10.5 | 93.1 | 659.1 | |
| 7 | Diliana Méndez (VEN) | 568 | 8.3 | 8.3 | 8.8 | 10.2 | 8.0 | 9.3 | 10.4 | 8.8 | 10.2 | 8.8 | 91.1 | 659.1 | |
| 8 | Cecilia Zeid (ARG) | 569 | 10.6 | 9.4 | 6.7 | 9.7 | 10.1 | 9.6 | 8.8 | 9.1 | 4.9 | 8.3 | 87.2 | 656.2 | |
