= Shooting at the 2015 Pan American Games – Men's trap =

Shooting – Men's trap at the 2015 Pan American Games
- Venue: Pan Am Shooting Centre
- Dates: July 13–14
- Competitors: 30 from 17 nations

Medalists
Gold medal	Francisco Boza	Peru
Silver medal	Fernando Borello	Argentina
Bronze medal	Danilo Caro	Colombia

The men's trap shooting event at the 2015 Pan American Games will be held between the 13 and 14 of July at the Pan Am Shooting Centre in Innisfil.

The event consisted of two rounds: a qualifier and a final. In the qualifier, each shooter fired 5 sets of 25 shots in trap shooting.

The top 6 shooters in the qualifying round moved on to the final round. There, they fired one additional round of 25. The total score from all 150 shots was used to determine final ranking. Ties are broken using a shoot-off; additional shots are fired one pair at a time until there is no longer a tie.

The winners of all fifteen events, along with the runner up in the men's air rifle, skeet, trap and both women's rifle events will qualify for the 2016 Summer Olympics in Rio de Janeiro, Brazil (granted the athlete has not yet earned a quota for their country).

== Schedule ==
All times are Central Standard Time (UTC-6).

Date	Time	Round
July 13, 2015	9:00	Qualification Day 1
July 14, 2015	9:00	Qualification Day 2
July 14, 2015	14:30	Semifinal
July 14, 2015	15:00	Finals

== Results ==
=== Qualification round ===
Rank	Athlete	Country	1	2	3	4	5	Total	Notes
1	Danilo Caro	Colombia	22	24	23	24	24	117	Q
2	Domingo Nicolás Lorenzo	Dominican Republic	24	21	23	24	24	116	Q
3	Francisco Boza	Peru	23	22	24	23	24	116	Q
4	Fernando Borello	Argentina	24	20	23	24	23	114	Q
5	Drew Shaw	Canada	21	24	24	22	23	114	Q
6	Curtis Wennberg	Canada	22	23	22	22	24	113	Q
7	Alessandro de Souza	Peru	24	21	22	23	22	112	
8	Casey Wallace	United States	20	24	23	23	21	111	
9	Myles Walker	United States	22	25	20	23	21	111	
10	Ricardo Cortina	Venezuela	20	23	24	22	21	110	
11	Leonel Martínez	Venezuela	22	22	22	23	20	109	
12	Jean Pierre Brol	Guatemala	18	25	19	23	23	108	
13	Rodrigo Bastos	Brazil	22	23	19	19	22	105	
14	Eduardo Correa	Brazil	22	21	20	21	21	105	
15	Juan Zanella	Mexico	23	22	19	17	22	103	
16	Eduardo Lorenzo	Dominican Republic	22	21	20	21	19	103	
17	Dany Brol	Guatemala	20	23	20	20	17	100	
18	Claudio Vergara	Chile	20	17	21	20	21	99	
19	Pedro Gutiérrez	Colombia	19	23	22	13	21	98	
20	Ramon Toca	Mexico	21	20	17	20	20	98	
21	César Menacho	Bolivia	23	19	20	20	16	98	
22	Lucas Rafael Bennazar Ortiz	Puerto Rico	17	22	20	22	16	97	
23	Carlos Bellettini	Argentina	19	20	16	19	22	96	
24	Paulo Reichardt	Paraguay	17	21	18	19	20	95	
25	Eduardo Taylor	Panama	20	19	19	18	18	94	
26	Manuel Garcia	Panama	17	20	16	15	16	84	
27	Marcelo Arana	Bolivia	21	15	13	15	14	78	
28	Anthony Maraj	Trinidad and Tobago	18	5	13	20	16	72	
29	Antonio Ferracuti	El Salvador	10	11	12	11	10	54	
	Andres Amador	El Salvador						DNS	

=== Semifinal ===
Rank	Athlete	Country	Result	Shoot-off	Notes
1	Francisco Boza	Peru	13		QG
2	Fernando Borello	Argentina	11		QG
3	Curtis Wennberg	Canada	10	+1+1	QB
4	Danilo Caro	Colombia	10	+1+0+1	QB
5	Drew Shaw	Canada	10	+1+0+0	
6	Domingo Nicolás Lorenzo	Dominican Republic	9		

=== Finals ===
==== Bronze-medal match ====
Rank	Athlete	Country	Result	Shoot-off	Notes
3rd place, bronze medalist(s)	Danilo Caro	Colombia	13		
4	Curtis Wennberg	Canada	11		

==== Gold-medal match ====
Rank	Athlete	Country	Result	Shoot-off	Notes
1st place, gold medalist(s)	Francisco Boza	Peru	11		
2nd place, silver medalist(s)	Fernando Borello	Argentina	10		
