= Shooting at the 2010 Central American and Caribbean Games =

- Location: Mayagüez
- Dates: 18–25 July

The shooting competition at the 2010 Central American and Caribbean Games was held in Mayagüez, Puerto Rico.

The tournament was scheduled to be held from 18 to 25 July at the Albergue Olimpico in Salinas.

== Medal summary ==
=== Men's events ===
Event	Gold		Silver		Bronze	
10m Air Pistol	Hugo Hernandez (MEX)	668.1	Giovanny González (PUR)	667.5	Marco Nuñez (VEN)	661.3
10m Air Pistol team	Mexico	1691	Puerto Rico	1688	Venezuela	1679
10m Air Rifle	Blas Ruiz; Mexico	687.1	Jose Luis Sanches; Mexico	685.6	Octavio Sandoval; Guatemala	684.6
10m Air Rifle team	Mexico	1750	Puerto Rico	1729	El Salvador	1726
25m Rapid Fire Pistol	Sergio Sánchez; Guatemala	742.4	Douglas Gomez; Venezuela	733.1	Felipe Beuvrín; Venezuela	730.8
25m Standard Pistol	Roger Daniel; Trinidad and Tobago	565	Franco di Mauro; Venezuela	560	Sergio Sánchez; Guatemala	558
25m Standard Pistol team	Venezuela	1644	Mexico	1631	El Salvador	1609
25m Center Fire Pistol	Julio Tirso Molina; El Salvador	575	Felipe Beuvrín; Venezuela	566	Nestor Peña; Puerto Rico	565
25m Center Fire Pistol team	El Salvador	1689	Venezuela	1668	Puerto Rico	1663
50m Rifle Prone	Alexander Rivera; Puerto Rico	694.6	Octavio Sandoval; Guatemala	694.1	Ross Roberts; Bermuda	693.1
50m Rifle Prone team	Venezuela	1753	Mexico	1741	Trinidad and Tobago	1736
50m Pistol	Hugo Hernandez; Mexico	641.2	Marco Nuñez; Venezuela	637.3	Roger Daniel; Trinidad and Tobago	634.3
50m Pistol team	Mexico	1611	Venezuela	159	Barbados	1530
50m Rifle 3 Positions	Blas Ruiz; Mexico	1241.6	Julio Iemma; Venezuela	1240.9	Jose Luis Sanches; Mexico	1235.9
Trap	Sergio Piñero; Dominican Republic	141	Jean Pierre Brol; Guatemala	138	Nicolas Tordecilla; Colombia	137
Trap team	Dominican Republic; Sergio Piñero; William Escobar; Eduardo Lorenzo	343	Guatemala; Dany Brol; Jean Pierre Brol; Álvaro Rodríguez	331	Colombia; Danilo Caro; Nicolás Tordecilla; Andrés Victoria	326
Double Trap	Lucas Bennazar; Puerto Rico	177	Henry Tejeda; Dominican Republic	175	Sergio Piñero; Dominican Republic	173
Double Trap team	Dominican Republic; Sergio Piñero; Elvin Rodgers; Henry Tejeda	395	Puerto Rico; Lucas Bennazar; Patrik Martínez; José Torres	382	Guatemala; Fernando Brol; Hebert Brol; Carlos Wever	372
Skeet	Robert John Auerbach; Trinidad and Tobago	144	Carlos Valdez; Mexico	142	Diego Duarte; Colombia	141
Skeet team	Mexico; Ariel Mauricio Flores; Javier Rodríguez; Carlos Valdez	345	Guatemala; Juan Romero; Juan Schaeffer; Rodrigo Zachrisson	341	Dominican Republic; Julio Elizardo Dujarric; Julio Manuel Dujarric; Eddy Paulino	338

=== Women's events ===
Event	Gold		Silver		Bronze	
10m Air Pistol	Alejandra Zavala; Mexico	480.5	Maribel Pineda; Venezuela	470.3	Delmi Cruz; Guatemala	469.1
10m Air Pistol team	Mexico	1118	Colombia	1104	Venezuela	1098
10m Air Rifle	Rosa Peña; Mexico	499.3	Gabriela Martínez; Mexico	492.7	Melissa Pérez; El Salvador	491.7
10m Air Rifle team	El Salvador	1167	Mexico	1163	Venezuela	1149
25m Pistol	Maribel Pineda; Venezuela	773.5	Amanda Mondol; Colombia	765.2	Nathalia Tobar; Colombia	764.5
25m Pistol team	Colombia		Venezuela		Dominican Republic	
Trap	Vivian Rodríguez; Puerto Rico	70	Ana Latorre; Puerto Rico	69+1	Deborah Feliciano; Puerto Rico	69+0
50m Rifle 3 Positions	Gabriela Martínez; Mexico	679.6	Diliana Méndez; Venezuela	670.1	Diana Velasco; Guatemala	663.6
50m Rifle 3 Positions team	Mexico	1704	El Salvador		Venezuela	
50m Rifle Prone	Elizabeth Noguera; Venezuela	589	Marlil Romero; Venezuela	583	Diliana Méndez; Venezuela	583
50m Rifle Prone team	Venezuela	1755	Guatemala	1744	Mexico	1736
