= Enrique Brol =

Guatemalan sports shooter

Personal information
- Born: 9 October 1978 (age 47) Guatemala City, Guatemala

Sport
- Sport: Sports shooting
Medal record
Representing Guatemala
Pan American Games
Bronze medal – third place	2015 Toronto	Double trap
Central American and Caribbean Games
Gold medal – first place	2014 Veracruz	Double trap team
Silver medal – second place	2006 Cartagena	Double trap
Bronze medal – third place	1998 Maracaribo	Trap team
Bronze medal – third place	2006 Cartagena	Double trap team
Bronze medal – third place	2010 Mayaguez	Double trap team

Enrique Brol (born 9 October 1978) is a Guatemalan sports shooter. He competed in the men's double trap event at the 2016 Summer Olympics.
