= Shooting at the 2010 South American Games – Men's trap =

The Men's trap event at the 2010 South American Games was held on March 22 and March 23 at 9:00.

== Individual ==
=== Medalists ===
Gold	Silver	Bronze
Nicolas David Guerra; Colombia	Carlos Costa; Brazil	Hugo Jose Rodulfo; Argentina

=== Results ===
==== Qualification ====
Rank	Athlete	Series					Total	Shoot-off
Rank	Athlete	1	2	3	4	5	Total	Shoot-off
1	Nicolas David Guerra (COL)	25	20	24	24	25	118	
2	Fernando Borrello (ARG)	23	23	25	23	23	117	
3	Hugo Jose Rodulfo (ARG)	25	23	21	22	25	116	
4	Carlos Costa (BRA)	23	23	23	24	23	116	
5	Danilo Caro (COL)	22	23	24	23	23	115	
6	Eduardo Correa (BRA)	24	21	25	23	22	115	
7	Francisco Juan Dibos (PER)	21	22	23	21	25	112	
8	Ruben Eduardo Ulloa (CHI)	22	23	22	23	21	111	
9	Juan Carlos Gacha (BOL)	23	23	21	21	22	110	
10	Cesar David Flores (BOL)	23	19	20	23	24	109	
11	Claudio Antonio Bernabe (CHI)	22	21	21	22	23	109	
12	Mario Sorez (VEN)	20	21	24	21	21	107	
13	Leonel Martinez (VEN)	19	23	21	18	23	104	
14	Alessandro Alberto Berisso (PER)	17	19	22	17	21	96	
15	Michel Daou (AHO)	16	21	18	17	19	91	

==== Final ====
Rank	Athlete	Qual Score	Final Score	Total	Shoot-off
1st place, gold medalist(s)	Nicolas David Guerra (COL)	118	21	139	1
2nd place, silver medalist(s)	Carlos Costa (BRA)	116	23	139	0
3rd place, bronze medalist(s)	Hugo Jose Rodulfo (ARG)	116	20	136	1
4	Fernando Borrello (ARG)	117	19	136	0
5	Eduardo Correa (BRA)	115	19	134	1
6	Danilo Caro (COL)	115	19	134	0

== Team ==
=== Medalists ===
Gold	Silver	Bronze
Nicolas David Guerra; Danilo Caro; Colombia	Fernando Borrello; Hugo Jose Rodulfo; Argentina	Carlos Costa; Eduardo Correa; Brazil

=== Results ===
Rank	Athlete	Series					Total
Rank	Athlete	1	2	3	4	5	Total
1st place, gold medalist(s)	Colombia						233
1st place, gold medalist(s)	Nicolas David Guerra (COL)	25	20	24	24	25	118
1st place, gold medalist(s)	Danilo Caro (COL)	22	23	24	23	23	115
2nd place, silver medalist(s)	Argentina						233
2nd place, silver medalist(s)	Fernando Borrello (ARG)	23	23	25	23	23	117
2nd place, silver medalist(s)	Hugo Jose Rodulfo (ARG)	25	23	21	22	25	116
3rd place, bronze medalist(s)	Brazil						231
3rd place, bronze medalist(s)	Carlos Costa (BRA)	23	23	23	24	23	116
3rd place, bronze medalist(s)	Eduardo Correa (BRA)	24	21	25	23	22	115
4	Chile						220
4	Ruben Eduardo Ulloa (CHI)	22	23	22	23	21	111
4	Claudio Antonio Bernabe (CHI)	22	21	21	22	23	109
5	Bolivia						219
5	Juan Carlos Gacha (BOL)	23	23	21	21	22	110
5	Cesar David Flores (BOL)	23	19	20	23	24	109
6	Venezuela						211
6	Mario Sorez (VEN)	20	21	24	21	21	107
6	Leonel Martinez (VEN)	19	23	21	18	23	104
7	Peru						208
7	Francisco Juan Dibos (PER)	21	22	23	21	25	112
7	Alessandro Alberto Berisso (PER)	17	19	22	17	21	96
