= Arseny Borrero =

Cuban sport shooter (born 1979)

Personal information
- Full name: Arseny Borrero
- Nationality: Cuba
- Born: 29 October 1979 (age 46) Havana, Cuba
- Height: 1.77 m (5 ft 9 1/2 in)
- Weight: 87 kg (192 lb)

Sport
- Sport: Shooting
- Event(s): 10 m air pistol (AP60); 50 m pistol (FP)
- Club: Ciudad de Habana
- Coached by: Narciso López
Medal record
Men's shooting
Representing Cuba
Pan American Games
Silver medal – second place	2003 Santo Domingo	FP

Arseny Borrero (born October 29, 1979, in Havana) is a Cuban sport shooter. He earned a silver medal in the men's free pistol at the 2003 Pan American Games in Santo Domingo, Dominican Republic, and was selected to compete for the Cuban squad at the 2004 Summer Olympics, finishing fortieth in the process. Throughout his sporting career, Borrero trained as a member of the shooting team for Havana City Sport Club under his personal coach Narciso López.

Borrero burst into the shooting scene at the 2003 Pan American Games in Santo Domingo, Dominican Republic, where he edged out his compatriot Norbelis Bárzaga by four tenths of a point margin to take the silver medal in the free pistol, accumulating a score of 639.3. Despite losing to gold to U.S. shooter Daryl Szarenski, who achieved the slot earlier from the 2002 World Championships, Borrero grabbed one of the available Olympic slots to compete for the Cuban team.

At the 2004 Summer Olympics in Athens, Borrero scored 535 points to nearly escape from the end of the field for a fortieth-place finish in the free pistol prelims, failing to advance further into the final.
