= Shooting at the 2011 Pan American Games =

- Venues: Pan American Shooting Polygon; Jalisco Hunting Club
- Dates: October 15–23
- Competitors: 248 from 26 nations

Shooting competitions at the 2011 Pan American Games in Guadalajara were held from October 15 to October 23 at the Pan American Shooting Polygon (rifle and pistol events) and Jalisco Hunting Club (shotgun events). Shooting is one of the many sports offering Olympic qualification.

== Medal summary ==
=== Medal table ===
* Host nation (Mexico)

Rank	Nation	Gold	Silver	Bronze	Total
1	United States	10	4	4	18
2	Guatemala	2	0	0	2
3	Cuba	1	4	1	6
4	Canada	1	1	0	2
5	Brazil	1	0	5	6
6	Venezuela	0	1	2	3
7	Argentina	0	1	1	2
7	Chile	0	1	1	2
9	Colombia	0	1	0	1
9	Puerto Rico	0	1	0	1
9	Trinidad and Tobago	0	1	0	1
12	Mexico*	0	0	1	1
Totals (12 entries)		15	15	15	45

=== Men's events ===
Event	Gold	Silver	Bronze
10 metre air pistol	Daryl Szarenski; United States	Roger Daniel; Trinidad and Tobago	Júlio Almeida; Brazil
10 metre air rifle	Matthew Rawlings; United States	Jonathan Hall; United States	Gonzalo Moncada; Chile
25 metre rapid fire pistol	Emil Milev; United States	Juan Perez; Cuba	Franco Di Mauro; Venezuela
50 metre pistol	Sergio Sanchez; Guatemala	Daryl Szarenski; United States	Júlio Almeida; Brazil
50 metre rifle prone	Michael McPhail; United States	Alex Suligoy; Argentina	Jason Parker; United States
50 metre rifle three positions	Jason Parker; United States	Matthew Wallace; United States	Bruno Heck; Brazil
Trap	Jean Pierre Brol; Guatemala	Danilo Caro; Colombia	Roberto Schmits; Brazil
Double trap	Walton Eller; United States	José Torres; Puerto Rico	Luiz Da Graca; Brazil
Skeet	Vincent Hancock; United States	Guillermo Torres; Cuba	Juan Rodriguez; Cuba

=== Women's events ===
Event	Gold	Silver	Bronze
10 metre air pistol	Dorothy Ludwig; Canada	Maribel Pineda; Venezuela	Sandra Uptagrafft; United States
10 metre air rifle	Emily Caruso; United States	Eglis Yaima Cruz; Cuba	Rosa Del Carmen Peña; Mexico
25 metre pistol	Ana Luiza Mello; Brazil	Sandra Uptagrafft; United States	Maribel Pineda; Venezuela
50 metre rifle three positions	Dianelys Pérez; Cuba	Eglis Yaima Cruz; Cuba	Sarah Beard; United States
Trap	Miranda Wilder; United States	Lindsay Boddez; Canada	Kayla Browning; United States
Skeet	Kimberly Rhode; United States	Francisca Crovetto; Chile	Melisa Gil; Argentina

== Schedule ==
All times are Central Daylight Time (UTC−5).

Day	Date	Start	Finish	Event	Phase
Day 3	Sunday October 16, 2011	9:00	16:00	Men/Women's 10 metre air pistol	Preliminaries/Finals
Day 4	Monday October 17, 2011	9:00	16:00	Men/Women's 10 metre air rifle	Preliminaries/Finals
Day 5	Tuesday October 18, 2011	9:00	13:30	Men's 50 metre pistol/Women's trap	Preliminaries/Finals
Day 6	Wednesday October 19, 2011	9:00	15:00	Men's 50 metre rifle prone/Men's trap	Preliminaries/Finals
Day 6	Wednesday October 19, 2011	9:00	15:00	Women's 25 metre pistol	Preliminaries/Finals
Day 7	Thursday October 20, 2011	9:00	15:00	Men's double trap	Preliminaries/Finals
Day 8	Friday October 21, 2011	9:00	14:00	Men's 50 metre rifle three positions/Women's skeet	Preliminaries/Finals
Day 9	Saturday October 22, 2011	9:00	15:00	Men's 25 metre rapid fire pistol/Men's skeet	Preliminaries/Finals
Day 9	Saturday October 22, 2011	9:00	15:00	Women's 50 metre rifle three positions	Preliminaries/Finals

== Summary ==
The following countries have earned quotas:

Nation	Men									Women						Total	
Nation	FR 3x40	FR 60PR	AR 60	FP	RFP	AP 60	TR 125	DT 150	SK 125	STR 3x20	AR 40	SP	AP 40	TR 75	SK 75	Quotas	Athletes
Argentina	2	2	2	2	1	2	2	0	2	2	2	0	0	0	1	20	18
Barbados	0	0	0	1	0	1	0	0	1	0	0	0	0	0	0	3	2
Bolivia	0	1	1	1	0	1	2	0	0	1	2	0	0	0	0	9	6
Brazil	2	2	2	2	2	2	2	2	2	2	2	2	2	2	0	28	22
Canada	1	2	2	1	1	1	2	2	2	2	2	2	2	2	0	24	18
Cayman Islands	0	0	0	0	0	0	1	0	1	0	0	0	0	0	0	2	2
Chile	2	2	2	1	0	2	2	0	2	2	2	1	1	2	1	22	17
Colombia	0	2	0	1	0	1	1	1	1	0	0	2	2	0	0	11	7
Cuba	2	2	2	2	2	2	0	0	2	2	2	2	2	0	0	22	15
Dominican Republic	1	1	1	2	2	2	2	2	2	1	1	2	2	0	0	21	12
Ecuador	0	0	0	1	0	1	0	0	0	0	1	2	2	0	0	7	4
El Salvador	1	1	1	1	1	1	0	0	0	2	2	1	1	0	0	12	7
Guatemala	2	2	2	1	1	1	2	2	2	2	2	2	2	0	1	24	15
Jamaica	0	0	0	0	0	1	1	0	0	0	0	0	0	0	0	2	2
Mexico	2	2	2	2	0	2	2	1	2	2	2	2	2	2	1	26	20
Netherlands Antilles	0	0	0	0	0	1	1	1	0	0	0	0	0	0	0	3	2
Nicaragua	1	1	1	2	1	2	0	0	0	0	0	0	0	0	0	8	3
Panama	0	0	0	1	2	2	2	0	0	0	0	0	1	0	0	8	4
Paraguay	0	0	0	0	0	2	0	0	0	0	0	0	0	0	0	2	2
Peru	2	2	2	2	1	2	2	2	2	2	2	2	2	0	0	25	17
Puerto Rico	1	1	1	0	0	0	0	2	2	1	2	0	0	1	0	11	8
Trinidad and Tobago	0	0	0	1	0	1	1	0	1	0	0	0	0	0	0	4	2
United States	2	2	2	2	2	2	2	2	2	2	2	2	2	2	1	29	23
Uruguay	0	0	1	0	0	0	0	0	0	0	1	0	0	0	0	2	2
Venezuela	2	2	2	2	2	2	2	2	2	1	2	2	2	0	0	25	16
Virgin Islands	0	1	0	0	0	0	0	0	0	0	0	1	1	0	0	3	2
Total	23	28	26	28	18	34	29	19	28	24	29	25	26	11	5	353	248
