= Hattie Johnson =

American sport shooter

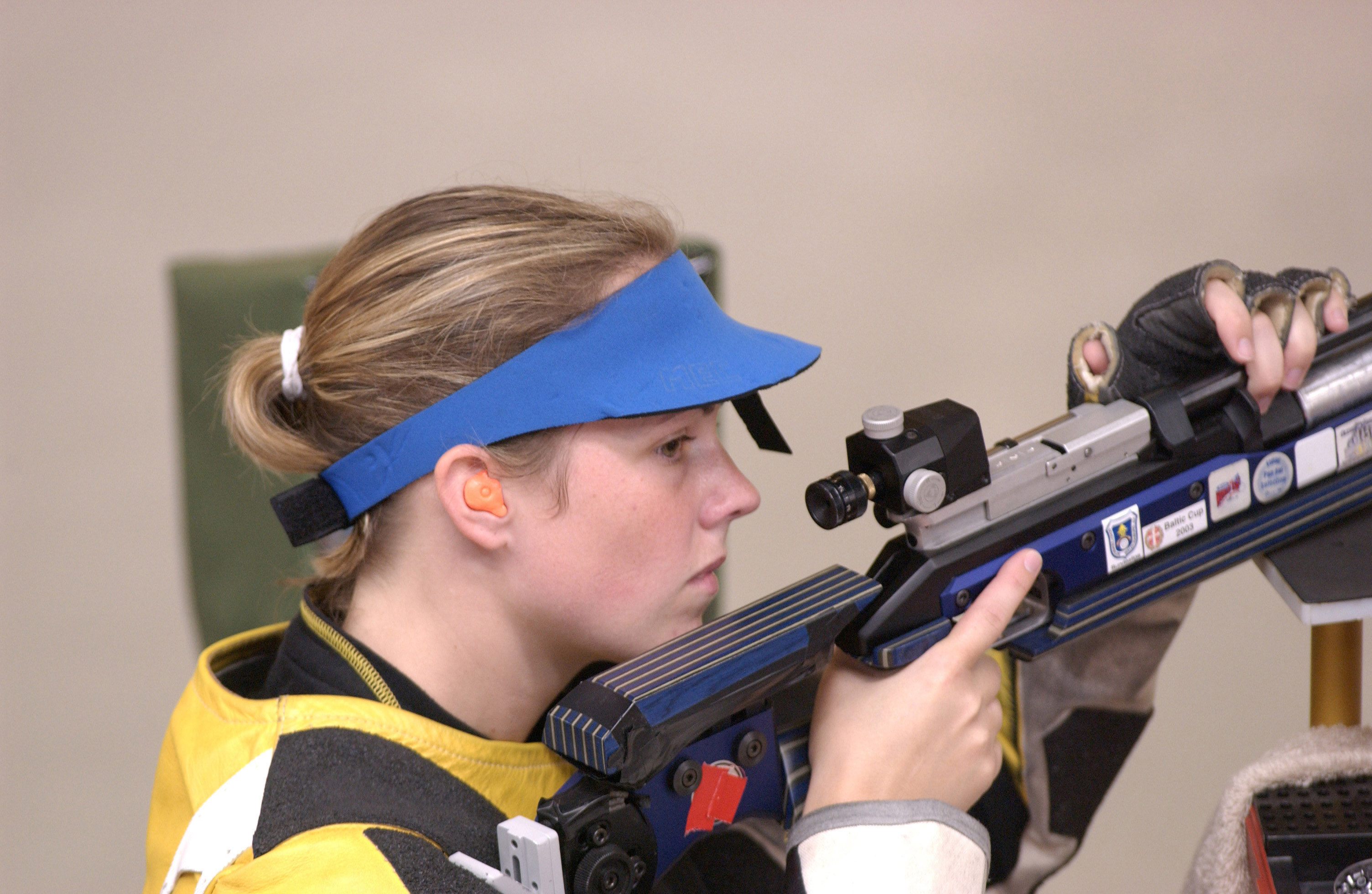
- Johnson in 2004

Personal information
- Full name: Hattie Jean Ponti-Johnson
- Nationality: American
- Born: September 18, 1981 (age 44) Emmett, Idaho

Sport
- Country: United States
- Sport: Sport shooting
Medal record
Women's shooting
Representing the United States
Pan American Games
| Bronze medal – third place | 2003 Santo Domingo | 50 m Rifle 3 Positions |
- Updated on 13 August 2012

Hattie Johnson (née Ponti; born September 18, 1981) is a former Olympic athlete. The Athol, Idaho, resident competed in the Women's 10-metre Air Rifle at the 2004 Summer Olympics in Athens, Greece, finishing in 14th place. At the 2003 Pan American Games, she won a bronze medal in the Women's 50-meter Rifle 3 Positions Event.

At the 2004 Summer Olympics, Johnson competed while a member of the United States Army. She was then a medical Spc., assigned to the Marksmanship Unit at Fort Benning, Georgia.
