= Alexis Martínez (sport shooter) =

Mexican rifle shooter

Personal information
- Full name: Alexis Gabriela Martínez Macías
- Born: 19 May 1991 (age 35) Salamanca, Guanajuato, Mexico
- Height: 161 cm (5 ft 3 in)

Sport
- Sport: Shooting sports
Medal record
Representing Mexico
Central American and Caribbean Games
Gold medal – first place	2010 Mayaguez	50m rifle 3 positions
Gold medal – first place	2014 Veracruz	10m air rifle team
Gold medal – first place	2014 Veracruz	50m rifle 3 positions team
Gold medal – first place	2014 Veracruz	50m rifle team
Silver medal – second place	2006 Cartagena	10m air rifle team
Silver medal – second place	2010 Mayaguez	10m air rifle
Bronze medal – third place	2010 Mayaguez	50m rifle team
Bronze medal – third place	2014 Veracruz	50m air rifle team

Alexis Gabriela Martínez Macías (Note: In this Spanish name, the first or paternal surname is Martínez and the second or maternal family name is Macías.) (born 19 May 1991) is a Mexican rifle shooter. She competed in the 50 m rifle 3 positions event at the 2012 Summer Olympics, where she placed 39th.
