= Janine Bowman =

American sport shooter (born 1973)

Personal information
- Nationality: American
- Born: March 15, 1973 (age 53) Woonsocket, Rhode Island

Sport
- Sport: Shooting

Janine Bowman (born March 15, 1973, in Woonsocket, Rhode Island) is an American sport shooter. She placed 24th in the women's 25 metre pistol event at the 2000 Summer Olympics.
