= Emerson Duarte =

Brazilian sports shooter (born 1971)

Personal information
- Born: 18 October 1971 (age 54) São Paulo, Brazil

Sport
- Sport: Sports shooting
Medal record
Representing Brazil
Pan American Games
Silver medal – second place	2015 Toronto	25m rapid fire pistol

Emerson Duarte (born 18 October 1971) is a Brazilian sports shooter. He competed in the men's 25 metre rapid fire pistol event at the 2016 Summer Olympics.
