= Jorge Orozco =

Mexican sport shooter

Personal information
- Born: 9 April 2000 (age 25) Guadalajara, Jalisco, Mexico

Sport
- Sport: Shooting

Jorge Martin Orozco Dias (born 9 April 2000) is a Mexican sport shooter. He represented Mexico at the 2020 Summer Olympics in Tokyo.
