= Janice Teixeira =

Brazilian sports shooter

- Teixeira in 2003

Personal information
- Born: 20 May 1962 (age 64)

Sport
- Sport: Sports shooting

Janice Teixeira (born 20 May 1962) is a Brazilian former sports shooter. She competed in the women's trap event at the 2016 Summer Olympics. She suffered a stroke while working as commentator at the 2008 Summer Olympics.
