= Laina Pérez =

Cuban sport shooter (born 1988)

Personal information
- Born: 27 October 1988 (age 37) Matanzas, Cuba
- Height: 171 cm (5 ft 7 in)

Sport
- Country: Cuba
- Sport: Shooting
Medal record
Women's shooting
Representing Cuba
Pan American Games
Gold medal – first place	2019 Lima	10 m air pistol
Gold medal – first place	2019 Lima	Mixed 10 m air pistol
Central American and Caribbean Games
Gold medal – first place	2018 Barranquilla	Team 25 m pistol
Gold medal – first place	2023 San Salvador	25 m pistol
Gold medal – first place	2018 Barranquilla	Mixed 10 m air pistol
Silver medal – second place	2018 Barranquilla	25 m pistol
Silver medal – second place	2018 Barranquilla	Team 10 m air pistol
Silver medal – second place	2023 San Salvador	Team 25 m pistol
Bronze medal – third place	2023 San Salvador	10 m air pistol

Laina Pérez (born 27 October 1988) is a Cuban sport shooter. She won the gold medal in the women's 10 metres air pistol event at the 2019 Pan American Games held in Lima, Peru. She also won the gold medal in the mixed 10 metres air pistol event together with Jorge Grau.

At the 2018 Shooting Championships of the Americas held in Guadalajara, Mexico, she won the silver medal in the women's 25 metres pistol event.

She competed at the 2020 Summer Olympics held in Tokyo, Japan. She also represented Cuba at the 2024 Summer Olympics held in Paris, France.
