= Juan Schaeffer =

Guatemalan sport shooter

Personal information
- Full name: Juan Ramon Schaeffer
- Nationality: Guatemalan
- Born: 13 October 1982 (age 43)
- Height: 173 cm (5 ft 8 in)

Sport
- Country: Guatemala
- Sport: Shooting
- Event: Skeet
Medal record
Men's shooting
Representing Guatemala
Pan American Games
Silver medal – second place	2019 Lima	Skeet

Juan Ramon Schaeffer (born 13 October 1982) is a Guatemalan sport shooter. In 2019, he won the silver medal in the men's skeet event at the 2019 Pan American Games held in Lima, Peru.

In 2015, he competed in the men's skeet event at the 2015 Pan American Games without winning a medal. He did not advance to the semi-final and he was eliminated in the qualification round.

He represented Guatemala at the 2020 Summer Olympics in Tokyo, Japan. He competed in the men's skeet event.
