= Danilo Caro =

Colombian trap shooter (born 1965)

Personal information
- Full name: Danilo Caro Guarnieri
- Born: 6 September 1965 (age 60) Bogotá, Colombia
- Height: 1.72 m (5 ft 7 1/2 in)
- Weight: 75 kg (165 lb)

Sport
- Country: Colombia
- Sport: Shooting
Medal record
Representing Colombia
Men's shooting
Event	1st	2nd	3rd
Pan American Games	1	1	3
CAC Games	0	6	5
South American Games	3	0	1
Bolivarian Games	2	3	4
Total	6	10	13
Pan American Games
Gold medal – first place	1999 Winnipeg	Trap
Silver medal – second place	2011 Guadalajara	Trap
Bronze medal – third place	1995 Mar del Plata	Trap team
Bronze medal – third place	2003 Santo Domingo	Trap
Bronze medal – third place	2015 Toronto	Trap
Central American and Caribbean Games
Silver medal – second place	1993 Ponce	Trap team
Silver medal – second place	1993 Ponce	Double trap team
Silver medal – second place	1998 Maracaibo	Trap
Silver medal – second place	1998 Maracaibo	Trap team
Silver medal – second place	2018 Barranquilla	Trap team
Silver medal – second place	2018 Barranquilla	Double trap team
Bronze medal – third place	2006 Cartagena	Trap team
Bronze medal – third place	2010 Mayagüez	Trap team
Bronze medal – third place	2014 Veracruz	Trap
Bronze medal – third place	2014 Veracruz	Trap team
Bronze medal – third place	2018 Barranquilla	Double trap
South American Games
Gold medal – first place	2010 Medellín	Trap team
Gold medal – first place	2014 Santiago	Trap
Gold medal – first place	2018 Cochabamba	Trap
Bronze medal – third place	2018 Cochabamba	Mixed trap
Bolivarian Games
Gold medal – first place	2009 Sucre	Trap
Gold medal – first place	2017 Santa Marta	Trap team
Silver medal – second place	2005 Armenia-Pereira	Trap team
Silver medal – second place	2009 Sucre	Trap team
Silver medal – second place	2009 Sucre	Double trap team
Bronze medal – third place	2005 Armenia-Pereira	Trap
Bronze medal – third place	2013 Trujillo	Trap
Bronze medal – third place	2013 Trujillo	Double trap team
Bronze medal – third place	2017 Santa Marta	Trap

Danilo Caro Guarnieri (born 6 September 1965 in Bogotá) is a Colombian trap shooter. He competed in the trap event at the 2012 Summer Olympics and placed 29th in the qualification round. He won gold in the Pan-American Games in 1999, bronze in 2003, and silver in 2011, where he received the quota for the London 2012 Olympic Games.

== Olympic results ==
Event	1996	2000	2004	2008	2012	2016
Trap	31st 118	7th 115	33rd 108	—	29th 115	27th 110
Double trap	—	23rd 120	—	—	—	—
