= Patricia Rivas =

Salvadoran sport shooter (born 1980)

Personal information
- Full name: Patricia Yanira Rivas Miranda
- Nationality: El Salvador
- Born: 15 February 1980 (age 46) San Salvador, El Salvador
- Height: 1.52 m (5 ft 0 in)
- Weight: 48 kg (106 lb)

Sport
- Sport: Shooting
- Event(s): 10 m air rifle (AR40); 50 m rifle prone (STR60PR); 50 m rifle 3 positions (STR3X20)
- Coached by: Reynaido Flores

Patricia Yanira Rivas Miranda (born February 15, 1980, in San Salvador) is a Salvadoran sport shooter. She won a bronze medal in the small-bore rifle prone at the 2001 American Continental Championships in Fort Benning, Georgia, United States, and was selected to compete for El Salvador in air rifle shooting at the 2004 Summer Olympics. Rivas trains for the national shooting team under longtime coach Reynaido Flores.

Rivas qualified as a lone shooter for the Salvadoran squad in the women's 10 m air rifle at the 2004 Summer Olympics in Athens, having registered a minimum qualifying standard of 380 from her outside-final finish at the Pan American Games in Santo Domingo, Dominican Republic a year earlier. Rivas put up a more spectacular aim to set her career best of 393 points in the qualifying round after nailing a perfect 100 on the third 10-shot series, but her score was sufficient to land her in a two-way draw with India's Anjali Bhagwat for twentieth position.
