= José Luis Sánchez (sport shooter) =

Mexican sport shooter

Personal information
- Full name: José Luis Sánchez Castillo
- Nationality: Mexico
- Born: 28 May 1987 (age 39) Monterrey, Nuevo León, Mexico
- Height: 1.68 m (5 ft 6 in)
- Weight: 60 kg (132 lb)

Sport
- Sport: Shooting
- Event: 10 m air rifle (AR60)
- Club: Rifle y Cana
- Coached by: Wang Yuan
Medal record
Men's shooting
Representing Mexico
Pan American Games
Bronze medal – third place	2019 Lima	50 m rifle 3 positions

José Luis Sánchez Castillo (Note: In this Spanish name, the first or paternal surname is Sánchez and the second or maternal family name is Castillo.) (born 28 May 1987) is a Mexican sport shooter. Sanchez represented Mexico at the 2008 Summer Olympics in Beijing, where he competed in the men's 10 m air rifle, along with his teammate Roberto José Elias. He finished only in twenty-fourth place by one point behind U.S. shooter Jason Parker from the final attempt, for a total score of 591 targets.
