= Frank Thompson (sport shooter) =

American sport shooter

Personal information
- Born: 11 March 1988 (age 37); Alliance, Nebraska, United States

Sport
- Sport: Sport shooting

Frank Thompson (born March 11, 1988) is an American sport shooter. Thompson became a member of the National Development Team in 2006. At the 2012 Summer Olympics he competed in the Men's skeet, finishing in 8th place. He finished in 21st at the 2016 Olympics.
