= Fernando Borello =

Argentine sports shooter

Personal information
- Born: 12 February 1980 (age 46) Santa Fe, Argentina

Sport
- Sport: Sports shooting
Medal record
Representing Argentina
Pan American Games
Silver medal – second place	2015 Toronto	Trap

Fernando Borello (born 12 February 1980) is an Argentine sports shooter. He competed in the men's trap event at the 2016 Summer Olympics.
