= Javier Rodríguez (sport shooter) =

Mexican sport shooter

Personal information
- Full name: Javier Rodríguez Segovia
- Born: 22 December 1964 (age 61) Saltillo, Mexico
- Height: 175 cm (5 ft 9 in)

Sport
- Sport: Shooting sports
Medal record
Representing Mexico
Central American and Caribbean Games
Gold medal – first place	2010 Mayaguez	Skeet team
Silver medal – second place	2014 Veracruz	Skeet team

Javier Rodríguez Segovia (Note: In this Spanish name, the first or paternal surname is Rodríguez and the second or maternal family name is Segovia.) (born 22 December 1964 in Saltillo, Coahuila) is a Mexican sport shooter. At the 2012 Summer Olympics he competed in the Men's skeet, finishing in 24th place.

His daughter, Gabriela Rodriguez, is also a sports shooter.
