= Eglis Yaima Cruz =

Cuban sport shooter (born 1980)

Personal information
- Born: 12 April 1980 (age 46) Sancti Spíritus, Cuba

Sport
- Sport: Sport shooting
Medal record
Women's shooting
Representing Cuba
Olympic Games
Bronze medal – third place	2008 Beijing	50 m rifle 3 positions
Pan American Games
Gold medal – first place	2003 Santo Domingo	50 m rifle 3 positions
Gold medal – first place	2003 Santo Domingo	10 m air rifle
Gold medal – first place	2007 Rio de Janeiro	10 m air rifle
Gold medal – first place	2015 Toronto	50 m rifle 3 positions
Silver medal – second place	2007 Rio de Janeiro	50 m rifle 3 positions
Silver medal – second place	2011 Guadalajara	10 m air rifle
Silver medal – second place	2011 Guadalajara	50 m rifle 3 positions
Silver medal – second place	2019 Lima	50 m rifle 3 positions
Bronze medal – third place	2015 Toronto	10 m air rifle

Eglis Yaima de la Cruz (born 12 April 1980) is a Cuban sports shooter. She won the bronze medal at the 2008 Summer Olympics, the first and, as of 2020, only female medalist for her country in the sport. She has competed at five editions of the Olympics, from Athens 2004 to Tokyo 2020.

At the Pan American Games, she has won nine medals through five editions, four of them gold.
