= Sergio Piñero =

Spanish sports shooter

Personal information
- Born: 28 November 1974 (age 51) Las Palmas, Spain

Sport
- Sport: Shooting sports
Medal record
Representing Dominican Republic
Pan American Games
Silver medal – second place	2015 Toronto	Double trap
Central American and Caribbean Games
Gold medal – first place	2010 Mayaguez	Trap
Gold medal – first place	2010 Mayaguez	Trap team
Gold medal – first place	2010 Mayaguez	Double trap team
Gold medal – first place	2014 Veracruz	Trap team
Bronze medal – third place	2010 Mayaguez	Double trap
Bronze medal – third place	2014 Veracruz	Double trap team
Bronze medal – third place	2018 Barranquilla	trap team
Representing Spain
Mediterranean Games
Bronze medal – third place	1997 Bari	Double trap

Sergio Piñero (born 28 November 1974, in Spain) is a trap shooter who competes for the Dominican Republic. He competed in the trap event at the 2012 Summer Olympics and placed 20th in the qualification round.
