= Lucas Rafael Bennazar Ortiz =

Puerto Rican sport shooter

Personal information
- Nationality: Puerto Rico
- Born: 7 February 1969 (age 57) Guaynabo, Puerto Rico
- Height: 1.83 m (6 ft 0 in)
- Weight: 86 kg (190 lb)

Sport
- Sport: Shooting
- Event(s): Trap, double trap
Medal record
Representing Puerto Rico
Pan American Games
Bronze medal – third place	2003 Santo Domingo	Double trap
Bronze medal – third place	2007 Rio de Janeiro	Double trap
Central American and Caribbean Games
Gold medal – first place	2002 San Salvador	Double trap
Gold medal – first place	2002 San Salvador	Double trap team
Gold medal – first place	2010 Mayaguez	Double trap
Silver medal – second place	2002 San Salvador	Trap team
Silver medal – second place	2006 Cartagena	Double trap team
Silver medal – second place	2010 Mayaguez	Double trap team
Silver medal – second place	2014 Veracruz	Double trap team
Bronze medal – third place	2014 Veracruz	Double trap

Lucas Rafael Bennazar Ortiz (born February 7, 1969) is a Puerto Rican sport shooter. At age thirty-five, Bennazar made his official debut for the 2004 Summer Olympics in Athens, where he competed in two shotgun events. He placed twenty-seventh in the men's trap, with a score of 112 points, tying his position with France's Yves Tronc and Italy's Marco Venturini. Few days later, he competed for his second event, the double trap, where he was able to fire 3 sets of 50 shots, for an overall total score of 122 points, finishing only in twenty-third place.

At the 2008 Summer Olympics in Beijing, Bennazar competed for the second time in the men's double trap, an event which was later dominated by U.S. shooter Walton Eller. In the qualifying rounds, Bennazar fired a total of 123 shots in three different sets, finishing only in seventeenth place.
