= Jorge Atalah =

Chilean sport shooter (born 1968)

Personal information
- Full name: Jorge Nicolás Atalah Moya
- Nationality: Chile
- Born: 22 October 1968 (age 57) Viña del Mar, Chile
- Height: 1.75 m (5 ft 9 in)
- Weight: 88 kg (194 lb)

Sport
- Sport: Shooting
- Event: Skeet
- Coached by: Angel Marentis
Medal record
Men's shooting
Representing Chile
South American Games
Silver medal – second place	2022 Asunción	Skeet

Jorge Nicolás Atalah Moya (born October 22, 1968) is a Chilean sport shooter. He won a silver medal in men's skeet shooting at the 2004 ISSF World Cup in Americana, São Paulo, Brazil, with a total score of 147 points. Atalah is also the son of Nicolas Atalah, who competed in the same event at the 1968 Summer Olympics in Mexico City, Mexico.

Atalah made his official debut for the 2004 Summer Olympics in Athens, where he placed thirty-first in men's skeet shooting, with a total score of 117 points, tying his position with Barbados' Michael Maskell, Germany's Axel Wegner, and Great Britain's Richard Brickell.

At the 2008 Summer Olympics in Beijing, Atalah competed for the second time, as a 39-year-old, in men's skeet shooting. He finished only in twenty-eighth place by one point ahead of Lebanon's Ziad Richa from the final attempt, for a total score of 111 targets.
