= Sergio Sánchez (sport shooter) =

Guatemalan modern pentathlete

Personal information
- Born: August 22, 1970 (age 55)
- Height: 1.7 m (5 ft 7 in)
- Weight: 68 kg (150 lb)

Sport
- Country: Guatemala
- Sport: Shooting
- Event(s): 50m Pistol, 10m Pistol
- Coached by: Juan Carlos Mendez Garay
Medal record
Men's Shooting
Representing Guatemala
Pan American Games
| Gold medal – first place | 2011 Guadalajara | 50m Pistol |
Central American and Caribbean Games
| Gold medal – first place | 2010 Mayagüez | 25m Rapid Fire Pistol |
| Silver medal – second place | 1993 Ponce | 50m Pistol Team |
| Silver medal – second place | 1998 Maracaibo | 10m Air Pistol Team |
| Silver medal – second place | 2002 San Salvador | 10m Air Pistol Team |
| Bronze medal – third place | 1993 Ponce | 25m Rapid Fire Pistol Team |
| Bronze medal – third place | 2002 San Salvador | 25m Rapid Fire Pistol Team |
| Bronze medal – third place | 2010 Mayagüez | 25m Standard Pistol |
- Updated on 22 July 2012

Sergio Sánchez (born 22 August 1970) is a Guatemalan sports shooter. He competed at the 1996 Summer Olympics in 50 meter free pistol where he finished at eighth place. He won gold in the 50 meter pistol at the 2011 Pan American Games. He competed for Guatemala at the 2012 Summer Olympics. He also competed in the modern pentathlon at the 1992 Summer Olympics.
