= Roger Daniel =

Trinidad and Tobago sport shooter

Personal information
- Nationality: Trinidad and Tobago
- Born: 22 February 1970 (age 56) Port of Spain, Trinidad and Tobago
- Height: 196 cm (6 ft 5 in)
- Weight: 106 kg (234 lb)

Sport
- Sport: Shooting
Medal record
Men's Shooting
Representing Trinidad and Tobago
Central American and Caribbean Games
Gold medal – first place	2002 San Salvador	50m Pistol
Gold medal – first place	2010 Mayagüez	25m Standard Pistol
Silver medal – second place	2006 Cartagena	25m Standard Pistol
Bronze medal – third place	2006 Cartagena	10m Air Pistol
Bronze medal – third place	2010 Mayagüez	50m Pistol
Commonwealth Games
Silver medal – second place	2010 Delhi	25m Standard Pistol
Silver medal – second place	2010 Delhi	50m Pistol Pairs
Bronze medal – third place	2006 Melbourne	50m Pistol
Pan American Games
Silver medal – second place	2011 Guadalajara	10m Air Pistol
- Updated on 16 September 2012

Roger Peter Daniel (born 22 February 1970 in Port of Spain) is a Trinidad and Tobago sport shooter who competes in the men's 10 metre air pistol and men's 50 metre pistol. At the 2012 Summer Olympics, he finished 36th in the qualifying round of the 10 metre air pistol competition, failing to make the cut for the final. He came 35th in the 50 metre pistol event.
