= Alexander Molerio =

Cuban sports shooter (born 1991)

Personal information
- Born: 19 September 1991 (age 34)

Sport
- Sport: Sports shooting

Alexander Molerio (born 19 September 1991) is a Cuban sports shooter. He competed in the men's 10 metre air rifle event at the 2016 Summer Olympics.
