= Servando Puldón =

Cuban sports shooter (born 1961)

Personal information
- Born: 21 September 1961 (age 64) Havana, Cuba

Sport
- Sport: Sports shooting
Medal record
Representing Cuba
Pan American Games
Gold medal – first place	1995 Mar del Plata	Skeet
Gold medal – first place	1995 Mar del Plata	Skeet team
Silver medal – second place	1987 Indianapolis	Skeet team
Silver medal – second place	1991 Havana	Skeet team

Servando Puldón Reyes (born 21 September 1961) is a Cuban sports shooter. He competed at the 1992 Summer Olympics and the 1996 Summer Olympics.
