= Jean Pierre Brol =

Guatemalan sport-shooter

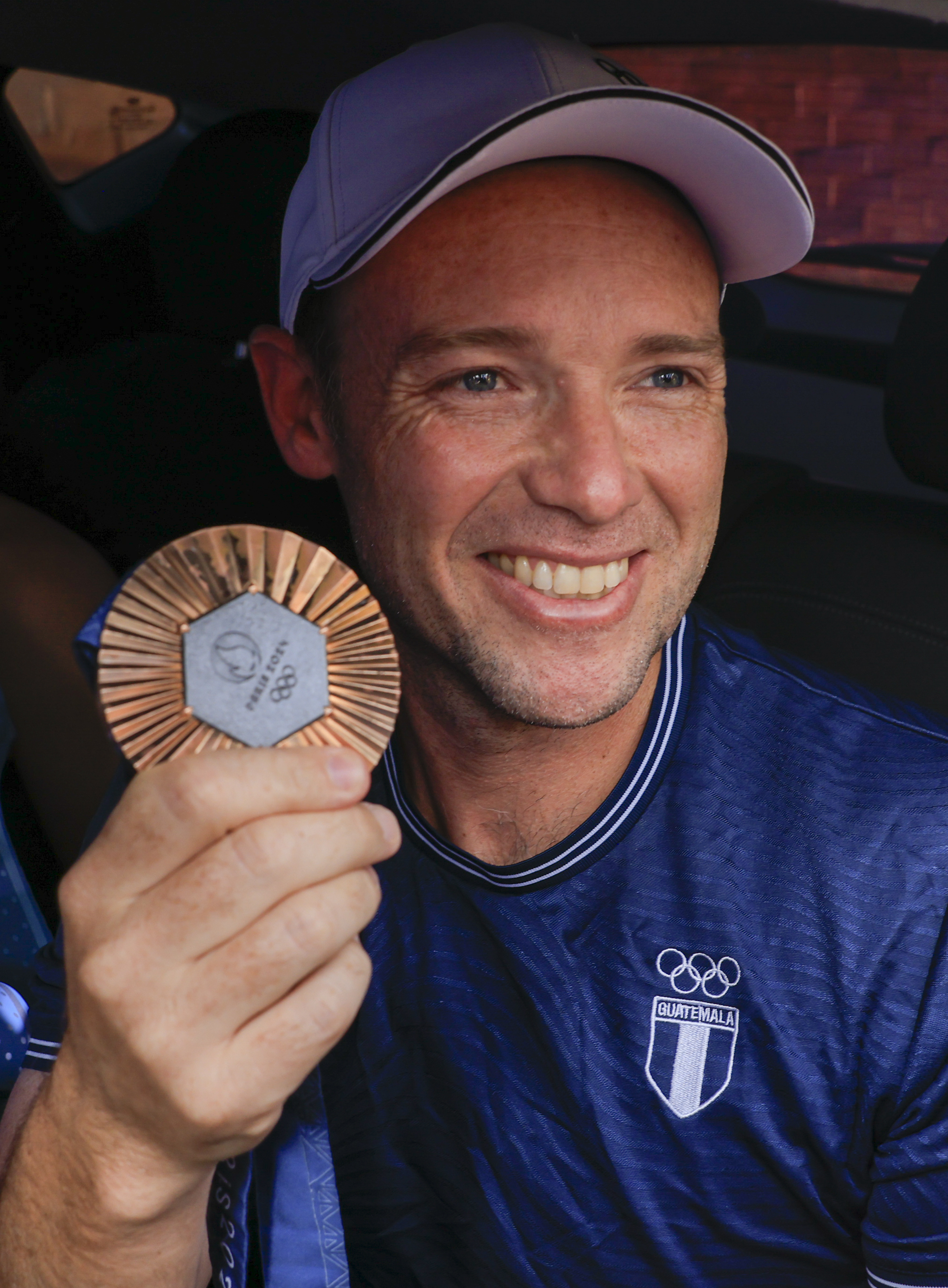
- Brol at the 2024 Summer Olympics

Personal information
- Born: December 18, 1982 (age 43) Guatemala City, Guatemala
- Occupation: Agricultural engineer
- Height: 1.79 m (5 ft 10 in)
- Weight: 91 kg (201 lb)

Sport
- Country: Guatemala
- Sport: Shooting
- Event: Trap
- Coached by: Pedro Martin Fariza
Medal record
Men's shooting
Representing Guatemala
Olympic Games
Bronze medal – third place	2024 Paris	Trap
Pan American Games
Gold medal – first place	2011 Guadalajara	Trap
Central American and Caribbean Games
Gold medal – first place	2002 San Salvador	Trap Team
Gold medal – first place	2006 Cartagena	Trap Team
Silver medal – second place	2002 San Salvador	Trap
Silver medal – second place	2010 Mayagüez	Trap
Silver medal – second place	2010 Mayagüez	Trap Team
Bronze medal – third place	2006 Cartagena	Trap
Representing Independent Athletes Team
Pan American Games
Gold medal – first place	2023 Santiago	Trap
Representing Centro Caribe Sports
Central American and Caribbean Games
Gold medal – first place	2023 San Salvador	Trap Team
- Updated on 30 July 2024

Jean Pierre Brol (born December 18, 1982) is a Guatemalan sport-shooter. He won gold for shooting at the 2011 Pan American Games in Men's trap and competed in the 2012 Summer Olympics, in the men's trap event. He finished in 28th place.

He won the bronze medal in Paris 2024 in the Men's Trap event, which represented Guatemala's second medal in its Olympic history.
