= Jorge Álvarez (sport shooter) =

Cuban sports shooter (born 1989)

Personal information
- Born: 3 August 1989 (age 36) Havana, Cuba

Sport
- Sport: Sports shooting
Medal record
Representing Cuba
Pan American Games
Gold medal – first place	2019 Lima	25m rapid fire pistol

Jorge Álvarez Llanes (born 3 August 1989) is a Cuban sports shooter. He competed in the men's 25 metre rapid fire pistol event at the 2020 Summer Olympics.
