= Dianelys Pérez =

Cuban sports shooter (born 1988)

Personal information
- Born: 28 June 1988 (age 38) Matanzas, Cuba

Sport
- Sport: Sports shooting
Medal record
Representing Cuba
Pan American Games
Gold medal – first place	2011 Guadalajara	50 m rifle three positions

Dianelys Pérez (born 28 June 1988) is a Cuban sports shooter. She competed in the Women's 10 metre air rifle and the women's 50 metre three positions events at the 2012 Summer Olympics. At the 2016 Olympics, she again competed in both events.
