= Felipe Beuvrín =

Venezuelan sports shooter (born 1978)

Personal information
- Nationality: Venezuelan
- Born: 14 June 1978 (age 47)

Sport
- Sport: Shooting
- Event(s): 50 metre pistol, 10 metre air pistol

Felipe Beuvrín (born June 14, 1978 in Mérida) is a Venezuelan sport shooter. He competed at the 2000 Summer Olympics, tying for 30th place in the men's 10 metre air pistol and tying for 34th place in the men's 50 metre pistol. Beuvrín started competing in 1991.
