= Juan Miguel Rodríguez =

Cuban sport shooter (born 1967)

Personal information
- Born: 26 May 1967 (age 59) Havana, Cuba

Sport
- Sport: Sport shooting
Medal record
Representing Cuba
Men's shooting
Olympic Games
Bronze medal – third place	2004 Athens	Skeet
Pan American Games
Gold medal – first place	1999 Winnipeg	Skeet
Bronze medal – third place	2015 Toronto	Skeet

Juan Miguel Rodriguez (born May 26, 1967) is a Cuban sport shooter and Olympic medallist, born in Havana. He received a bronze medal in skeet shooting at the 2004 Summer Olympics in Athens.

Olympic results
Event	1996	2000	2004	2016
Skeet	8th 121	39th 116	(bronze) Bronze; 122+25	26th 116
