= Julio Dujarric =

Dominican sport shooter

Personal information
- Full name: Julio Elizardo Dujarric Lembcke
- Nationality: Dominican Republic
- Born: 28 December 1977 (age 48)
- Height: 1.73 m (5 ft 8 in)
- Weight: 79 kg (174 lb)

Sport
- Sport: Shooting
- Event: Skeet
- Club: Panamerican Center
- Coached by: Gissi Simone

Julio Elizardo Dujarric Lembcke (born December 28, 1977) is a Dominican sport shooter. Dujarric made his official debut for the 2004 Summer Olympics in Athens, where he placed twenty-first in men's skeet, with a score of 119 points, tying his position with seven other shooters including former Olympic champion Ennio Falco of Italy, and five-time Olympian Guillermo Alfredo Torres of Cuba.

At the 2008 Summer Olympics in Beijing, Dujarric competed for his second time in men's skeet shooting, where he placed thirty-first in the two-day qualifying rounds, with a total score of 110 points.

Additionally, Dujarric has participated in 7 World Championships. In 2001, he placed 76th with a score of 110. A year later, in 2002, he placed 78th with a score of 112. Then, in 2005, he placed 19th with a score of 118. In 2010, he got 103rd place with a score of 111 points. A year later, in 2011, he placed 41st with a total score of 121. In 2014, he placed 47th with 117 points. Lastly, in 2019, he placed 55th with a score of 117.

Dujarric has also participated in over 29 World Cups, 5 Continental American Championships, and 5 Pan American Games.
