= Guillermo Alfredo Torres =

Cuban sport shooter (born 1959)

Personal information
- Born: 10 February 1959 (age 67) San Antonio de los Baños, Cuba

Sport
- Sport: Sport shooting
Medal record
Representing Cuba
Pan American Games
Gold medal – first place	1995 Mar del Plata	Skeet team
Silver medal – second place	1983 Caracas	Skeet team
Silver medal – second place	1987 Indianapolis	Skeet team
Silver medal – second place	2003 Santo Domingo	Skeet
Silver medal – second place	2011 Guadalajara	Skeet
Bronze medal – third place	1979 San Juan	Skeet team

Guillermo Alfredo Torres (born February 10, 1959) is a Cuban sport shooter. He competed in skeet shooting events at the Summer Olympics in 1980, 1992, 1996, 2000, 2004, and 2012.

== Olympic results ==
Event	1980	1992	1996	2000	2004	2012
Skeet (mixed)	6th	T-11th	Not held			
Skeet (men)	Not held		T-20th	T-43rd	T-21st	30th
