= Jorge Grau (sport shooter) =

Cuban sports shooter (born 1987)

Personal information
- Born: 15 February 1987 (age 39) Guantánamo, Cuba

Sport
- Sport: Sports shooting
Medal record
Men's shooting
Representing Cuba
Pan American Games
Gold medal – first place	2019 Lima	10 m air pistol
Gold medal – first place	2019 Lima	Mixed 10 m air pistol

Jorge Grau Potrille (born 15 February 1987) is a Cuban sports shooter. He competed in the men's 10 metre air pistol event at the 2016 Summer Olympics. He competed at the 2020 Summer Olympics.
