= Leuris Pupo =

Cuban sport shooter (born 1977)

Personal information
- Full name: Leuris Pupo Requejo
- Nationality: Cuba
- Born: April 9, 1977 (age 49) Holguín, Cuba

Sport
- Sport: Shooting
Medal record
Summer Olympics
Gold medal – first place	2012 London	25 m rapid fire pistol
Silver medal – second place	2020 Tokyo	25 m rapid fire pistol
Pan American Games
Silver medal – second place	2019 Lima	25 m rapid fire pistol
Gold medal – first place	2023 Santiago	25 m rapid fire pistol

Leuris Pupo Requejo (born 9 April 1977) is a Cuban shooter who has represented his nation at seven Summer Olympic Games.

Pupo's first Olympic appearance came at the 2000 Summer Olympics held in Sydney, Australia where he finished tied for ninth place in the men's 25 metre rapid fire pistol. He competed in the same event at the 2004 Summer Olympics in Athens, Greece, finishing tied for seventh place, and again at the 2008 Summer Olympics in Beijing, China where he again finished seventh.

At the 2012 Summer Olympics in London, United Kingdom, Pupo won the gold medal in the men's 25 metre rapid fire pistol.

He won the silver medal in the men's 25 metre rapid fire pistol event at the 2020 Summer Olympics.
