= 2018 Shooting Championships of the Americas =

The 2018 Shooting Championships of the Americas took place in Guadalajara, Mexico from November 3 to November 10, 2018.

== Men's events ==
| Event | Gold | | Silver | | Bronze | |
|---|---|---|---|---|---|---|
Pistol
| 10m Air Pistol | James Hall; United States | 240.8 AmR | José Pablo Castillo; Guatemala | 236.6 | Philipe Severo; Brazil | 215.9 |
| 10m Air Pistol Team | United States; Nickolaus Mowrer; James Hall; Jack Hobson Leverett III | 1717 | Peru; Kevin Altamirano; Jose Manrrique Ullilen; Marko Carrillo | 1699 | Brazil; Júlio Almeida; Philipe Severo; Felipe Wu | 1697 |
| 25m Rapid Fire Pistol | Leuris Pupo; Cuba | 30 | Emerson Duarte; Brazil | 28 | Keith Sanderson; United States | 23 |
| 25m Rapid Fire Pistol Team | United States; Keith Sanderson; Jack Hobson Leverett III; Alexander Chichkov | 1704 | Brazil; Emerson Duarte; Vladimir Silveira; José Carlos Batista | 1685 | Bolivia; Diego Cossio; Rudolf Knijnenburg; Victor Garcia | 1639 |
| 25m Standard Pistol | Júlio Almeida; Brazil | 572 | José Carlos Batista; Brazil | 567 | Emerson Duarte; Brazil | 558 |
| 25m Standard Pistol Team | Brazil; Júlio Almeida; José Carlos Batista; Emerson Duarte | 1697 | Puerto Rico; Luis Lopez; Giovanni González; Javier Medina | 1639 | Barbados; Justin Ricardo Best; Bernard Chase; Ronald Sargeant | 1507 |
| 50m Pistol | David Perez Arredondo; Mexico | 548 | Felipe Wu; Brazil | 547 | Júlio ALmeida; Brazil | 542 |
| 50m Pistol Team | Brazil; Júlio Almeida; Felipe Wu; Vladimir Silveira | 1621 | Puerto Rico; Luis Lopez; Giovanni González; Ferdinand Rodriguez | 1489 | Barbados; Albert Eversley; Bernard Chase; Ronald Sargeant | 956 |
Rifle
| 10m Air Rifle | Dempster Christenson; United States | 248.5 AmR | Lucas Kozeniesky; United States | 246.7 | Alexis Eberhardt; Argentina | 224.8 |
| 10m Air Rifle Team | United States; Dempster Christenson; Bryant Wallizer; Lucas Kozeniesky | 1868.8 | Mexico; Luis Emiliano Blanco; Luis Emilio Morales; Edson Ismael Ramirez | 1854.4 | Argentina; Alexis Eberhardt; Marcelo Gutierrez; Facundo Firmapaz | 1847.7 |
| 50m 3 Positions Rifle | George Norton; United States | 450.8 | Patrick Sunderman; United States | 442.5 | Juan Diego Angeloni; Argentina | 430.8 |
| 50m 3 Positions Rifle Team | United States; Lucas Kozeniesky; George Norton; Patrick Sunderman | 3470 | Argentina; Alexis Eberhardt; Juan Diego Angeloni; Alejandro Pasero | 3462 | Mexico; José Luis Sánchez; Luis Emilio Morales; Alfonso Manrique | 3458 |
| 50m Prone Rifle | Leonardo Moreira; Brazil | 624.3 | Cassio Rippel; Brazil | 620.0 | Lucas Kozeniesky; United States | 618.9 |
| 50m Prone Rifle Team | United States; Lucas Kozeniesky; George Norton; Dempster Christenson | 1848.6 | Canada; Grzegorz Sych; Wynn Payne; Michal Dugovic | 1838.9 | Costa Rica; Edgardo Sepulveda; Andrey Calvo; Roberto Chamberlain | 1805.5 |
Shotgun
| Trap | Alessandro de Souza Ferreira; Peru | 45 AmR | Jorge Martin Orozco; Mexico | 43 AmRJ | Walton Eller; United States | 33 |
| Trap Team | Peru; Alessandro de Souza Ferreira; Francisco Boza; Asier Cilloniz | 357 | United States; Walton Eller; Grayson Davey; Casey Wallace | 357 | Canada; Drew Shaw; David Mosscrop; Curtis Wennberg | 350 |
| Skeet | Frank Thompson; United States | 59 EAmR | Federico Gil; Argentina | 57 | Jorge Atalah; Chile | 47 |
| Skeet Team | United States; Frank Thompson; Phillip Russell Jungman; Dustan Taylor | 363 AmR | Chile; Jorge Atalah; Hector Flores; Matías Martínez | 357 | Mexico; Luis Raul Gallardo; Javier Rodríguez; Carlos Segovia | 350 |

== Women's events ==
| Event | Gold | | Silver | | Bronze | |
|---|---|---|---|---|---|---|
Pistol
| 10m Air Pistol | Lynda Kiejko; Canada | 235.2 | Alexis Lagan; United States | 234.2 | Diana Durango; Ecuador | 213.1 |
| 10m Air Pistol Team | United States; Sandra Uptagrafft; Alexis Lagan; Sarah Eungee Choe | 1696 | Mexico; Alejandra Zavala; Mariana Nava; Karen Quezada | 1690 | Guatemala; Kimberly Liñares; Delmi Cruz; Lucia Menendez | 1668 |
| 25m Pistol | Alexis Lagan; United States | 29 AmR | Laina Pérez; Cuba | 27 | Sandra Uptagrafft; United States | 23 |
| 25m Pistol Team | United States; Sandra Uptagrafft; Alexis Lagan; Katelyn Morgan Abeln | 1714 | Mexico; Alejandra Zavala; Mariana Nava; Karen Quezada | 1692 | Guatemala; Kimberly Liñares; Delmi Cruz; Lucia Menendez | 1682 |
Rifle
| 10m Air Rifle | Minden Miles; United States | 248.4 AmR | Alison Marie Weisz; United States | 247.9 | Fernanda Russo; Argentina | 226.2 |
| 10m Air Rifle Team | United States; Alison Marie Weisz; Sarah Beard; Minden Miles | 1876.5 AmR | Argentina; Fernanda Russo; Alliana Volkart; Salma Loana Antorena | 1861.1 | Mexico; Gabriela Martinez; Michel Quezada; Carla Carrera | 1859.1 |
| 50m 3 Positions Rifle | Sarah Beard; United States | 450.8 | Dianelys Pérez; Cuba | 445.7 | Yarimar Mercado; Puerto Rico | 432.6 |
| 50m 3 Positions Rifle Team | United States; Sarah Beard; Mackensie Rae Martin; Rachel Garner | 3502 AmR | Guatemala; Tatiana Liñares; Polymaria Velasquez; Jazmine Matta | 3427 | Mexico; Sofia Hernandez; Nancy Leal; Erendira Barba | 3418 |
| 50m Prone Rifle | Sarah Beard; United States | 617.7 | Polymaria Velasquez; Guatemala | 616.1 | Hannah Black; United States | 612.8 |
| 50m Prone Rifle Team | United States; Sarah Beard; Mackensie Rae Martin; Hannah Black | 1836.5 | Guatemala; Tatiana Liñares; Polymaria Velasquez; Jazmine Matta | 1828.6 | Mexico; Evangelina Jesus; Nancy Leal; Erendira Barba | 1826.0 |
Shotgun
| Trap | Kayle Browning; United States | 45 | Adriana Ruano; Guatemala | 43 | Ashley Carroll; United States | 34 |
| Trap Team | United States; Ashley Carroll; Aeriel Skinner; Kayle Browning | 354 WR | Mexico; Alejandra Ramirez; Cinthya Clemenz; Clarissa Ortiz | 324 | Guatemala; Ana Soto; Adriana Ruano; Stefanie Goetzke | 323 |
| Skeet | Amber English; United States | 55 | Kimberly Rhode; United States | 52 | Francisca Crovetto; Chile | 43 |

== Mixed events ==
| Event | Gold | | Silver | | Bronze | |
|---|---|---|---|---|---|---|
| Pistol | United States 1 Alexis Lagan; Nickolaus Mowrer | 481.1 AmR | United States 2 Sandra Uptagrafft; James Hall | 479.6 | Ecuador; Andrea Perez; Yautung Cueva | 411.1 |
| Rifle | United States 2 Minden Miles; Dempster Christenson | 496,7 AmR | Argentina; Salma Antorena; Alexis Eberhardt | 494.9 | United States 1 Sarah Beard; Lucas Kozeniesky | 429.4 |
| Trap | United States 2 Ashley Carroll; Grayson Davey | 46 AmR | Mexico 1 Alejandra Ramirez; Jorge Martin Orozco | 42 | Guatemala 2 Adriana Ruano; Jean Pierre Brol | 33 |

== Medal table ==
| Rank | Nation | Gold | Silver | Bronze | Total |
|---|---|---|---|---|---|
| 1 | United States (USA) | 25 | 7 | 7 | 39 |
| 2 | Brazil (BRA) | 4 | 5 | 4 | 13 |
| 3 | Peru (PER) | 2 | 1 | 0 | 3 |
| 4 | Mexico (MEX) | 1 | 6 | 5 | 12 |
| 5 | Cuba (CUB) | 1 | 2 | 0 | 3 |
| 6 | Canada (CAN) | 1 | 1 | 1 | 3 |
| 7 | Guatemala (GUA) | 0 | 5 | 4 | 9 |
| 8 | Argentina (ARG) | 0 | 4 | 4 | 8 |
| 9 | Puerto Rico (PUR) | 0 | 2 | 1 | 3 |
| 10 | Chile (CHI) | 0 | 1 | 2 | 3 |
| 11 | Barbados (BAR) | 0 | 0 | 2 | 2 |
| 11 | Ecuador (ECU) | 0 | 0 | 2 | 2 |
| 13 | Bolivia (BOL) | 0 | 0 | 1 | 1 |
| 13 | Costa Rica (CRC) | 0 | 0 | 1 | 1 |
| Totals (14 entries) | | 34 | 34 | 34 | 102 |
