= Shooting at the 2026 South American Games =

Shooting competitions at the 2026 South American Games

- Venue: Invencible Centro Internacional de Tiro Deportivo
- Dates: September 15–20
- Competitors: 159 from 12 nations

Shooting competitions at the 2026 South American Games in Rosario, Santa Fe, and Rafaela, Argentina, were held between September 15 and 20 at Invencible Centro Internacional de Tiro Deportivo, in Recreo, Santa Fe.

A total of 15 events were contested (six men's, six women's and three mixed). The games will give qualifying quotas for the individual events from the 2027 Pan American Games shooting competitions.

== Medal summary ==
=== Medal table ===
* Host nation (Argentina)

Rank	Nation	Gold	Silver	Bronze	Total
1	Peru	7	3	5	15
2	Argentina*	5	2	3	10
3	Brazil	1	5	5	11
4	Ecuador	1	2	0	3
5	Uruguay	1	0	0	1
6	Chile	0	2	1	3
7	Venezuela	0	1	1	2
Totals (7 entries)		15	15	15	45

=== Medalists ===
==== Men ====
Event	Gold	Silver	Bronze
10 metre air pistol	Marko Carrillo; Peru	Yautung Cueva; Ecuador	Felipe Wu; Brazil
25 metre rapid fire pistol	Kevin Altamirano; Peru	Douglas Gómez; Venezuela	Felipe Wu; Brazil
10 metre air rifle	Marcelo Gutiérrez; Argentina	Daniel Vidal; Chile	Alexis Eberhardt; Argentina
50 metre rifle three positions	Alexis Eberhardt; Argentina	Marcelo Zoccali; Argentina	Julio Iemma; Venezuela
Trap	Alessandro de Souza; Peru	Asier Cilloniz; Peru	Joaquín Cisneros; Argentina
Skeet	Nicolás Pacheco; Peru	Federico Gil; Argentina	Héctor Flores; Chile

==== Women ====
Event	Gold	Silver	Bronze
10 metre air pistol	Julieta Mautone; Uruguay	Annia Becerra; Peru	Deysi Jilapa; Peru
25 metre pistol	Andrea Pérez; Ecuador	Diana Durango; Ecuador	Marina Mendonça; Brazil
10 metre air rifle	Fernanda Russo; Argentina	Geovana Meyer; Brazil	Sara Vizcarra; Peru
50 metre rifle three positions	Alexia Arenas; Peru	Geovana Meyer; Brazil	Amelia Fournel; Argentina
Trap	Almudena Boza; Peru	Georgia Furquim; Brazil	Camilla Cosmoski; Brazil
Skeet	Mara Kucharski; Argentina	Francisca Crovetto; Chile	Daniella Borda; Peru

==== Mixed team ====
Event	Gold	Silver	Bronze
10 metre air pistol	Annia Becerra; Marko Carrillo; Peru	Tatiana Diniz; Felipe Wu; Brazil	Deysi Jilapa; Jose Ullilén; Peru
10 metre air rifle	Fernanda Russo; Marcelo Gutierrez; Argentina	Geovana Meyer; Eduardo Sampaio; Brazil	Alexia Arenas; Diego Morin; Peru
Trap	Leonardo Lustoza; Camilla Cosmoski; Brazil	Alessandro de Souza; Almudena Boza; Peru	Jaison Santin; Georgia Furquim; Brazil

== Participation ==
Twelve nations participated in the shooting events of the 2026 South American Games.

- Argentina (25)
- Bolivia (6)
- Brazil (24)
- Chile (23)
- Colombia (11)
- Curaçao (7)
- Ecuador (8)
- Panama (1)
- Paraguay (3)
- Peru (27)
- Uruguay (8)
- Venezuela (16)

== Results ==
=== Men's 10 metre air pistol ===
Rank	Athlete	Qualification						Total	Final									Total
Rank	Athlete	1	2	3	4	5	6	Total	1	2	3	4	5	6	7	8	9	Total
1st place, gold medalist(s)	(Peru) Marko Carrillo	94	96	95	95	98	94	572-19x Q	50.5	47.2	20.7	20.7	18.3	19.8	20.4	20.7	19.4	237.7
2nd place, silver medalist(s)	(Ecuador) Yautung Cueva	94	97	96	92	97	95	571-9x Q	48.0	50.6	19.9	19.6	20.7	18.4	21.1	18.4	19.5	236.2
3rd place, bronze medalist(s)	(Brazil) Felipe Wu	96	98	96	95	91	98	574-12x Q	49.7	47.8	19.5	18.3 20.1	20.7	20.3	18.6		215.0	
4	(Brazil) Caio Almeida	97	95	97	96	98	95	578-20x Q	48.7	48.5	18.7	19.7	19.4	19.3	20.4			194.7
5	(Bolivia) Rudolf Knijnenburg	93	97	91	97	96	90	564-17x Q	49.7	48.9	19.2	17.7	18.5	18.4				172.4
6	(Colombia) Alex Peralta	96	95	97	96	91	95	570-13x Q	48.1	47.5	20.0	19.3	17.5					152.4
7	(Argentina) Germán Zaupa	90	91	98	94	96	98	567-11x Q	48.0	45.9	18.9	18.4						131.2
8	(Colombia) Sebastián Sánchez	95	95	95	94	96	91	566-14x Q	46.1	46.5	19.5							112.1
9	(Peru) José Ullilen	96	94	94	94	93	93	564-16x	Did not advance									
10	(Venezuela) Diego Oduber	93	94	93	96	95	93	564-14x	Did not advance									
11	(Ecuador) Fernando Pozo	93	94	93	97	93	93	563-13x	Did not advance									
12	(Argentina) Germán Koukas	94	93	90	94	92	98	561-12x	Did not advance									
13	(Chile) Diego Parra	91	97	97	93	94	89	561-10x	Did not advance									
14	(Uruguay) Nicolás Paolino	96	91	93	88	96	94	558-12x	Did not advance									
15	(Venezuela) Douglas Gómez	92	94	93	95	92	91	557-10x	Did not advance									
16	(Chile) Dennis Kennedy	90	96	93	93	94	90	556-14x	Did not advance									
17	(Curaçao) Philip Elhage	94	91	97	93	89	89	553-11x	Did not advance									
	(Curaçao) Sedney Martis							DNS	Did not advance									

=== Men's 25 metre rapid fire pistol ===
Rank	Athlete	Precision			Rapid			Total	Final								Total
Rank	Athlete	1	2	3	1	2	3	Total	1	2	3	4	5	6	7	8	Total
1st place, gold medalist(s)	(Peru) Kevin Altamirano	96	99	91	100	98	96	294 Q	1	5	3	3	3	2	5	3	25
2nd place, silver medalist(s)	(Venezuela) Douglas Gómez	98	96	90	98	93	95	285 Q	3	3	3	2	5	2	3	3	24
3rd place, bronze medalist(s)	(Brazil) Felipe Wu	98	94	89	98	94	91	284 Q	3	2	2	2	4	3	2		18
4	(Venezuela) Diego Oduber	96	93	82	96	98	90	282 Q	1	3	3	4	1				12
5	(Colombia) Alex Peralta	94	92	91	94	93	92	283 Q	2	4	2	2					10
6	(Peru) Marko Carrillo	96	93	93	96	99	96	292 Q	4	2	1						7
7	(Chile) Dennis Kennedy	93	92	81	93	84	85	263 Q	1	1	2						4

=== Men's 10 metre air rifle ===
Rank	Athlete	Qualification						Total	Final									Total
Rank	Athlete	1	2	3	4	5	6	Total	1	2	3	4	5	6	7	8	9	Total
1st place, gold medalist(s)	(Argentina) Marcelo Gutiérrez	103.5	207.5	313.5	419.0	524.2	629.0	629.0 Q	51.5	51.1	20.9	21.0	21.0	20.4	20.4	20.7	20.4	247.4
2nd place, silver medalist(s)	(Chile) Daniel Vidal	103.7	104.0	106.0	105.5	105.2	104.8	621.8 Q	51.6	52.1	21.1	20.9	20.1	20.5	19.7	20.9	20.1	247.0
3rd place, bronze medalist(s)	(Argentina) Alexis Eberhardt	102.7	103.5	103.6	103.8	105.1	104.6	623.3 Q	51.3	51.4	20.0	20.9	20.1	20.2	20.5	21.0		225.4
4	(Peru) Favio Salas	103.7	105.0	101.2	103.9	104.1	102.4	620.3 Q	52.2	50.2	20.2	21.2	20.6	20.4	19.5			204.2
5	(Brazil) Eduardo Sampaio	105.4	102.8	102.2	102.1	104.3	102.5	619.3 Q	50.5	51.3	20.3	19.9	20.8	20.5				183.3
6	(Venezuela) Julio Iemma	101.4	101.6	105.2	103.5	103.2	103.7	618.6 Q	50.3	50.7	20.2	20.3	20.0					161.5
7	(Peru) Diego Morín	101.1	101.1	102.5	104.1	103.8	104.4	617.0 Q	50.2	49.8	20.3	21.1						114.4
8	(Venezuela) Aníbal Pérez	101.9	101.1	103.4	104.1	102.6	103.8	616.9 Q	48.4	49.9	20.4							118.7
9	(Chile) Cristóbal Robles	100.0	102.0	103.5	104.7	102.8	102.0	615.0	Did not advance									
10	(Uruguay) Jonathan Ayala	100.6	103.9	101.8	102.5	101.1	102.2	612.1	Did not advance									
11	(Uruguay) Rudi Lausarot	99.7	101.5	102.6	102.6	103.1	100.6	610.1	Did not advance									
12	(Brazil) Cassio Rippel	101.0	101.1	103.1	101.8	101.3	101.7	610.0	Did not advance									
	(Colombia) Iván López							DNS	Did not advance									

=== Men's 50 metre rifle three positions ===
Rank	Athlete	Qualification			Total	Final								Total
Rank	Athlete	Kneeling	Prone	Standing	Total	1	2	3	4	5	6	7	8	Total
1st place, gold medalist(s)	(Argentina) Alexis Eberhardt	195	198	196	589 Q	100.0	103.7	98.0	9.1	10.5	10.2	10.0	9.4	350.9
2nd place, silver medalist(s)	(Argentina) Marcelo Zoccali	197	198	189	584 Q	100.9	101.1	98.0	10.1	9.4	10.3	10.0	9.6	349.4
3rd place, bronze medalist(s)	(Venezuela) Julio Iemma	191	197	186	574 Q	99.7	100.7	95.8	9.9	10.6	9.1	9.8		335.6
4	(Peru) Daniel Vizcarra	193	193	188	574 Q	101.7	102.2	96.0	8.5	7.5	9.5			325.4
5	(Chile) Cristóbal Robles	198	194	183	575 Q	99.4	97.9	97.9	9.8	8.6				313.6
6	(Chile) Daniel Vidal	194	197	184	575 Q	95.5	98.3	99.9	9.9					303.6
7	(Brazil) Eduardo Sampaio	188	199	188	575 Q	100.1	101.7	90.9						292.7
8	(Peru) Diego Morín	187	195	193	575 Q	90.7	101.1	97.9						289.7
9	(Brazil) Cassio Rippel	189	200	184	573	Did not advance								
10	(Venezuela) Aníbal Pérez	186	190	185	561	Did not advance								
	(Colombia) Iván López				DNS	Did not advance								

=== Men's trap ===
Rank	Athlete	Day 1			Day 2		Total	Final						Total
Rank	Athlete	1	2	3	1	2	Total	1	2	3	4	5	6	Total
1st place, gold medalist(s)	(Peru) Alessandro de Souza	24	25	23	23	24	119 Q	5	3	5	4	4	4	25
2nd place, silver medalist(s)	(Peru) Asier Cilloniz	22	23	21	23	21	110 Q	3	3	5	5	4	3	23
3rd place, bronze medalist(s)	(Argentina) Joaquín Cisneros	23	24	24	23	23	117 Q	3	4	3	4	5		19
4	(Venezuela) Mario Soares	20	20	20	21	22	103 Q	4	3	4	3			14
5	(Venezuela) Leonel Martínez	17	22	23	22	22	106 Q	3	4	3				10
6	(Brazil) Jaison Santin	21	22	22	20	24	109 Q	2	4	3				9
7	(Argentina) Federico Martín	24	23	21	22	22	112 Q	2	3					5
8	(Uruguay) Franco González	22	23	23	23	46	114 Q	1	3					4
9	(Brazil) Leonardo Lustoza	17	23	18	21	23	102	Did not advance						
10	(Panama) Eduardo Taylor	19	18	20	20	24	101	Did not advance						
11	(Chile) Cristóbal Valenzuela	18	19	22	20	20	99	Did not advance						
12	(Colombia) Pedro Gutiérrez	22	18	18	23	23	99	Did not advance						
13	(Chile) Claudio Vergara	17	23	17	18	20	95	Did not advance						
14	(Bolivia) César Menacho	18	20	17	17	19	91	Did not advance						
15	(Bolivia) Henry Áviles	17	16	21	18	18	90	Did not advance						
16	(Paraguay) Paulo Reichardt	15	17	19	15	19	85	Did not advance						

=== Men's skeet ===
Rank	Athlete	Day 1			Day 2		Total	Final									Total
Rank	Athlete	1	2	3	1	2	Total	1	2	3	4	5	6	7	8	9	Total
1st place, gold medalist(s)	(Peru) Nicolás Pacheco	24	23	23	24	25	119 Q	4	4	4	3	3	4	4	4	4	34
2nd place, silver medalist(s)	(Argentina) Federico Gil	20	24	24	24	23	115 Q	3	3	4	3	4	4	4	4	3	32
3rd place, bronze medalist(s)	(Chile) Héctor Flores	24	23	25	24	23	119 Q	4	4	4	4	2	4	3	3		28
4	(Chile) Raimundo Roche	24	22	24	24	23	117 Q	4	2	4	3	3	2	4			22
5	(Argentina) Ariel Romero	23	23	23	25	23	119 Q	0									0
6	(Brazil) Rodrigo Simões	24	24	21	22	23	114 Q	0									0
7	(Peru) Nicolás Giha	19	23	21	21	21	105 Q	0									0

=== Women's 10 metre air pistol ===
Rank	Athlete	Qualification						Total	Final									Total
Rank	Athlete	1	2	3	4	5	6	Total	1	2	3	4	5	6	7	8	9	Total
1st place, gold medalist(s)	(Uruguay) Julieta Mautone	95	94	97	96	98	95	575 Q	50.8	99.1	119.9	139.8	160.0	179.4	200.0	220.7	239.9	239.9
2nd place, silver medalist(s)	(Peru) Annia Becerra	92	95	95	94	97	97	570 Q	48.5	97.4	116.0	136.2	156.5	176.6	196.9	217.1	236.3	236.3
3rd place, bronze medalist(s)	(Peru) Deysi Jilapa	95	94	94	93	92	94	562 Q	46.7	95.9	114.7	135.1	156.2	175.6	196.1	215.1		215.1
4	(Ecuador) Andrea Pérez	93	91	96	97	92	98	567 Q	51.7	101.5	119.6	137.9	156.6	175.6	194.2			194.2
5	(Colombia) Juana Rueda	93	96	94	96	92	93	564 Q	50.0	99.3	118.5	137.0	157.0	175.0				175.0
6	(Argentina) Josefina Mella	95	96	93	97	96	96	573 Q	46.8	94.2	112.5	133.2						133.2
7	(Ecuador) Diana Durango	92	92	89	95	94	99	561 Q	46.8	94.2	112.5	133.2						133.2
8	(Venezuela) Camila Marrufo	93	92	94	95	94	92	560 Q	48.3	93.6	112.1							112.1
9	(Argentina) Victoria Luna	92	91	93	94	94	93	557	Did not advance									
10	(Brazil) Marina Mendonça	91	93	94	89	93	95	555	Did not advance									
11	(Venezuela) Verónica Lozada	92	94	90	93	95	90	554	Did not advance									
12	(Brazil) Tatiana Diniz	93	79	95	94	92	95	548	Did not advance									
13	(Curaçao) Guru Santhiappan	89	93	84	93	95	87	541	Did not advance									
14	(Curaçao) Mikayla Huizer	88	86	90	95	91	87	537	Did not advance									
15	(Paraguay) María Cardozo	89	92	93	86	85	91	536	Did not advance									
16	(Chile) Yasna Valenzuela	87	92	88	88	94	87	536	Did not advance									

=== Women's 25 metre rapid fire pistol ===
Rank	Athlete	Precision			Rapid			Total	Final										Total
Rank	Athlete	1	2	3	1	2	3	Total	1	2	3	4	5	6	7	8	9	10	Total
1st place, gold medalist(s)	(Ecuador) Andrea Pérez	95	99	97	94	98	96	579 Q	2	3	3	2	2	3	1	1	2	3	22
2nd place, silver medalist(s)	(Ecuador) Diana Durango	89	96	92	95	96	93	561 Q	2	2	1	4	3	3	2	1	3		21
3rd place, bronze medalist(s)	(Brazil) Marina Mendonça	97	95	96	95	95	93	571 Q	3	1	3	4	2	2		2			17
4	(Venezuela) Maribel Pineda	92	94	93	99	92	93	563 Q	2	3	1	2	3	2	2	2			17
5	(Brazil) Tatiana Diniz	97	94	91	92	94	92	560 Q	3	1	3	1	2	2					12
6	(Colombia) Juana Rueda	96	93	88	92	91	92	552 Q	1	4	1	2	2						10
7	(Chile) Yasna Valenzuela	87	95	93	93	90	95	553 Q	2	1	1	2							6
8	(Argentina) Laura Ramos	93	95	96	93	92	82	551 Q	1										1
9	(Peru) Claudia Sánchez	93	92	94	89	90	93	551	Did not advance										
10	(Venezuela) Nicole Saavedra	92	88	89	92	96	94	551	Did not advance										
11	(Peru) Liz Carrión	90	90	93	95	93	90	551	Did not advance										
12	(Argentina) Josefina Mella	90	93	95	87	88	87	540	Did not advance										
	(Curaçao) Guru Santhiappan								Did not advance										

=== Women's 10 metre air rifle ===
Rank	Athlete	Qualification						Total	Final									Total
Rank	Athlete	1	2	3	4	5	6	Total	1	2	3	4	5	6	7	8	9	Total
1st place, gold medalist(s)	(Argentina) Fernanda Russo	104.1	105.0	104.9	103.1	104.8	103.8	625.7 Q	51.5	51.9	20.5	21.6	21.1	21.2	20.7	20.4	20.2	249.1
2nd place, silver medalist(s)	(Brazil) Geovanna Meyer	103.6	104.1	103.7	104.1	104.6	104.0	624.1 Q	52.3	51.0	20.3	19.3	20.6	20.9	20.8	20.7	20.8	246.7
3rd place, bronze medalist(s)	(Peru) Sara Vizcarra	101.7	103.0	103.8	104.4	104.1	102.6	619.6 Q	50.9	51.5	20.2	20.3	21.1	20.4	20.9	20.2		225.5
4	(Argentina) Lola Sánchez	102.4	103.9	103.2	103.0	102.8	102.4	617.7 Q	50.5	50.9	20.6	21.2	20.8	19.9	21.3			205.2
5	(Paraguay) Kathia Idoyaga	104.3	101.0	98.4	102.9	100.4	100.9	607.9 Q	51.2	52.1	19.5	19.9	21.0	18.7				182.4
6	(Peru) Alexia Arenas	105.2	103.9	105.4	103.0	104.7	103.1	625.3 Q	51.4	51.4	20.9	19.9	19.8					163.4
7	(Uruguay) Sofía Reyes	101.4	101.9	103.1	102.1	100.1	103.1	611.7 Q	50.2	47.6	19.3	20.4						137.5
8	(Chile) Karina Vera	97.7	100.1	99.6	99.6	97.0	99.6	593.6 Q	47.7	47.6	20.5							115.8
9	(Bolivia) Selenia Ledezma	100.1	96.4	99.2	99.1	99.6	97.6	592.0	Did not advance									
10	(Bolivia) Wendy Palomeque	93.1	92.1	89.5	93.6	96.1	97.7	562.1	Did not advance									
	(Chile) Allison Aguilera	Disqualified																

=== Women's 50 metre rifle three positions ===
Rank	Athlete	Qualification			Total	Final								Total
Rank	Athlete	Kneeling	Prone	Standing	Total	1	2	3	4	5	6	7	8	Total
1st place, gold medalist(s)	(Peru) Alexia Arenas	193	196	194	583 Q	98.1	101.8	98.7	9.3	9.3	10.5	10.3	10.1	348.1
2nd place, silver medalist(s)	(Brazil) Geovana Meyer	197	196	189	582 Q	100.1	98.9	99.0	8.7	9.3	9.7	9.4	10.2	345.3
3rd place, bronze medalist(s)	(Argentina) Amelia Fournel	186	193	181	560 Q	100.4	100.3	92.6	0.2	9.0	10.3	10.5		332.3
4	(Peru) Sara Vizcarra	192	194	190	576 Q	97.4	99.8	96.6	9.3	9.5	7.9			320.5
5	(Chile) Karina Vera	186	197	171	554 Q	96.1	100.4	86.4	7.5	7.6				298.0
6	(Argentina) Salma Antorena	184	190	182	556 Q	92.0	96.1	90.8	9.2					288.1
7	(Chile) Allison Aguilera	184	183	183	550 Q	95.3	96.0	86.1						277.4
8	(Bolivia) Wendy Palomeque	179	188	151	518 Q	93.1	92.8	81.2						267.1

=== Women's trap ===
Rank	Athlete	Day 1			Day 2		Total	Final						Total
Rank	Athlete	1	2	3	1	2	Total	1	2	3	4	5	6	Total
1st place, gold medalist(s)	(Peru) Almudena Boza	16	18	22	20	15	91 Q	4	4	3	3	4	5	23
2nd place, silver medalist(s)	(Brazil) Georgia Furquim	16	18	17	19	16	86 Q	4	5	2	4	4	3	22
3rd place, bronze medalist(s)	(Brazil) Camilla Cosmoski	16	17	13	17	17	80 Q	4	3	3	3	3		16
4	(Colombia) Mariana Morales	19	14	17	17	17	84 Q	4	2	3	2			11
5	(Chile) Pamela Salman	13	19	17	18	18	85 Q	4	1	3				8
	(Argentina) Mara Kucharski	16	18	16	12	16	78 Q	3	2	1				6

=== Women's skeet ===
Rank	Athlete	Day 1			Day 2		Total	Final									Total
Rank	Athlete	1	2	3	1	2	Total	1	2	3	4	5	6	7	8	9	Total
1st place, gold medalist(s)	(Argentina) Mara Kucharski	22	19	19	19	21	98 Q	2	2	3	3	3	3	4	2	4	26
2nd place, silver medalist(s)	(Chile) Francisca Crovetto	25	23	24	24	23	119 Q	2	4	1	4	2	2	3	3	3	24
3rd place, bronze medalist(s)	(Peru) Daniella Borda	21	24	24	22	23	114 Q	4	3	1	3	3	3	2	1		20
4	(Brazil) Georgia Furquim	21	18	21	21	17	100 Q	3	3	2	2	2	3	3			18

=== Mixed 10 metre air pistol ===
Rank	Athlete	Qualification			Total	Final						Total
Rank	Athlete	1	2	3	Total	1	2	3	4	5	6	Total
1st place, gold medalist(s)	(Peru) Marko Carrillo / Annia Becerra	187	194	189	570 Q	97.6	100.4	96.7	59.6	58.4	58.9	471.6
2nd place, silver medalist(s)	(Brazil) Felipe Wu / Tatiana Diniz	184	193	191	568 Q	93.0	97.5	98.2	60.2	58.7	57.3	464.9
3rd place, bronze medalist(s)	(Peru) José Ullilen / Deysi Jilapa	192	191	193	576 Q	100.2	93.6	95.2	58.5	58.3	405.8	
4	(Ecuador) Yautung Cueva / Andrea Pérez	187	191	194	572 Q	92.6	95.8	96.3	58.7			343.5
5	(Brazil) Caio Almeida / Marina Mendonça	189	189	188	566	Did not advance						
6	(Venezuela) Diego Oduber / Verónica Lozada	187	184	191	562	Did not advance						
7	(Uruguay) Nicolás Paolino / Julieta Mautone	191	182	188	561	Did not advance						
8	(Colombia) Alex Peralta / Juana Rueda	187	182	190	559	Did not advance						
9	(Venezuela) Douglas Gómez / Camila Marrufo	191	182	186	559	Did not advance						
10	(Chile) Diego Parra / Yasna Valenzuela	180	189	189	558	Did not advance						
11	(Argentina) Germán Koukas / Victoria Luna	187	184	182	553	Did not advance						
12	(Ecuador) Fernando Pozo / Diana Durango	182	184	185	551	Did not advance						
13	(Argentina) Germán Zaupa / Josefina Mella	186	180	184	550	Did not advance						
14	(Curaçao) Philip Elhage / Mikayla Huizer	183	180	182	545	Did not advance						
	(Curaçao) Guru Santhiappan / Sedney Martis	90	88	92	DNF	Did not advance						

=== Mixed 10 metre air rifle ===
Rank	Athlete	Qualification			Total	Final						Total
Rank	Athlete	1	2	3	Total	1	2	3	4	5	6	Total
1st place, gold medalist(s)	(Argentina) Marcelo Gutiérrez / Fernanda Russo	204.7	207.4	206.6	618.7 Q	103.7	104.2	104.3	61.5	63.2	61.5	498.4
2nd place, silver medalist(s)	(Brazil) Eduardo Sampaio / Geovana Meyer	205.5	208.0	207.7	621.2 Q	103.0	104.0	104.5	62.6	60.2	61.1	495.4
3rd place, bronze medalist(s)	(Peru) Diego Morín / Alexia Arenas	207.4	205.8	207.3	620.5 Q	101.8	104.0	103.	60.9	62.4		432.1
4	(Argentina) Alexis Eberhardt / Lola Sánchez	206.0	207.3	205.0	618.3 Q	100.1	101.0	100.5	62.4			364.0
5	(Chile) Daniel Vidal / Allison Aguilera	203.3	207.7	206.9	617.9	Did not advance						
6	(Peru) Favio Salas / Sara Vizvarra	203.2	209.0	204.8	617.0	Did not advance						
7	(Uruguay) Jonathan Ayala / Sofía Reyes	204.1	204.2	203.4	611.7	Did not advance						
8	(Chile) Cristóbal Robles / Karina Vera	201.3	204.4	203.0	608.7	Did not advance						

=== Mixed trap ===
Rank	Athlete	Qualification			Total	Final				Total
Rank	Athlete	1	2	3	Total	1	2	3	4	Total
1st place, gold medalist(s)	(Brazil) Leonardo Lustoza / Camilla Cosmoski	41	40	37	118 Q	9	9	7	7	32
2nd place, silver medalist(s)	(Peru) Alessandro de Souza / Almudena Boza	40	43	42	125 Q	9	5	8	5	27
3rd place, bronze medalist(s)	(Brazil) Jaison Santin / Georgia Furquim	41	36	43	120 Q	9	9	3		21
4	(Chile) Claudio Vergara / Pamela Salman	31	36	36	103 Q	7	7			14
5	(Argentina) Joaquín Cisneros / Mara Kucharski	35	37	31	103	Did not advance				
6	(Colombia) Pedro Gutiérrez / Mariana Morales	36	29	36	101	Did not advance				
