= Shooting at the 2023 Pan American Games – Mixed pairs skeet =

Mixed pairs skeet at the 2023 Pan American Games
- Venue: Polígono de tiro de Pudahuel
- Dates: October 23
- Competitors: 24 from 10 nations

Medalists
| Gold medal | Vincent Hancock; Dania Vizzi | United States |
| Silver medal | Luis Gallardo; Gabriela Rodríguez | Mexico |
| Bronze medal | Dustan Taylor; Austen Smith | United States |

The mixed pairs skeet competition of the shooting events at the 2023 Pan American Games was held on October 24 at Polígono de tiro de Pudahuel in Santiago, Chile.

== Schedule ==
| Date | Time | Round |
|---|---|---|
| October 23, 2023 | 09:30 | Qualification |
| October 23, 2023 | 13:00 | Final |

== Results ==
=== Qualification round ===
The first and second place advance to the gold medal match, while the third and fourth advance to the bronze medal match.

| Rank | Athlete | Country | 1 | 2 | 3 | Total | Notes |
|---|---|---|---|---|---|---|---|
| 1 | Vincent Hancock; Dania Vizzi | United States | 47; 24; 23 | 48; 25; 23 | 49; 24; 25 | 144; 73; 71 | QG |
| 2 | Luis Gallardo; Gabriela Rodríguez | Mexico | 45; 20; 25 | 49; 24; 25 | 49; 24; 25 | 143; 68; 75 | QG |
| 3 | Dustan Taylor; Austen Smith | United States | 47; 23; 24 | 45; 22; 23 | 50; 25; 25 | 142; 70; 72 | QB |
| 4 | Héctor Flores; Francisca Crovetto | Chile | 48; 25; 23 | 44; 23; 21 | 43; 23; 20 | 135; 72; 64 | |
| 5 | Santiago Romero; Emily Padilla | Independent Athletes Team | 46; 25; 21 | 43; 23; 20 | 44; 23; 21 | 133; 71; 62 | |
| 6 | Trysten Curran-Routledge; Madeleine Boyd | Canada | 45; 23; 22 | 47; 25; 22 | 41; 25; 16 | 133; 73; 60 | |
| 7 | Carlos Segovia; Anabel Molina | Mexico | 44; 23; 21 | 44; 23; 21 | 44; 23; 21 | 132; 69; 63 | |
| 8 | Nicolás Pacheco; Daniella Borda | Peru | 45; 24; 21 | 43; 24; 19 | 44; 23; 21 | 132; 71; 61 | |
| 9 | Jorge Atalah; Josefa Rodríguez | Chile | 42; 23; 19 | 45; 23; 22 | 44; 24; 20 | 131; 70; 61 | |
| 10 | Luis Bermudez III; Paola Bermudez | Puerto Rico | 42; 23; 19 | 43; 19; 24 | 45; 25; 20 | 130; 67; 63 | |
| 11 | Michael Maskell; Michelle Elliot | Barbados | 40; 23; 17 | 43; 23; 20 | 43; 21; 22 | 126; 67; 59 | |
| 12 | Renato Araujo; Georgia Furquim | Brazil | 44; 21; 23 | 39; 19; 20 | 43; 21; 22 | 126; 61; 65 | |

=== Final ===
The results were as follows:

| Rank | Athlete | Country | Total | Notes |
|---|---|---|---|---|
| 1st place, gold medalist(s) | Vincent Hancock; Dania Vizzi | United States | 41 | |
| 2nd place, silver medalist(s) | Luis Gallardo; Gabriela Rodríguez | Mexico | 39 | |
| 3rd place, bronze medalist(s) | Dustan Taylor; Austen Smith | United States | 37 | |
| 4 | Héctor Flores; Francisca Crovetto | Chile | 36 | |
