= Shooting at the 2018 South American Games =

- Venue: Escuela Militar de Sargentos del Ejercito
- Dates: June 2–7
- Competitors: 106 from 13 nations

There were 15 Shooting events at the 2018 South American Games in Cochabamba, Bolivia. Six for men, six for women and three mixed gender events. The events were held between June 2 and 7 at the Escuela Militar de Sargentos del Ejercito. This event was a qualification event for the 2019 Pan American Games in Lima, Peru.

== Medal summary ==
=== Medal table ===
* Host nation (Bolivia)

Rank	Nation	Gold	Silver	Bronze	Total
1	Argentina (ARG)	5	2	1	8
2	Peru (PER)	2	4	2	8
3	Brazil (BRA)	2	2	4	8
4	Colombia (COL)	2	2	3	7
5	Chile (CHI)	2	1	3	6
6	Ecuador (ECU)	1	3	1	5
7	Uruguay (URU)	1	0	0	1
8	Bolivia (BOL)*	0	1	1	2
Totals (8 entries)		**15**	**15**	**15**	**45**

=== Medallists ===
Athletes in bold qualify their nation a quota spot for their respective discipline for the 2019 Pan American Games.

Men

Event	Gold	Silver	Bronze
10 metre air pistol	**Marko Carrillo**; **Peru**	**Yautung Cueva**; **Ecuador**	Júlio Almeida; Brazil
10 metre air rifle	**Alexis Eberhardt**; **Argentina**	**Anyelo Parada**; **Chile**	Daniel Vizcarra; Peru
25 metre rapid fire pistol	**Emerson Duarte**; **Brazil**	Marko Carrillo; Peru	Diego Cossio; Bolivia
50 metre rifle three positions	Alexis Eberhardt; Argentina	**Daniel Vizcarra**; **Peru**	Anyelo Parada; Chile
Trap	**Danilo Caro**; **Colombia**	Alessandro Ferreira; Peru	Roberto Schmits; Brazil
Skeet	**Nicolás Pacheco**; **Peru**	Fernando Gazzotti; Argentina	Ariel Romero; Argentina

Women's events

Event	Gold	Silver	Bronze
10 metre air pistol	**Julieta Mautone**; **Uruguay**	Diana Durango; Ecuador	**Annia Becerra**; **Peru**
10 metre air rifle	**Fernanda Russo**; **Argentina**	**Alliana Volkart**; **Argentina**	Camila Osorio; Colombia
25 metre pistol	**Diana Durango**; **Ecuador**	Andrea Perez; Ecuador	Amanda Mondol; Colombia
50 metre rifle three positions	**Amelia Fournel**; **Argentina**	Angela Barrera; Colombia	Gabriela Lobos; Chile
Trap	**Pamela Salman**; **Chile**	**Medeleine Velasco**; **Bolivia**	Janice Teixeira; Brazil
Skeet	**Georgia Bastos**; **Brazil**	Daniella Olaechea; Peru	Francisca Crovetto; Chile

Mixed pairs events

Event	Gold	Silver	Bronze
10 metre air pistol	Alex Enciso; Juana Rueda; Colombia	Júlio Almeida; Rachel Da Silveira; Brazil	Yautung Cueva; Diana Durango; Ecuador
10 metre air rifle	Alexis Eberhardt; Fernanda Russo; Argentina	Ivan Lopez; Camila Osorio; Colombia	Bruno Heck; Geovana Meyer; Brazil
Trap	Claudio Vergara; Pamela Salman; Chile	Jaison Santin; Janice Teixeira; Brazil	Danilo Caro; Gina Baez; Colombia

== See also ==
- Shooting at the 2019 Pan American Games – Qualification
