= Shooting at the 2022 South American Games =

Shooting competitions at the 2022 South American Games

- Venue: Polígono de Tiro
- Dates: October 9−14
- Nations: 11

Shooting competitions at the 2022 South American Games in Asunción, Paraguay are scheduled to be held between October 9 and 14, 2022 at the Polígono de Tiro.

== Schedule ==
The competition schedule is as follows:

P	Preliminary round	F	Final

Men
Date Event	Sun 9	Mon 10		Tue 11	Wed 12		Thu 13		Fri 14
Men's 10 metre air pistol							P	F	
Men's 25 metre rapid fire pistol				P	P	F			
Men's 10 metre air rifle		P	F						
Men's 50 metre rifle three positions					P	F			
Men's trap	P	P	F						
Men's skeet					P		P	F	

Mixed
Date Event	Sun 9	Mon 10	Tue 11		Wed 12	Thu 13	Fri 14	
Mixed 10 metre air pistol							P	F
Mixed 10 metre air rifle			P	F				
Mixed skeet							F	

Women
Date Event	Sun 9	Mon 10		Tue 11	Wed 12	Thu 13		Fri 14	
Women's 10 metre air pistol						P	F		
Women's 25 metre pistol		P	F						
Women's 10 metre air rifle		P	F						
Women's 50 metre rifle three positions								P	F
Women's trap	P	P	F						
Women's skeet					P	P	F		

== Medal summary ==
=== Medal table ===
* Host nation (Paraguay)

Rank	Nation	Gold	Silver	Bronze	Total
1	Peru (PER)	6	1	2	9
2	Argentina (ARG)	3	2	2	7
3	Brazil (BRA)	2	5	5	12
4	Chile (CHI)	1	4	1	6
5	Venezuela (VEN)	1	2	1	4
6	Ecuador (ECU)	1	1	1	3
7	Colombia (COL)	1	0	2	3
8	Uruguay (URU)	0	0	1	1
Totals (8 entries)		15	15	15	45

=== Medalists ===
==== Men ====
Event	Gold	Silver	Bronze
10 metre air pistol	Juan Sebastián Rivera; Colombia	Felipe Wu; Brazil	Alex Peralta; Colombia
25 metre rapid fire pistol	Emerson Duarte; Brazil	Felipe Wu; Brazil	Alex Peralta; Colombia
10 metre air rifle	Julio Iemma; Venezuela	Alexis Eberhardt; Argentina	Marcelo Gutiérrez; Argentina
50 metre rifle three positions	Alexis Eberhardt; Argentina	Leonardo Vagner; Brazil	Anyelo Parada; Chile
Trap	Asier Cilloniz; Peru	Alessandro de Souza Ferreira; Peru	Franco González; Uruguay
Skeet	Nicolás Pacheco; Peru	Jorge Atalah; Chile	Ariel Romero; Argentina

==== Women ====
Event	Gold	Silver	Bronze
10 metre air pistol	Annia Becerra; Peru	Andrea Pérez Peña; Ecuador	Cibele Breide; Brazil
25 metre pistol	Diana Durango; Ecuador	Cibele Breide; Brazil	Maribel Pineda; Venezuela
10 metre air rifle	Fernanda Russo; Argentina	Salma Loana; Argentina	Geovana Meyer; Brazil
50 metre rifle three positions	Geovana Meyer; Brazil	Diliana Méndez; Venezuela	Lucía Cruz; Peru
Trap	Pamela Salman; Chile	Priscila Campos; Brazil	Valentina Porcella; Peru
Skeet	Daniella Borda; Peru	Francisca Crovetto; Chile	Georgia Bastos; Brazil

==== Mixed team ====
Event	Gold	Silver	Bronze
10 metre air pistol	Annia Becerra; Marko Carrillo; Peru	Maribel Pineda; Douglas Gómez; Venezuela	Marina Pérez; Yautung Cueva; Ecuador
10 metre air rifle	Fernanda Russo; Marcelo Gutiérrez; Argentina	Anyelo Parada; Gladys Aguilera; Chile	Geovana Meyer; Leonardo Vagner; Brazil
Skeet	Daniella Borda; Nicolás Pacheco; Peru	Francisca Crovetto; Héctor Flores; Chile	Georgia Bastos; Roberth Vieira; Brazil

== Participation ==
Eleven nations will participate in shooting of the 2022 South American Games.

- Argentina
- Bolivia
- Brazil
- Chile
- Colombia
- Ecuador
- Panama
- Paraguay
- Peru
- Uruguay
- Venezuela
