= Shooting at the 2023 Pan American Games – Women's skeet =

Women's skeet at the 2023 Pan American Games
- Venue: Polígono de Tiro de Pudahuel
- Dates: 21–22 October
- Competitors: 12 from 9 nations

Medalists
Gold medal	Francisca Crovetto	Chile
Silver medal	Gabriela Rodríguez	Mexico
Bronze medal	Daniella Borda	Peru

The Women's skeet event at the 2023 Pan American Games took place on 21 and 22 October at the Polígono de Tiro de Pudahuel. The home athlete and silver medalist in Lima, Francisca Crovetto, won gold. Gabriela Rodríguez got the silver medal and Daniella Borda the bronze.

== Schedule ==
All times are Chile Standard Time (UTC-3)

Date	Time	Round
October 21–22	9:30	Qualification
October 22	15:00	Final

== Results ==
Rank	Athlete	Country	Day 1	Day 2	Total	Final
1st place, gold medalist(s)	Francisca Crovetto	Chile	72	48	120	50 +4
2nd place, silver medalist(s)	Gabriela Rodríguez	Mexico	71	49	120	50 +3
3rd place, bronze medalist(s)	Daniella Borda	Peru	69	45	114	40
4	Dania Vizzi	United States	70	49	119	29
5	Georgia Furquim	Brazil	70	48	118	21
6	Emilly Padilla	Independent Athletes Team	68	46	114	19
7	MIchelle Eliott	Barbados	62	48	110	DNQ
8	Paola Bermudez	Puerto Rico	63	45	108	DNQ
9	Madeleine Boyd	Canada	65	43	108	DNQ
10	Josefá Rodríguez	Chile	63	42	105	DNQ
11	Anabel Molina García	Mexico	60	43	103	DNQ
12	Austen Smith	United States	DNS	DNS	0	DNQ
