= Shooting at the 2019 Pan American Games – Qualification =

The following is the qualification system and qualified countries for the Shooting at the 2019 Pan American Games competitions.

== Qualification system ==
A total of 256 sport shooters will qualify to compete. Each nation may enter a maximum of 24 athletes (two per each individual event). Therefore, a nation can enter 12 (6 per gender) in each discipline (rifle, pistol and shotgun). There will be three qualification events for shooters to qualify. There will be no quotas awarded for the mixed events, as nations must use already qualified athletes to compete in them. As host nation, Peru will get a quota of six athletes (two per each discipline, and can qualify more) and there will also be two wild cards awarded to nations not qualified.

All quotas will be awarded in sequential order of the event in question and an athlete may only win one quota for a country. A nation may substitute quotas from one event to another as along its within the same discipline (rifle, pistol and shotgun). This means the qualification of quotas will not necessarily reflect the final entry lists.

== Qualification timeline ==
| Event | Date | Venue |
|---|---|---|
| 2018 South American Games | June 2–7, 2018 | (Bolivia) Cochabamba |
| 2018 Central American and Caribbean Games | July 22–31, 2018 | (Colombia) Barranquilla |
| 2018 Shooting Championships of the Americas | November 1–11, 2018 | (Mexico) Guadalajara |

== Quota allocation ==
There will be 78 quotas available in each rifle and pistol along with 92 in shotgun events. Peru's 6 host quota spots will be awarded two per discipline. They are split as follows:

| Event | SA | CAC | PAC | Athletes |
|---|---|---|---|---|
| 10 m air rifle men | 2 | 2 | 17 | 21 |
| 50 m rifle three positions men | 1 | 1 | 16 | 18 |
| 10 m air pistol men | 2 | 2 | 17 | 21 |
| 25 m rapid fire pistol men | 1 | 1 | 16 | 18 |
| Trap men | 1 | 1 | 28 | 30 |
| Skeet men | 1 | 1 | ~~28~~ 25 | 27 |
| 10 m air rifle women | 2 | 2 | 17 | 21 |
| 50 m rifle three positions women | 1 | 1 | ~~16~~ 15 | ~~18~~ 17 |
| 10 m air pistol women | 2 | 2 | 17 | 21 |
| 25 m pistol women | 1 | 1 | ~~16~~ 15 | ~~18~~ 17 |
| Trap women | 2 | 2 | ~~14~~ 10 | 14 |
| Skeet women | 1 | ~~1~~ 0 | ~~13~~ 10 | ~~14~~ 11 |
| Host nation (Peru) | —N/a | | | ~~6~~ 5 |
| Wild card | —N/a | | | ~~2~~ 15 |
| TOTAL | 17 | 16 | 215 | 256 |

- Peru qualified five of six athletes in pistol, meaning one of the host nation spots will be reallocated.

== Qualification summary by event ==
| Nation | Men | | | | | | Women | | | | | | Mixed pairs | | | Total |
| Nation | AP | RFP | AR | R3P | Trap | Skeet | AP | P | AR | R3P | Trap | Skeet | AP | AR | Trap | Athletes |
|---|---|---|---|---|---|---|---|---|---|---|---|---|---|---|---|---|
| Argentina | 2 | | 2 | 2 | 2 | 2 | 1 | | 2 | 1 | | 1 | X | X | | 15 |
| Aruba | | | | | | | | 1 | | | | | | | | 1 |
| Barbados | | | | | 1 | 1 | | | | | | 1 | | | | 3 |
| Bolivia | | 2 | | | 2 | | | | | 1 | 1 | | | | X | 6 |
| Brazil | 2 | 2 | 2 | 1 | 2 | 2 | 2 | 1 | 2 | 2 | 1 | 2 | X | X | X | 21 |
| Canada | 1 | 2 | 1 | 2 | 2 | 2 | 1 | 2 | 1 | 2 | 2 | | X | X | X | 18 |
| Chile | 1 | | 1 | | 2 | 2 | 1 | | 2 | | 1 | 1 | X | X | X | 11 |
| Colombia | | | | 1 | 2 | 2 | | 2 | | | | | | | | 7 |
| Costa Rica | | | 1 | 1 | | | | | | | | | | | | 2 |
| Cuba | 2 | 2 | 2 | 2 | | 2 | 2 | 1 | 2 | 1 | | | X | X | | 16 |
| Dominican Republic | | | | | 1 | 2 | | 1 | | | | | | | | 4 |
| Ecuador | 1 | | | | | 1 | 1 | 1 | | 2 | | | X | | | 6 |
| El Salvador | 1 | | 1 | 1 | | | 1 | 2 | 2 | 1 | | | X | X | | 9 |
| Guatemala | 2 | 2 | 2 | 1 | 2 | 2 | 2 | 1 | 2 | 2 | 2 | 1 | X | X | X | 21 |
| Honduras | | | | | | | 1 | | | | | | | | | 1 |
| Mexico | 2 | 2 | 2 | 2 | 2 | 2 | 2 | 1 | 2 | 2 | 2 | 2 | X | X | X | 23 |
| Panama | | | | | 2 | | | | | | | | | | | 2 |
| Paraguay | | | | | 2 | 1 | | | | | | | | | | 3 |
| Peru | 2 | 1 | 2 | 1 | 2 | 2 | 2 | 2 | 2 | 1 | 1 | 1 | X | X | X | 24 |
| Puerto Rico | | 1 | | 2 | 2 | 2 | 2 | | 2 | | 2 | | X | X | X | 13 |
| Trinidad and Tobago | 1 | | | | | | | 1 | | | | | X | | | 2 |
| United States | 2 | 2 | 2 | 2 | 2 | 2 | 2 | 1 | 2 | 2 | 2 | 2 | X | X | X | 23 |
| Uruguay | | | 2 | | 1 | | 1 | | | | | | | | | 4 |
| Venezuela | 2 | 2 | 1 | | 1 | | | | | | | | | | | 6 |
| Total: 24 NOCs | 21 | 18 | 21 | 18 | 30 | 27 | 21 | 17 | 21 | 17 | 14 | 11 | 13 | 11 | 9 | 256 |

- Countries which have qualified at least one male and female athlete per discipline (pistol, rifle and shotgun) are indicated as qualified in the respective mixed pairs event. This does not necessarily guarantee the country will compete in the event. The total indicated in the bottom per each mixed pairs event is not included as part of athlete total.
- AR = Air rifle, R3P = Rifle three positions, AP = Air pistol, RFP = Rapid fire pistol, P = Pistol

== Qualification summary per discipline ==
| NOC | Pistol | Rifle | Shotgun | Total athletes |
|---|---|---|---|---|
| Argentina | | 4 | | 3 |
| Bolivia | | | 1 | 1 |
| Brazil | 1 | | 1 | 2 |
| Chile | | 1 | 1 | 2 |
| Colombia | | | 1 | 1 |
| Cuba | 3 | 2 | 1 | 6 |
| Ecuador | 2 | | | 2 |
| El Salvador | | 1 | | 1 |
| Guatemala | | 1 | 1 | 2 |
| Mexico | 1 | 4 | 2 | 7 |
| Peru | 4 | 3 | 3 | 10 |
| Uruguay | 1 | | | 1 |
| Total: 12 NOCs | 80 | 80 | 94 | 256 |

== Men ==
=== Pistol events ===
The quota allocation is as follows:

| Event | 10 m air pistol | 25 m rapid pistol |
|---|---|---|
| South American Games | Peru; Ecuador | Brazil |
| Central American and Caribbean Games | Cuba; Cuba | Cuba |
| Pan American Championships | United States; Guatemala; Brazil; Brazil; United States; Mexico; Guatemala; Peru; Trinidad and Tobago; Mexico; Argentina; Venezuela; Argentina; Canada; Venezuela; Chile; El Salvador | Cuba; United States; Venezuela; Brazil; Peru; United States; Canada; Bolivia; Guatemala; Venezuela; Mexico; Bolivia; Canada; Guatemala; Mexico; Puerto Rico |
| Host | | |
| Wild card | | |
| TOTAL | 21 | 18 |

=== Rifle events ===
The quota allocation is as follows:

| Event | 10 m air rifle | 50 m rifle three positions |
|---|---|---|
| South American Games | Argentina; Chile | Peru |
| Central American and Caribbean Games | Mexico; Cuba | Mexico |
| Pan American Championships | United States; United States; Mexico; Brazil; Venezuela; Argentina; Brazil; Guatemala; Cuba; Peru; Canada; Costa Rica; El Salvador; Uruguay; Guatemala; Peru; Uruguay | United States; United States; Argentina; Argentina; Mexico; Canada; Guatemala; Canada; Brazil; Cuba; Puerto Rico; Cuba; Colombia; El Salvador; Puerto Rico; Costa Rica |
| Host | | |
| Wild card | | |
| TOTAL | 21 | 18 |

=== Shotgun events ===
The quota allocation is as follows:

| Event | Trap | Skeet |
|---|---|---|
| South American Games | Colombia | Peru |
| Central American and Caribbean Games | Guatemala | Cuba |
| Pan American Championships | Peru; Mexico; United States; Peru; Chile; Argentina; Canada; United States; Dominican Republic; Canada; Brazil; Brazil; Argentina; Guatemala; Venezuela; Mexico; Colombia; Puerto Rico; Paraguay; Uruguay; Panama; Bolivia; Puerto Rico; Chile; Paraguay; Barbados; Panama; Bolivia | United States; Argentina; Chile; United States; Dominican Republic; Cuba; Chile; Mexico; Canada; Dominican Republic; Mexico; Puerto Rico; Guatemala; Peru; Argentina; Puerto Rico; Ecuador; Guatemala; Colombia; Canada; Brazil; Colombia; Brazil; Barbados; Paraguay |
| Host | | |
| Wild card | | |
| TOTAL | 30 | 27 |

- Three spots in skeet will be reallocated as there was not enough athletes to allocate the full quota of 28 at the Pan American Championships.

== Women ==
=== Pistol events ===
The quota allocation is as follows:

| Event | 10 m air pistol | 25 m pistol |
|---|---|---|
| South American Games | Uruguay; Peru | Ecuador |
| Central American and Caribbean Games | Mexico; Guatemala | Mexico |
| Pan American Championships | Canada; United States; El Salvador; Ecuador; Cuba; United States; Mexico; Puerto Rico; Cuba; Guatemala; Chile; Argentina; Brazil; Brazil; Puerto Rico; Honduras; Peru | Cuba; Brazil; Colombia; United States; Guatemala; Canada; Canada; Peru; El Salvador; Colombia; El Salvador; Dominican Republic; Peru; Trinidad and Tobago; Aruba |
| Host | | |
| Wild card | | |
| TOTAL | 21 | ~~17~~ 18 |

- Only 15 eligible athletes shot in the 25 m pistol event at the Pan American Championships, meaning this spot will be reallocated.

=== Rifle events ===
The quota allocation is as follows:

| Event | 10 m air rifle | 50 m rifle three positions |
|---|---|---|
| South American Games | Argentina; Argentina | Argentina |
| Central American and Caribbean Games | Mexico; El Salvador | Cuba |
| Pan American Championships | United States; United States; Mexico; Peru; Cuba; Guatemala; Puerto Rico; Guatemala; Cuba; Peru; Chile; Brazil; Chile; El Salvador; Puerto Rico; Brazil; Canada | United States; United States; Guatemala; Guatemala; Mexico; Canada; Mexico; El Salvador; Ecuador; Brazil; Peru; Brazil; Ecuador; Canada; Bolivia |
| Host | | |
| Wild card | | |
| TOTAL | 21 | ~~18~~ 17 |

- Only 15 eligible athletes shot in the 50 m rifle three positions event at the Pan American Championships, meaning this spot will be reallocated.

=== Shotgun events ===
The quota allocation is as follows:

| Event | Trap | Skeet |
|---|---|---|
| South American Games | Chile; Bolivia | Brazil |
| Central American and Caribbean Games | Mexico; Mexico | —N/a |
| Pan American Championships | United States; United States; Guatemala; Guatemala; Canada; Canada; Puerto Rico; Peru; Puerto Rico; Brazil | United States; United States; Chile; Argentina; Mexico; Peru; Mexico; Barbados; Brazil; Guatemala |
| Host | | |
| Wild card | | |
| TOTAL | ~~18~~ 14 | ~~14~~ 11 |

- Women's skeet was not held at the Central American and Caribbean Games
- Only 10 eligible athletes competed in trap and skeet at the Pan American Championships.
