= Shooting at the 2023 Pan American Games – Men's 50 metre rifle three positions =

Men's 50 metre rifle three positions at the 2023 Pan American Games
- Venue: Polígono de tiro de Pudahuel
- Dates: October 27
- Competitors: 22 from 12 nations
- Winning score: 452.1

Medalists
Gold medal	Carlos Quezada	Mexico
Silver medal	Timothy Sherry	United States
Bronze medal	Lucas Kozeniesky	United States

The men's 50 metre rifle three positions competition of the shooting events at the 2023 Pan American Games was held on October 27 at Polígono de tiro de Pudahuel Santiago, Chile.

== Schedule ==
Date	Time	Round
October 27, 2023	09:00	Qualification
October 27, 2023	11:30	Final

== Results ==
=== Qualification round ===
The highest eight scores advance to the final.

Rank	Athlete	Country	1	2	Sub Total	Total	Notes
1	Timothy Sherry	United States	100; 100; 96	98; 99; 97	198; 199; 193	590-32x	Q, QPR
2	Lucas Kozeniesky	United States	99; 100; 97	99; 98; 95	198; 198; 192	588-30x	Q
3	Cassio De Mello	Brazil	96; 100; 96	100; 100; 93	196; 200; 189	585-28x	Q
4	Carlos Quezada	Mexico	97; 99; 94	97; 97; 96	194; 196; 190	580-29x	Q
5	Tye Ikeda	Canada	97; 98; 96	96; 97; 95	193; 195; 191	579-25x	Q
6	Rainier Quintanilla	Cuba	95; 98; 96	96; 96; 96	191; 194; 192	577-20x	Q
7	Alexis Eberhardt	Argentina	96; 99; 93	97; 98; 93	193; 197; 186	576-25x	Q
8	Cristian Morales	Peru	97; 98; 94	96; 99; 91	193; 197; 185	575-19x	Q
9	Eduardo Sampaio	Brazil	96; 99; 88	98; 99; 94	194; 198; 182	574-28x	
10	Israel Gutierrez	El Salvador	96; 97; 92	98; 98; 93	194; 195; 185	574-22x	
11	Daniel Vizcarra	Peru	96; 96; 91	96; 99; 95	192; 195; 186	573-21x	
12	Douglas Oliva	Independent Athletes Team	94; 98; 96	95; 98; 92	189; 196; 188	573-19x	
13	Grzegorz Sych	Canada	96; 99; 91	96; 99; 91	192; 198; 182	572-28x	
14	Carlos Quintero	Mexico	96; 97; 93	91; 99; 96	187; 196; 189	572-17x	
15	Marcelo Zoccali	Argentina	96; 99; 92	95; 97; 92	191; 196; 184	571-25x	
16	Julio Iemma	Venezuela	95; 99; 91	93; 98; 94	188; 197; 195	570-22x	
17	Alexander Molerio	Cuba	92; 96; 92	95; 98; 95	187; 194; 187	568-20x	
18	Anyelo Parada	Chile	92; 96; 89	94; 98; 93	190; 194; 182	566-22x	
19	Cristóbal Robles	Chile	93; 98; 92	91; 99; 89	184; 197; 181	562-20x	
20	Allan Márquez	Independent Athletes Team	89; 97; 89	93; 97; 89	182; 194; 178	554-12x	
21	Jhon Hurtado	Ecuador	91; 90; 90	89; 90; 76	180; 180; 166	526-7x	
	Diego Santamaría	El Salvador	did not start				

=== Final ===
The results were as follows:

Rank	Athlete	Country	1st Stage		2nd Stage						Total	Notes
1st place, gold medalist(s)	Carlos Quezada	Mexico	149.9; 50.6; 48.2; 51.1	302.6; 50.6; 52.5; 49.6	402.0; 49.9; 49.5	411.9; 9.9	422.4; 10.5	431.8; 9.4	442.4; 10.6	9.7	452.1	
2nd place, silver medalist(s)	Timothy Sherry	United States	151.5; 51.9; 49.2; 50.4	305.9; 51.6; 51.3; 51.5	399.1; 46.7; 46.5	409.5; 10.4	419.4; 9.9	429.3; 9.9	440.0; 10.7	9.5	449.5	
3rd place, bronze medalist(s)	Lucas Kozeniesky	United States	150.7; 49.1; 50.9; 50.7	302.8; 48.4; 51.5; 52.6	400.6; 47.1; 50.7	410.1; 9.5	418.9; 8.8	428.7; 9.8	10.1		438.8	
4	Tye Ikeda	Canada	148.3; 50.3; 48.1; 49.9	302.2; 51.2; 50.5; 52.2	397.9; 47.9; 47.9	407.5; 9.6	417.1; 9.6	8.6			425.7	
5	Alexis Eberhardt	Argentina	148.1; 46.9; 50.1; 51.1	297.0; 50.3; 49.4; 49.2	393.8; 47.4; 49.4	404.3; 10.5	9.7				414.0	
6	Rainier Quintanilla	Cuba	147.6; 48.9; 50.5; 48.2	295.5; 49.3; 49.7; 48.9	394.3; 50.6; 48.2	9.9					404.2	
7	Cassio De Mello	Brazil	148.2; 50.3; 48.5; 49.4	300.5; 48.6; 52.3; 51.4	44.4; 48.0						392.9	
8	Cristian Morales	Peru	147.4; 48.7; 50.8; 47.9	298.6; 48.4; 52.0; 50.8	48.6; 44.8						392.0'	
