= Shooting at the 2024 Summer Olympics – Women's skeet =

Olympic shooting event

Women's skeet at the Games of the XXXIII Olympiad
- Olympic shooting pictogram
- Venue: Chateauroux Shooting Centre
- Dates: 3–4 August
- Competitors: 29 from 23 nations

Medalists
1st place, gold medalist(s)		Francisca Crovetto	Chile
2nd place, silver medalist(s)		Amber Rutter	Great Britain
3rd place, bronze medalist(s)		Austen Smith	United States

The women's skeet event at the 2024 Summer Olympics took place on 3 and 4 August 2024 at the Chateauroux Shooting Ctr.

== Records ==
Prior to this competition, the existing world and Olympic records were as follows.

Qualification records
World record	Francisca Crovetto Chadid (CHI)	125	Lonato, Italy	27 April 2022
Olympic record	Wei Meng (CHN)	124	Tokyo, Japan	26 July 2021

== Schedule ==
All times are Central European Summer Time (UTC+2)

Date	Time	Round
Friday, 3 August 2024; Saturday, 4 August 2024	9:00; 9:30	Qualification
Saturday, 4 August 2024	15:30	Final

== Results ==
=== Qualification ===
Rank	Athlete	Country	1	2	3	4	5	Total	Shoot-off	Notes
1	Austen Smith	United States	25	23	25	25	24	122	+14	Q
2	Amber Rutter	Great Britain	25	25	24	24	24	122	+13	Q
3	Emmanouela Katzouraki	Greece	24	24	24	25	25	122	+1	Q
4	Vanesa Hocková	Slovakia	24	24	23	25	25	121		Q
5	Francisca Crovetto	Chile	25	24	23	24	24	120	+8	Q
6	Danka Barteková	Slovakia	24	24	24	24	24	120	+7 + 2	Q
7	Gabriela Rodriguez	Mexico	24	25	24	24	23	120	+7 + 0	
8	Nele Wißmer	Germany	25	24	25	23	23	120	+5	
9	Lucie Anastassiou	France	24	24	22	25	24	119		
10	Jiang Yiting	China	24	24	23	24	24	119		
11	Victoria Larsson	Sweden	20	24	25	24	25	118		
12	Dania Vizzi	United States	20	24	25	24	25	118		
13	Wei Meng	China	25	25	20	24	24	118		
14	Maheshwari Chauhan	India	23	24	24	25	22	118		
15	Diana Bacosi	Italy	22	24	22	25	24	117		
16	Martina Bartolomei	Italy	22	25	22	25	23	117		
17	Nadine Messerschmidt	Germany	23	24	22	25	23	117		
18	Assem Orynbay	Kazakhstan	22	22	23	24	25	116		
19	Daniella Borda	Peru	23	23	23	24	23	116		
20	Konstantina Nikolaou	Cyprus	23	24	24	22	23	116		
21	Jang Kook-hee	South Korea	24	24	23	22	22	115		
22	Barbora Šumová	Czech Republic	23	24	23	22	22	114		
23	Raiza Dhillon	India	21	22	23	23	24	113		
24	Iryna Malovichko	Ukraine	23	23	22	22	23	113		
25	Aislin Jones	Australia	23	21	23	23	22	112		
26	Georgia Furquim	Brazil	21	23	21	22	24	111		
27	Sena Can	Turkey	19	23	23	22	23	110		
28	Chloe Tipple	New Zealand	23	22	20	20	23	108		
29	Amira Aboushokka	Egypt	20	21	21	22	23	107		

=== Final ===
Rank	Athlete	Series						Notes
Rank	Athlete	1	2	3	4	5	6	Notes
1st place, gold medalist(s)	Francisca Crovetto (CHI)	9	19	29	38	48	55	SO:+7
2nd place, silver medalist(s)	Amber Rutter (GBR)	10	19	28	37	46	55	SO:+6
3rd place, bronze medalist(s)	Austen Smith (USA)	9	18	27	36	45		
4	Vanesa Hocková (SVK)	10	17	26	34			
5	Emmanouela Katzouraki (GRE)	7	17	23				
6	Danka Barteková (SVK)	9	17					
