= Minden Miles =

American sport shooter (born 1996)

Personal information
- Nickname: "Mindy"
- Nationality: American
- Born: May 22, 1996 (age 30)
- Height: 5 ft 10 in (178 cm)

Sport
- Country: United States
- Sport: Shooting
Medal record
Women's shooting
Representing United States
Pan American Games
| Silver medal – second place | 2019 Lima | 10 m air rifle |
| Silver medal – second place | 2019 Lima | Mixed 10 m air rifle |

Minden Miles (born May 22, 1996) is an American sport shooter. She won the silver medal in the women's 10 metres air rifle event at the 2019 Pan American Games held in Lima, Peru. She also won the silver medal in the mixed 10 metres air rifle event together with Lucas Kozeniesky.

In 2018, she won three gold medals at the Shooting Championships of the Americas held in Guadalajara, Mexico.
