= Shooting at the 2023 Pan American Games – Women's trap =

Women's trap at the 2023 Pan American Games
- Venue: Polígono de tiro de Pudahuel
- Dates: October 25 - October 26
- Competitors: 17 from 10 nations

Medalists
Gold medal	Adriana Ruano	Independent Athletes Team
Silver medal	Waleska Soto	Independent Athletes Team
Bronze medal	Rachel Tozier	United States

The women's trap competition of the shooting events at the 2023 Pan American Games was held from October 25 to 26 at Polígono de Tiro de Pudahuel in Santiago, Chile.

== Schedule ==
Date	Time	Round
October 25, 2023	09:30	Qualification - Day 1
October 26, 2023	09:30	Qualification - Day 2
October 26, 2023	15:00	Final

== Results ==
=== Qualification round ===
The best six scores advance to the final.

Rank	Athlete	Country	1	2	3	4	5	Total	Notes
1	Rachel Tozier	United States	23	24	23	22	23	115	Q
2	Waleska Soto	Independent Athletes Team	24	23	24	21	23	115	Q
3	Augusta Campos-Martyn	Puerto Rico	23	23	24	20	22	112	Q
4	Adriana Ruano	Independent Athletes Team	25	23	22	20	21	111	Q
5	Alicia Gough	United States	21	22	23	24	20	110	Q
6	Madelene Scola	Canada	22	23	20	20	22	107	Q
7	Alejandra Ramírez	Mexico	18	24	23	20	22	107	
8	Camilla Cosmoski	Brazil	21	21	23	19	20	104	
9	Pamela Salman	Chile	24	21	22	18	19	104	
10	Valentina Porcella	Peru	24	19	19	24	18	104	
11	Ana Bermudez	Puerto Rico	19	21	21	22	20	103	
12	Alessia de Barbieri	Chile	20	19	22	21	20	102	
13	Victoria Antopia	Mexico	17	20	23	15	19	94	
14	Daiana Dos Santos	Brazil	17	19	14	17	20	87	
15	Lindsay Boddez	Canada	16	17	15	20	17	85	
16	Helena Farres	Paraguay	16	18	16	17	16	83	
17	Madeleine Velasco	Bolivia	19	19	14	13	13	78	

=== Final ===
The results were as follows:

Rank	Athlete	Country	Total	Notes
1st place, gold medalist(s)	Adriana Ruano	Independent Athletes Team	38	
2nd place, silver medalist(s)	Waleska Soto	Independent Athletes Team	36	
3rd place, bronze medalist(s)	Rachel Tozier	United States	28	
4	Alicia Gough	United States	23	
5	Augusta Campos-Martyn	Puerto Rico	18	
6	Madelene Scola	Canada	11	
