= Shooting at the 2013 Bolivarian Games =

Shooting (Spanish: Tiro Deportivo), for the 2013 Bolivarian Games, took place from 17 November to 23 November 2013.

== Medal table ==
Key:

* Host nation (Peru)

Rank	Nation	Gold	Silver	Bronze	Total
1	Venezuela (VEN)	9	8	6	23
2	Guatemala (GUA)	6	6	6	18
3	Peru (PER)*	5	8	9	22
4	Chile (CHI)	4	4	1	9
5	El Salvador (ESA)	4	0	2	6
6	Ecuador (ECU)	2	5	1	8
7	Bolivia (BOL)	2	1	2	5
8	Dominican Republic (DOM)	1	0	2	3
9	Colombia (COL)	0	1	3	4
Totals (9 entries)		33	33	32	98

== Medal summary ==
=== Men ===
Event	Gold		Silver		Bronze	
10 metre air pistol individual	Rudolf Knijnenburg Cordero (BOL)	200.0	Fran Alexander Bonilla Colmenares (VEN)	196.0	Martin Ivan Galvez Boluarte (PER)	176.5
10 metre air pistol team	Venezuela; Edilio Centeno; Fran Alexander Bonilla Colmenares; Felipe Beuvrin Jelambi	1703	Guatemala; Romeo Maximiliano Cruz Lemus; Jose Pablo Vidal Castillo Aguilar; Sergio Werner Sanchez Gomez	1699	Peru; Pedro Garcia Miro; Enrique Luis Arnaez Braschi; Martin Ivan Galvez Boluarte	1678
10 metre air rifle individual	Cristian Jaime Morales Bustos (BOL)	201.8	Octavio Augusto Sandoval Guerrero (GUA)	198.9	Julio Cesar Iemma Hernandez (VEN)	177.5
10 metre air rifle team	Chile; Elias Roberto San Martin Oñatt; Mauricio Andres Huerta Garcia; Gonzalo Andres Moncada Zilleruelo	1817.4	Venezuela; Julio Cesar Iemma Hernandez; Raul Alejandro Vargas Ledezma; Leonardo Rodriguez	1815.6	Guatemala; Octavio Augusto Sandoval Guerrero; Kenny Eduardo Matta Alvarado; Allan Fernando Chinchilla Perez	1814.5
25 metre center-fire pistol individual	Edilio Centeno (VEN)	573	Felipe Beuvrin Jelambi (VEN)	572	Sergio Werner Sanchez Gomez (GUA)	569
25 metre center-fire pistol team	Venezuela; Douglas Enrique Gomez Salazar; Felipe Beuvrin Jelambi; Edilio Centeno	1780	Peru; Enrique Luis Arnaez Braschi; Pedro Garcia Miro; Viktor Preciado Rojas	1640	Bolivia; Victor Gabriel Garcia Arispe; Rudolf Knijnenburg Cordero; Alvaro Garcia Kradolfer	1637
25 metre rapid fire pistol individual	Douglas Enrique Gomez Salazar (VEN)	20	Franco Di Mauro Fruscella (VEN)	19	Felipe Beuvrin Jelambi (VEN)	16
25 metre rapid fire pistol team	Venezuela; Douglas Enrique Gomez Salazar; Franco Di Mauro Fruscella; Felipe Beuvrin Jelambi	1673	Peru; Marko Antonio Carrillo Zevallos; Pedro Garcia Miro; Marco Antonio Carrillo Palomino	1618	El Salvador; Julio Tirso Molina Garcia; Hermes Alejandro Barahona Salmeron; Carlos Antonio Hernandez Barba Mort	1605
50 metre pistol individual	Mario Enrique Vinueza Delgado (ECU)	188.6	Rudolf Knijnenburg Cordero (BOL)	185.4	Sergio Werner Sanchez Gomez (GUA)	165.5
50 metre pistol team	Guatemala; Marvin Abelardo Herrera Chon; Sergio Werner Sanchez Gomez; Jose Pablo Vidal Castillo Aguilar	1618	Ecuador; Anthony Darwin Muñoz Choez; Fernando Esteban Pozo Neira; Mario Enrique Vinueza Delgado	1596	Bolivia; José Ernesto Arias Aguilera; Rudolf Knijnenburg Cordero; Gabriel Marco Chambi Mejía	1580
50 metre rifle prone individual	Julio Cesar Iemma Hernandez (VEN)	204.9	Raul Alejandro Vargas Ledezma (VEN)	201.5	Octavio Augusto Sandoval Guerrero (GUA)	181.7
50 metre rifle prone team	Guatemala; Octavio Augusto Sandoval Guerrero; Marlon Rolando Perez Rodriguez; Allan Fernando Chinchilla Perez	1819.2	Peru; Daniel Eduardo Vizcarra Gallegos; Miguel Alonso Mejia Miranda; Guido Eliseo Farfan Moretti	1809.9	Chile; Elias Roberto San Martin Oñatt; Gonzalo Andres Moncada Zilleruelo; Mauricio Andres Huerta Garcia	1808.6
50 metre rifle three positions X 40 individual	Elias Roberto San Martin Oñatt (CHI)	447.3	Gonzalo Andres Moncada Zilleruelo (CHI)	440.9	Martrin Gutierrez (VEN)	430.0
50 metre rifle three positions X 40 team	Chile; Marcos Antonio Huerta Garcia; Gonzalo Andres Moncada Zilleruelo; Elias Roberto San Martin Oñatt	3416	Venezuela; Julio Cesar Iemma Hernandez; Martrin Gutierrez; Daniel Alejandro Da Silva Garcia	3402	Guatemala; Allan Fernando Chinchilla Perez; Marlon Rolando Perez Rodriguez; Octavio Augusto Sandoval Guerrero	3386
Skeet individual	Nicolás Pacheco (PER)	n/a	Jorge Nicolas Atalah Moya (CHI)	n/a	Marco Rodolfo Matellini Walker (PER)	n/a
Skeet team	Venezuela; Victor Silva Datica; Victor Manuel Silva Vega; Lucio Gomez Garcia	347	Chile; Jorge Nicolas Atalah Moya; Marcelo Yamal Yarad Jadue; Nicolas Andres Massoud Buschmann	345	Peru; Marco Rodolfo Matellini Walker; Nicolás Pacheco; Khalid Qahhat Metwasi	343
75 Sporting clays individual	Alessandro de Souza Ferreira (PER)	n/a	Nicolás Pacheco (PER)	n/a	Diego Duarte (COL)	n/a
75 sporting clays team	Peru; Alessandro de Souza Ferreira; Nicolás Pacheco; Juan Fernando Villanueva Torres	202	Colombia; Andres Augusto Palacios Vergara; Diego Duarte; Alejandro Bravo Trujillo	197	Venezuela; Lucio Gomez Garcia; Marcello Dionisi; Rodolfo De Andreis	192
Trap individual	Sergio Piñero (DOM)	14	Jean Pierre Brol (GUA)	12	Danilo Caro (COL)	n/a
Trap team	Peru; Alessandro de Souza Ferreira; Asier Josu Cilloniz Parodi; Nicolás Pacheco	340	Guatemala; Dany Enrique Brol Blanco; Jean Pierre Brol Cardenas; Hebert Danilo Brol Cardenas	337	Dominican Republic; Sergio Piñero; Domingo Nicolas Lorenzo; Eduardo Lorenzo	334
Double trap individual	Fernando Brol Cardenas (GUA)	27	Alessandro de Souza Ferreira (PER)	24	Sergio Piñero (DOM)	n/a
Double trap team	Venezuela; Humberto Oliviero Nouel; Franco Di Mauro Fruscella; Ricardo Cortina	357	Guatemala; Dany Enrique Brol Blanco; Hebert Danilo Brol Cardenas; Fernando Enrique Brol Cardenas	346	Colombia; Hernando Vega Camerano; Diego Duarte; Danilo Caro	339

=== Women ===
Event	Gold		Silver		Bronze	
10 metre air pistol individual	Diana Aurora Osorio Paz (PER)	194.7	Andrea Marina Perez Peña (ECU)	193.4	Diana Cristina Durango Flores (ECU)	174.1
10 metre air pistol team	Guatemala; Lucia Del Rosario Menendez; Delmi Roxana Cruz Monzon; Geraldine Kate Solorzano Manson	1115	Ecuador; Andrea Marina Perez Peña; Diana Cristina Durango Flores; Jenny Alexandra Bedoya Barrera	1107	Peru; Diana Aurora Osorio Paz; Miriam Mariana Quintanilla Camargo; Brianda Nicole Rivera Villegas	1090
10 metre air rifle individual	Melissa Ivette Perez Mikec (ESA)	201.4	Gabriela Belén Lobos Plaza (CHI)	201.3	Diliana Carolina Mendez Ceballos (VEN)	180.1
10 metre air rifle team	El Salvador; Johanna Elizabeth Pineda De Mejia; Melissa Ivette Perez Mikec; Veronica Esenia Rivas Escobar	1217.2	Guatemala; Gabriela Alexandra Cruz Villagran; Edna Yessenia Monzon Villatoro; Polymaria Velasquez Alvarado	1204.8	Peru; Karina Paola Rodriguez Loayza; Sara Gabriela Vizcarra Gallegos; Alexia Carolina Arenas Paredes	1203.4
25 metre pistol individual	Diana Cristina Durango Flores (ECU)	n/a	Andrea Marina Perez Peña (ECU)	n/a	Delmi Roxana Cruz Monzon (GUA)	n/a
25 metre pistol team	Guatemala; Lucia Del Rosario Menendez; Delmi Roxana Cruz Monzon; Geraldine Kate Solorzano Manson	1683	Ecuador; Diana Cristina Durango Flores; Andrea Marina Perez Peña; Jenny Alexandra Bedoya Barrera	1658	Venezuela; Editzy Auxiliadora Pimentel Guevara; Lenny Melina Estevez Cesar; Maurilay Carolina Morillo Bravo	1656
50 metre rifle prone individual	Johanna Elizabeth Pineda De Mejia (ESA)	586	Diliana Carolina Mendez Ceballos (VEN)	581	Karina Paola Rodriguez Loayza (PER)	580
50 metre rifle prone team	El Salvador; Johanna Elizabeth Pineda De Mejia; Ana Elizabeth Ramirez Henriquez; Melissa Ivette Perez Mikec	1729	Venezuela; Diliana Carolina Mendez Ceballos; Dairene Marquez; Osmery Garcia	1728	Peru; Karina Paola Rodriguez Loayza; Sara Gabriela Vizcarra Gallegos; Alexia Carolina Arenas Paredes	1721
50 metre rifle three positions X 20 individual	Diliana Carolina Mendez Ceballos (VEN)	432.9	Sara Gabriela Vizcarra Gallegos (PER)	431.6	Karina Paola Rodriguez Loayza (PER)	420.3
50 metre rifle three positions X 20 team	Guatemala; Maria De Lourdes Guerra Alvarado; Edna Yessenia Monzon Villatoro; Polymaria Velasquez Alvarado	1674	Peru; Alexia Carolina Arenas Paredes	1673	El Salvador; Melissa Ivette Perez Mikec; Johanna Elizabeth Pineda De Mejia; Veronica Esenia Rivas Escobar	1668
Skeet individual	Francisca Crovetto (CHI)	70	Daniella Borda (PER)	58	Not awarded	n/a
