= Sundermann =

Sundermann is a German surname. Notable people with the surname include:

- Axel Sundermann (born 1968), German footballer
- Collette Sunderman (born 1959), American director
- Jürgen Sundermann (1940–2022), German footballer
- Patrick Sunderman (born 1994), American sports shooter
