= Derek Haldeman =

American sport shooter (born 1991)

Personal information
- Nationality: American
- Born: June 24, 1991 (age 35)
- Height: 6 ft 0 in (183 cm)

Sport
- Country: United States
- Sport: Shooting
- Event: Trap
Medal record
Men's shooting
Representing United States
Pan American Games
| Gold medal – first place | 2019 Lima | Trap mixed team |
| Silver medal – second place | 2019 Lima | Trap |
World Championships
| Gold medal – first place | 2023 Baku | Trap team |
| Bronze medal – third place | 2017 Moscow | Trap mixed team |

Derek Haldeman (born June 24, 1991) is an American sport shooter. He won the silver medal in the men's trap event at the 2019 Pan American Games held in Lima, Peru. He also won the gold medal in the mixed trap event together with Ashley Carroll.
