= Rachel Tozier =

American sport shooter (born 1992)

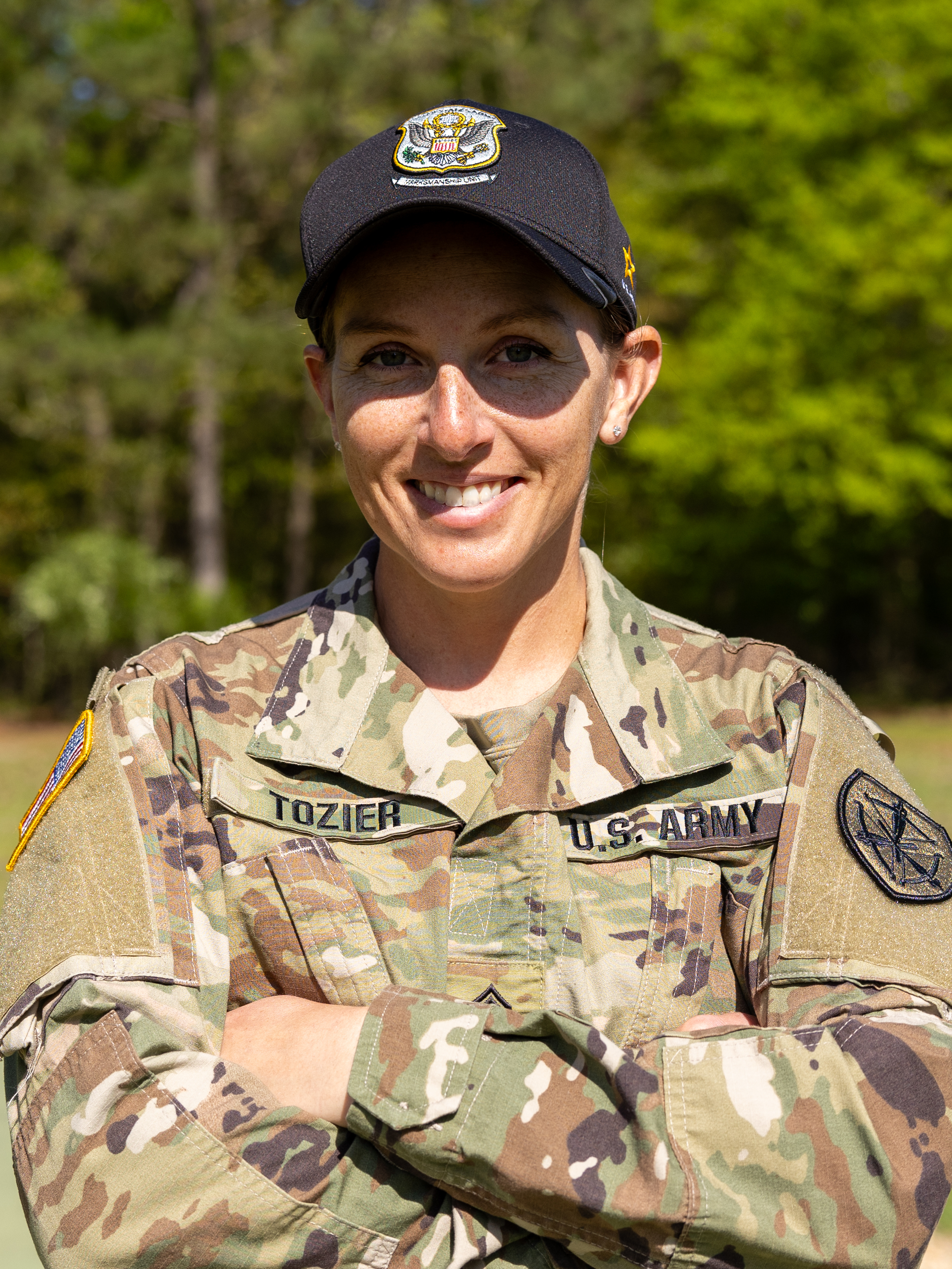
- Tozier at Fort Moore in 2024

Personal information
- Full name: Rachel Leighanne Tozier
- Nationality: American
- Born: April 1, 1992 (age 34) Liberty, Missouri
- Home town: Pattonsburg, Missouri
- Education: University of Central Missouri; American Military University

Sport
- Country: United States
- Sport: Shooting
- Event: Trap
Medal record
Women's shooting
Representing United States
Pan American Games
Silver medal – second place	2019 Lima	Trap
Silver medal – second place	2019 Lima	Mixed trap
Bronze medal – third place	2023 Santiago	Trap
World Championships
Gold medal – first place	2019 Lonato del Garda	Trap team
Silver medal – second place	2023 Baku	Trap mixed team

Rachel Leighanne Tozier (born April 1, 1992) is an American sport shooter. She won the silver medal in the women's trap event at the 2019 Pan American Games held in Lima, Peru. She also won the silver medal in the mixed trap event together with Brian Burrows. She participated in the women's trap event at the 2024 Summer Olympics, where she placed 18th.
