= Shooting at the 2015 Pan American Games – Men's 10 metre air rifle =

Shooting – Men's 10 metre air rifle at the 2015 Pan American Games
- Venue: Pan Am Shooting Centre
- Dates: July 13
- Competitors: 24 from 15 nations
- Winning score: 202.5

Medalists
| Gold medal | Connor Davis | United States |
| Silver medal | Julio Iemma | Venezuela |
| Bronze medal | Bryant Wallizer | United States |

The men's 10 metre air rifle shooting event at the 2015 Pan American Games will be held on July 13 at the Pan Am Shooting Centre in Innisfil.

The event consisted of two rounds: a qualifier and a final. In the qualifier, each shooter fired 60 shots with an air rifle at 10 metres distance from the standing position. Scores for each shot were in increments of 1, with a maximum score of 10.

The top 8 shooters in the qualifying round moved on to the final round. There, they fired an additional 10 shots. These shots scored in increments of .1, with a maximum score of 10.9. The total score from all 70 shots was used to determine final ranking.

The winners of all fifteen events, along with the runner up in the men's air rifle, skeet, trap and both women's rifle events will qualify for the 2016 Summer Olympics in Rio de Janeiro, Brazil (granted the athlete has not yet earned a quota for their country).

== Schedule ==
All times are Central Standard Time (UTC-6).

| Date | Time | Round |
|---|---|---|
| July 13, 2015 | 9:15 | Qualification |
| July 13, 2015 | 13:00 | Final |

== Results ==
=== Qualification round ===
| Rank | Athlete | Country | 1 | 2 | 3 | 4 | 5 | 6 | Total | Notes |
|---|---|---|---|---|---|---|---|---|---|---|
| 1 | Bryant Wallizer | United States | 104.4 | 104.6 | 105.3 | 103.1 | 105.0 | 102.5 | 624.9 | Q, PR |
| 2 | Valentin Cabrera | Argentina | 103.2 | 103.7 | 102.8 | 101.6 | 103.6 | 103.6 | 618.5 | Q |
| 3 | Connor Davis | United States | 102.8 | 102.7 | 101.2 | 101.9 | 104.8 | 102.8 | 616.2 | Q |
| 4 | Luis Morales | Mexico | 103.8 | 101.1 | 102.8 | 103.9 | 102.0 | 102.1 | 615.7 | Q |
| 5 | Julio Iemma | Venezuela | 102.7 | 101.6 | 100.5 | 104.1 | 102.5 | 103.5 | 614.9 | Q |
| 6 | Bruno Heck | Brazil | 98.3 | 102.9 | 103.5 | 103.4 | 103.4 | 102.8 | 614.3 | Q |
| 7 | Anyelo Parada | Chile | 101.8 | 103.0 | 101.5 | 102.1 | 102.6 | 101.3 | 612.3 | Q |
| 8 | Luis Madrazo | Mexico | 100.7 | 99.8 | 102.6 | 103.2 | 103.2 | 101.5 | 611.0 | Q |
| 9 | Reinier Estpinan | Cuba | 102.2 | 102.3 | 100.9 | 101.3 | 100.8 | 102.2 | 609.7 | |
| 10 | Daniel Vizcarra | Peru | 99.5 | 101.0 | 101.5 | 102.0 | 103.2 | 101.5 | 608.7 | |
| 11 | Octavio Sandoval | Guatemala | 99.5 | 101.4 | 101.1 | 101.9 | 103.6 | 101.0 | 608.5 | |
| 12 | Benjamin Taylor | Canada | 102.6 | 100.5 | 102.4 | 100.1 | 101.2 | 101.6 | 608.4 | |
| 13 | Alexander Molerio | Cuba | 98.6 | 99.7 | 103.0 | 101.3 | 102.1 | 102.5 | 607.2 | |
| 14 | Israel Gutierrez | El Salvador | 101.6 | 99.7 | 100.5 | 99.4 | 102.9 | 102.9 | 607.0 | |
| 15 | Cristian Santacruz | Ecuador | 103.8 | 100.5 | 100.0 | 100.2 | 102.1 | 100.3 | 606.9 | |
| 16 | Cristian Morales | Bolivia | 100.7 | 101.9 | 99.7 | 100.2 | 101.3 | 101.9 | 605.7 | |
| 17 | Leonardo Moreira | Brazil | 98.3 | 102.6 | 101.2 | 102.6 | 101.6 | 97.8 | 604.1 | |
| 18 | Cory Niefer | Canada | 98.6 | 101.0 | 101.4 | 101.4 | 98.8 | 101.4 | 602.6 | |
| 19 | Oliser Zelaya | El Salvador | 100.3 | 101.1 | 100.5 | 100.3 | 99.3 | 100.4 | 601.9 | |
| 20 | Elias San Martin | Chile | 100.7 | 99.3 | 98.7 | 101.4 | 101.9 | 99.0 | 601.0 | |
| 21 | Hosman Duran | Dominican Republic | 93.4 | 87.4 | 93.3 | 90.6 | 89.8 | 92.2 | 546.7 | |
| 22 | Yerald Canda | Nicaragua | 89.0 | 91.5 | 89.5 | 90.6 | 89.1 | 93.7 | 543.4 | |
| | Kenny Matta | Guatemala | | | | | | | DSQ | |
| | Marcelo Zoccali | Argentina | | | | | | | DNS | |

=== Final ===
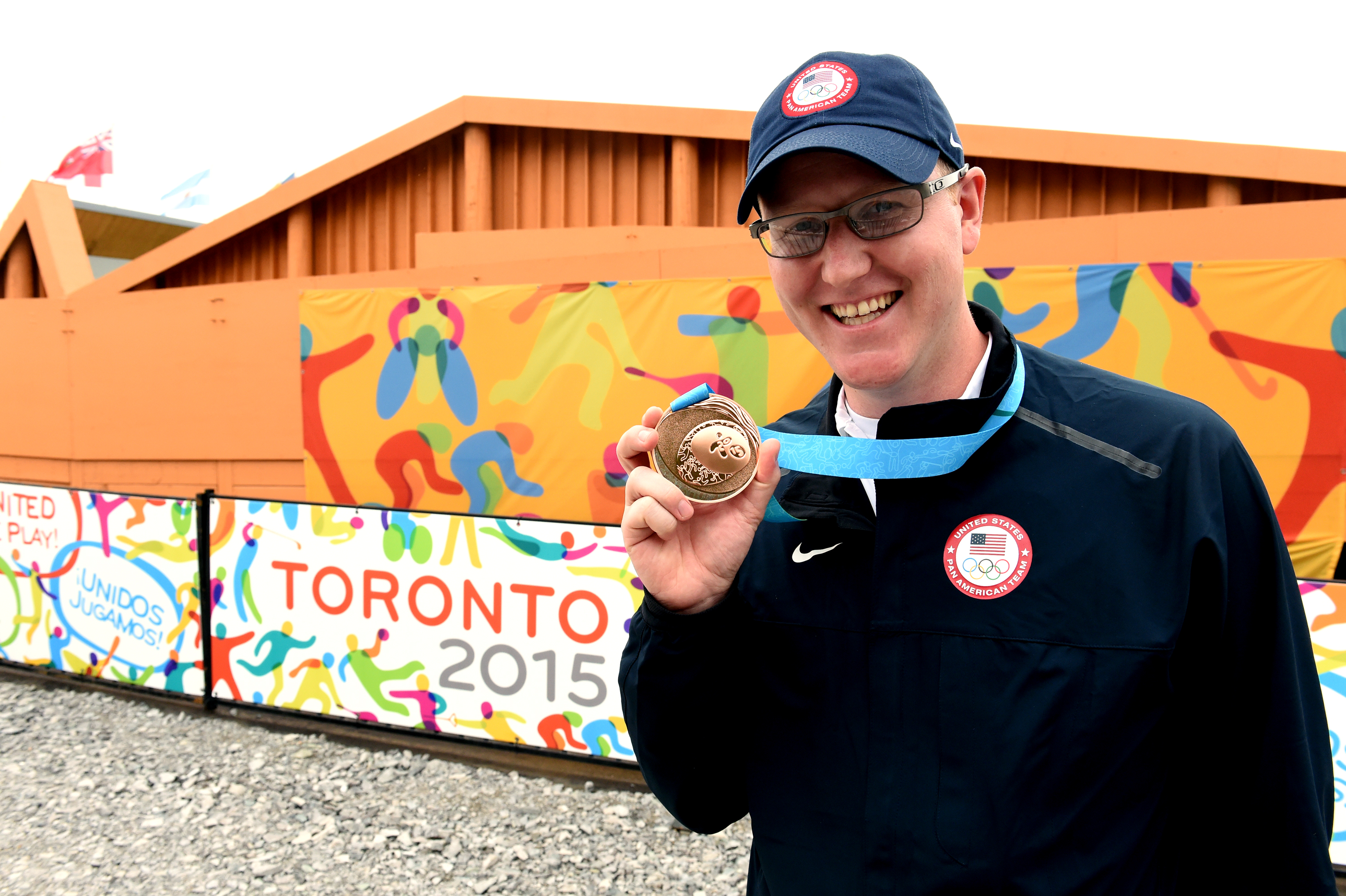
Bryant Wallizer of the United States holding the bronze medal he won in the men's 10 metre air rifle event

| Rank | Athlete | Country | 1 | 2 | 3 | 4 | 5 | 6 | 7 | 8 | 9 | Total | Notes |
|---|---|---|---|---|---|---|---|---|---|---|---|---|---|
| 1st place, gold medalist(s) | Connor Davis | United States | 30.6; 10.6; 9.9; 10.1 | 61.5; 10.1; 10.0; 10.8 | 81.0; 9.6; 9.9 | 101.9; 10.7; 10.2 | 122.7; 10.2; 10.6 | 143.4; 10.3; 10.4 | 163.8; 9.6; 10.8 | 183.0; 9.2; 10.0 | 202.5; 9.2; 10.3 | 202.5 | FPR |
| 2nd place, silver medalist(s) | Julio Iemma | Venezuela | 31.0; 10.7; 10.0; 10.3 | 61.8; 10.1; 10.2; 10.5 | 82.7; 10.3; 10.6 | 102.1; 9.3; 10.1 | 122.6; 9.8; 10.7 | 142.8; 9.8; 10.4 | 162.4; 9.6; 10.0 | 182.3; 10.5; 9.4 | 202.2; 9.8; 10.1 | 202.2 | |
| 3rd place, bronze medalist(s) | Bryant Wallizer | United States | 30.8; 9.7; 10.7; 10.4 | 60.5; 10.1; 9.4; 10.2 | 80.3; 10.0; 9.8 | 100.0; 9.6; 10.1 | 121.1; 10.5; 10.6 | 140.5; 10.2; 9.2 | 160.7; 10.6; 9.6 | 180.8; 10.2; 9.9 | 180.8 | 180.8 | |
| 4 | Bruno Heck | Brazil | 30.9; 10.7; 10.4; 9.8 | 60.3; 10.5; 10.4; 8.5 | 80.3; 10.0; 10.0 | 100.8; 10.2; 10.3 | 120.7; 9.4; 10.5 | 140.2; 10.5; 9.0 | 160.3; 9.8; 10.3 | 160.3 | 160.3 | 160.3 | |
| 5 | Luis Morales | Mexico | 30.3; 10.1; 9.9; 10.3 | 60.9; 10.2; 10.5; 9.9 | 80.6; 9.6; 10.1 | 100.0; 9.9; 9.5 | 119.2; 9.5; 9.7 | 139.9; 10.3; 10.4 | 139.9 | 139.9 | 139.9 | 139.9 | |
| 6 | Anyelo Parada | Chile | 30.1; 9.8; 10.0; 10.3 | 59.7; 9.8; 9.6; 10.2 | 79.9; 10.0; 10.2 | 99.5; 9.3; 10.3 | 118.5; 8.7; 10.3 | 118.5 | 118.5 | 118.5 | 118.5 | 118.5 | |
| 7 | Luis Madrazo | Mexico | 28.6; 9.1; 8.9; 10.6 | 58.9; 10.1; 10.4; 9.8 | 79.6; 10.0; 10.7 | 98.8; 9.9; 9.3 | 98.8 | 98.8 | 98.8 | 98.8 | 98.8 | 98.8 | |
| 8 | Valentin Cabrera | Argentina | 29.8; 9.9; 10.3; 9.6 | 59.8; 9.9; 10.5; 9.6 | 79.4; 9.9; 9.7 | 79.4 | 79.4 | 79.4 | 79.4 | 79.4 | 79.4 | 79.4 | |
