= Austen Smith =

American sports shooter (born 2001)

Personal information
- Full name: Austen Jewell Smith
- Nationality: United States
- Born: July 23, 2001 (age 25)
- Home town: Keller, Texas, U.S.

Sport
- Country: United States
- Sport: Sport shooter
- Event: Skeet shooting
Medal record
Women's shooting
Representing the United States
Olympic Games
Silver medal – second place	2024 Paris	Skeet mixed team
Bronze medal – third place	2024 Paris	Skeet
Pan American Games
Bronze medal – third place	2023 Santiago	Mixed skeet
World Championships
Gold medal – first place	2019 Lonato	Team mixed skeet
Gold medal – first place	2022 Osijek	Team skeet
Gold medal – first place	2023 Baku	Team skeet
Gold medal – first place	2023 Baku	Skeet mixed team
Bronze medal – third place	2019 Lonato	Team skeet

Austen Jewell Smith (born July 23, 2001) is an American sports shooter and Olympian. She holds a silver and bronze medal in skeet from the 2024 Paris Olympics, alongside a gold medal from the 2021 ISSF World Cup Shotgun held in Lonato, Italy.

She was the youngest member of the US Olympic shooting team for the 2020 Summer Olympics. On August 4, 2024, she won the bronze medal in the women's skeet event at the 2024 Summer Olympics. Francisca Crovetto Chadid won the gold, beating the British Amber Rutter in a tiebreaker at the Chateauroux Shooting Center. She also won silver in the Mixed skeet event alongside Vincent Hancock.
