= Shooting at the 2010 South American Games – Women's skeet =

2010 event at the South American Games

The Women's skeet event at the 2010 South American Games was held on March 25 at 9:00.

== Medalists ==
Gold	Silver	Bronze
Francisca Crovetto; Chile	Melisa Gil; Argentina	Fabiola Andrea Espinoza; Chile

== Results ==
=== Qualification ===
Rank	Athlete	Series			Total
Rank	Athlete	1	2	3	Total
1	Francisca Crovetto (CHI)	23	22	20	65
2	Melisa Gil (ARG)	20	22	20	62
3	Fabiola Andrea Espinoza (CHI)	19	16	19	54
4	Olga Lucia Medina (COL)	14	11	7	32
5	Janice Teixeira (BRA)	6	7	5	18

==== Final ====
Rank	Athlete	Qual Score	Final Score	Total	Shoot-off
1st place, gold medalist(s)	Francisca Crovetto (CHI)	65	22	87	
2nd place, silver medalist(s)	Melisa Gil (ARG)	62	22	84	
3rd place, bronze medalist(s)	Fabiola Andrea Espinoza (CHI)	54	20	74	
4	Olga Lucia Medina (COL)	32	10	42	
