= Sarah Beard (sport shooter) =

American sport shooter (born 1991)

Personal information
- Nationality: American
- Born: May 21, 1991 (age 35)
- Height: 5 ft 8 in (173 cm)

Sport
- Country: United States
- Sport: Shooting
- Military career
- Allegiance: United States
- Branch: United States Army
- Service years: 2017–present
- Rank: Captain
Medal record
Women's shooting
Representing United States
World Championships
Gold medal – first place	2023 Baku	50 m rifle 3 positions team
Pan American Games
Gold medal – first place	2019 Lima	50 m rifle 3 positions
Bronze medal – third place	2011 Guadalajara	50 m rifle 3 positions

Sarah Beard (born May 21, 1991) is an American sport shooter. She won the silver medal in the women's 50 metres rifle three positions event at the 2019 Pan American Games held in Lima, Peru.

At the 2018 Shooting Championships of the Americas held in Guadalajara, Mexico, she won a total of five gold medals and one bronze medal.
