= Nick Mowrer =

American sport shooter (born 1988)

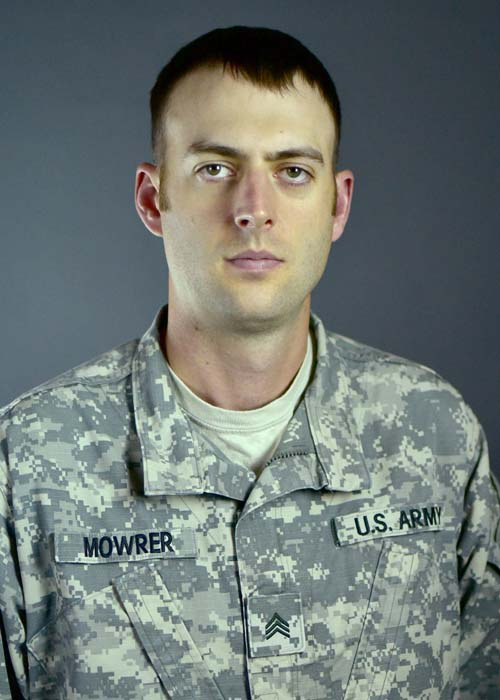
- Sgt Mowrer in 2017

Personal information
- Full name: Nickolaus Mowrer
- Nationality: American
- Born: September 14, 1988 (age 37) Miles City, Montana, U.S.
- Height: 6 ft 2 in (188 cm)
- Weight: 187 lb (85 kg)

Sport
- Country: United States
- Sport: Shooting
- Events: 10 m air pistol (AP60); 50 m pistol (FP)
- Club: U.S. Olympic Training Center; U.S. Army WCAP
- Coached by: Sergey Luzov
Medal record
Men's shooting
Representing the United States
Pan American Games
Silver medal – second place	2019 Lima	10 m air pistol
Silver medal – second place	2019 Lima	Mixed 10 m air pistol
Bronze medal – third place	2023 Santiago	Mixed 10 m air pistol

Nickolaus Mowrer (born September 14, 1988, in Miles City, Montana) is an American sport shooter. He is a three-time NRA Intercollegiate Pistol Champion in the free pistol (FP), a 2011 U.S. pistol shooting champion, and also, a resident athlete of the United States Olympic Training Center in Colorado Springs, Colorado, under his personal coach Sergey Luzov. At the 2011 Pan American Games in Guadalajara, Mexico, Mowrer missed out on a bronze medal by 5.5 points, finishing in 4th behind Júlio Almeida of Brazil in the men's free pistol, with a total score of 634.4 (545 in the preliminary rounds and 89.4 in the final).

Mowrer qualified for the men's 50 m pistol, along with his teammate Daryl Szarenski, at the 2012 Summer Olympics in London, after placing second and edging out former Olympian Brian Beaman from the U.S. Olympic Team Trials in Fort Benning, Georgia, with a final score of 1,855.5. Mowrer scored a total of 558 points in the qualifying rounds by a single inner ten behind Thailand's Jakkrit Panichpatikum, finishing only in fifteenth place.

He represented the United States at the 2020 Summer Olympics where he finished in 13th place for 10m Air Pistol, as well as helping to earn 16th in the mixed team Air Pistol event.

He is currently a staff sergeant in the United States Army Reserves.
