= Grayson Davey =

American sport shooter

Personal information
- Full name: Grayson Trent Davey
- Born: May 28, 2001 (age 25) Anchorage, United States
- Height: 1.90 m (6 ft 3 in)
- Weight: 75 kg (165 lb)

Sport
- Country: United States
- Sport: Shooting
- Event: Trap
Medal record
World Championships
Silver medal – second place	2018 Changwon	Trap team

Grayson Trent Davey (born May 28, 2001) is an American sport shooter.

He participated at the 2018 ISSF World Shooting Championships.
