= Timothy Sherry =

American sport shooter (born 1994)

Personal information
- Nationality: American
- Born: July 8, 1994 (age 32)
- Height: 5 ft 10 in (178 cm)

Sport
- Country: United States
- Sport: Shooting
Medal record
Men's shooting
Representing United States
Pan American Games
Gold medal – first place	2019 Lima	50 m rifle 3 positions
Silver medal – second place	2023 Santiago	50 m rifle 3 positions
World Championships
Bronze medal – third place	2023 Baku	300 m rifle prone
Bronze medal – third place	2023 Baku	300 m standard rifle open

Timothy Sherry (born July 8, 1994) is an American sport shooter. He won the gold medal in the men's 50 metres rifle three positions event at the 2019 Pan American Games held in Lima, Peru.
