= Ashley Carroll =

American sport shooter

Personal information
- Born: November 24, 1994 (age 31) Santa Barbara, United States
- Height: 1.68 m (5 ft 6 in)

Sport
- Country: United States
- Sport: Shooting
- Event: Trap
Medal record
Women's shooting
Representing United States
World Championships
Gold medal – first place	2017 Moscow	Trap team
Gold medal – first place	2019 Lonato del Garda	Trap
Gold medal – first place	2019 Lonato del Garda	Trap team
Bronze medal – third place	2017 Moscow	Mixed trap team
Bronze medal – third place	2018 Changwon	Trap team
Pan American Games
Gold medal – first place	2019 Lima	Trap
Gold medal – first place	2019 Lima	Mixed trap
Championships of the Americas
Gold medal – first place	2014 Guadalajara	Trap
Gold medal – first place	2018 Guadalajara	Trap team
Gold medal – first place	2018 Guadalajara	Mixed trap team
Bronze medal – third place	2018 Guadalajara	Trap

Ashley Carroll (born November 24, 1994) is an American sport shooter. She grew up in Solvang, California and has competed in the World Championships, Pan American Games, and Championships of the Americas.

She participated at the 2018 ISSF World Shooting Championships, winning a medal.

She is the first USA Shooting Team athlete to win three straight national titles since Vincent Hancock from 2010-2012.

== Beginnings ==
Ashley Carroll got introduced to trap shooting by her father, Charlie, a longtime shooting sport coach. She later joined the Scholastic Clay Target Program (SCTP), where she began to practice regularly.

As a teenager, Ashley regularly competed with adults. She also participated in multiple national competitions, including the Junior Olympics. In 2010, she committed to shooting full time after traveling overseas with the World Cup team. By 2013, she began training at the U.S Olympic Training Center in Colorado.
