= Adriana Ruano =

Guatemalan sports shooter

Adriana Ruano Oliva
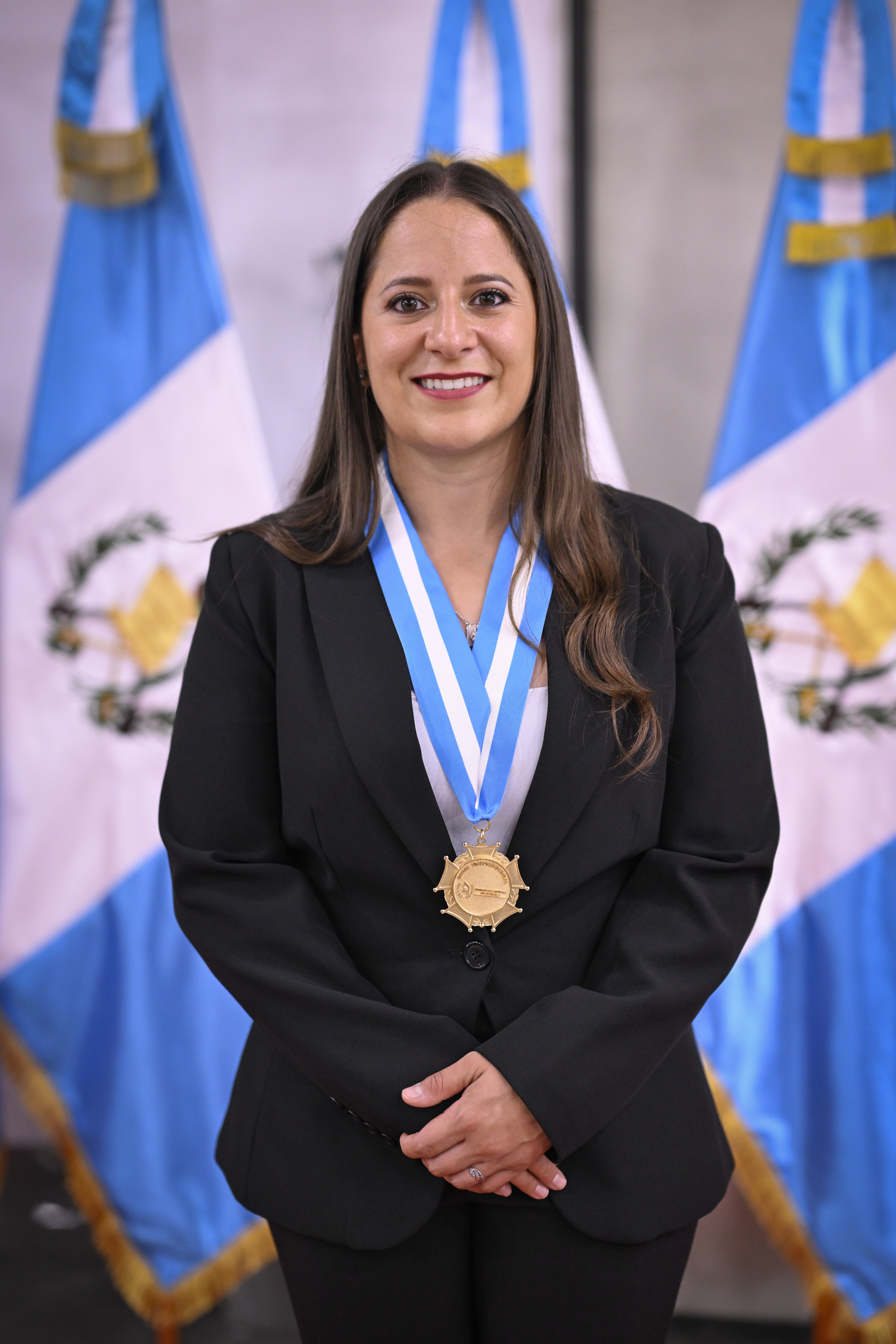
- Ruano in 2025

Personal information
- Born: 26 June 1995 (age 31) Guatemala City, Guatemala

Sport
- Sport: Shooting
- Coached by: Pedro Martin Fariza
Medal record
Women's shooting
Representing Guatemala and Independent Athletes Team
Olympic Games
Gold medal – first place	2024 Paris	Trap
World Championships
Silver medal – second place	2026 Doha	Trap
Pan American Games
Gold medal – first place	2023 Santiago	Trap

Adriana Ruano Oliva (born 26 June 1995) is a Guatemalan sports shooter and Olympic champion. She competed in the women's trap event at the 2020 Summer Olympics. She won the gold medal and set a new Olympic record in the women's trap event at the 2024 Summer Olympics, the first ever gold medal for Guatemala at the Olympics.

== Career ==
Ruano originally trained as a gymnast, representing Guatemala at the 2010 Pan American Championships and the 2010 Central American and Caribbean Games. While training for the 2011 World Gymnastics Championships, which was a qualifier for the 2012 Summer Olympics, Ruano felt pain in her back, which later proved to be six damaged vertebrae. Her doctor recommended that she take up shooting if she wanted to continue a career in sports.

In 2023, she won gold in the Pan American Games Women's trap competition in Santiago, Chile. She represented the Independent Athletes Team at the games as, at the time, Guatemala's Olympic Committee was suspended by the International Olympic Committee.

Ruano's 2024 Olympic Games win earned praise from the president of Guatemala, Bernardo Arévalo who wrote, "The Olympic history of Guatemala is written in golden letters thanks to Adriana Ruano".
