= Bryant Wallizer =

American rifle shooter (born 1987)

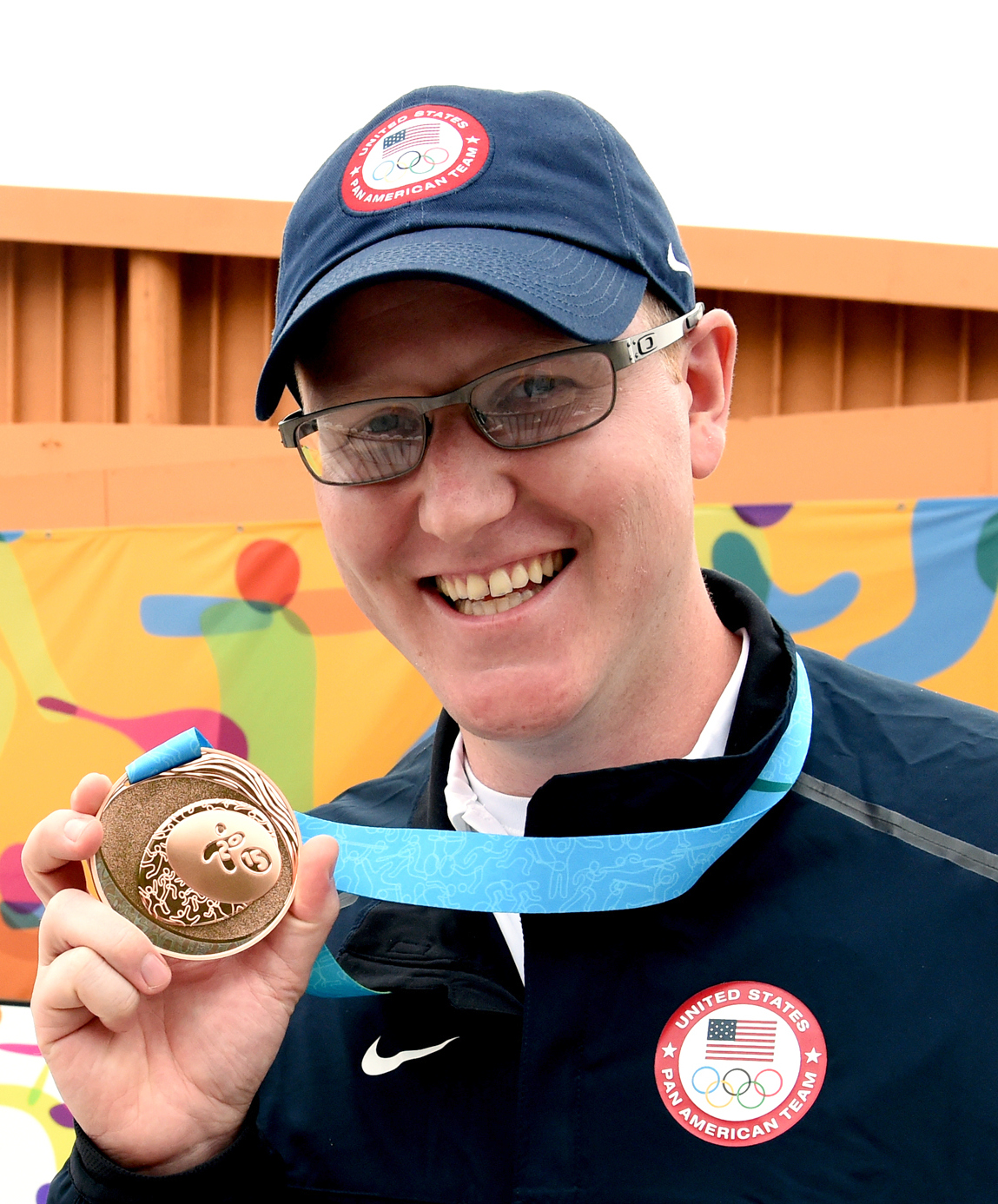
- Wallizer at the 2015 Pan American Games

Personal information
- Born: 6 April 1987 (age 39) Little Orleans, Maryland, U.S.
- Height: 6 ft 1 in (185 cm)
- Weight: 190 lb (86 kg)

Sport
- Sport: Shooting
- Event: 10 m air rifle
- Club: U.S. Army Reserve
- Coached by: Tom Tamas (personal); Dave Johnson (national)
Medal record
Representing the United States
Pan American Games
Bronze medal – third place	2015 Toronto	10 m air rifle

Bryant Wallizer (born 6 April 1987) is an American rifle shooter. He won a bronze medal in the 10 m air rifle at the 2015 Pan American Games.

Wallizer was born to Pat and Donna Wallizer and has one sister; he is married to Morgan Wallizer. He has a degree in environmental protection from the West Virginia University.
