= Alison Weisz =

American rifle shooter

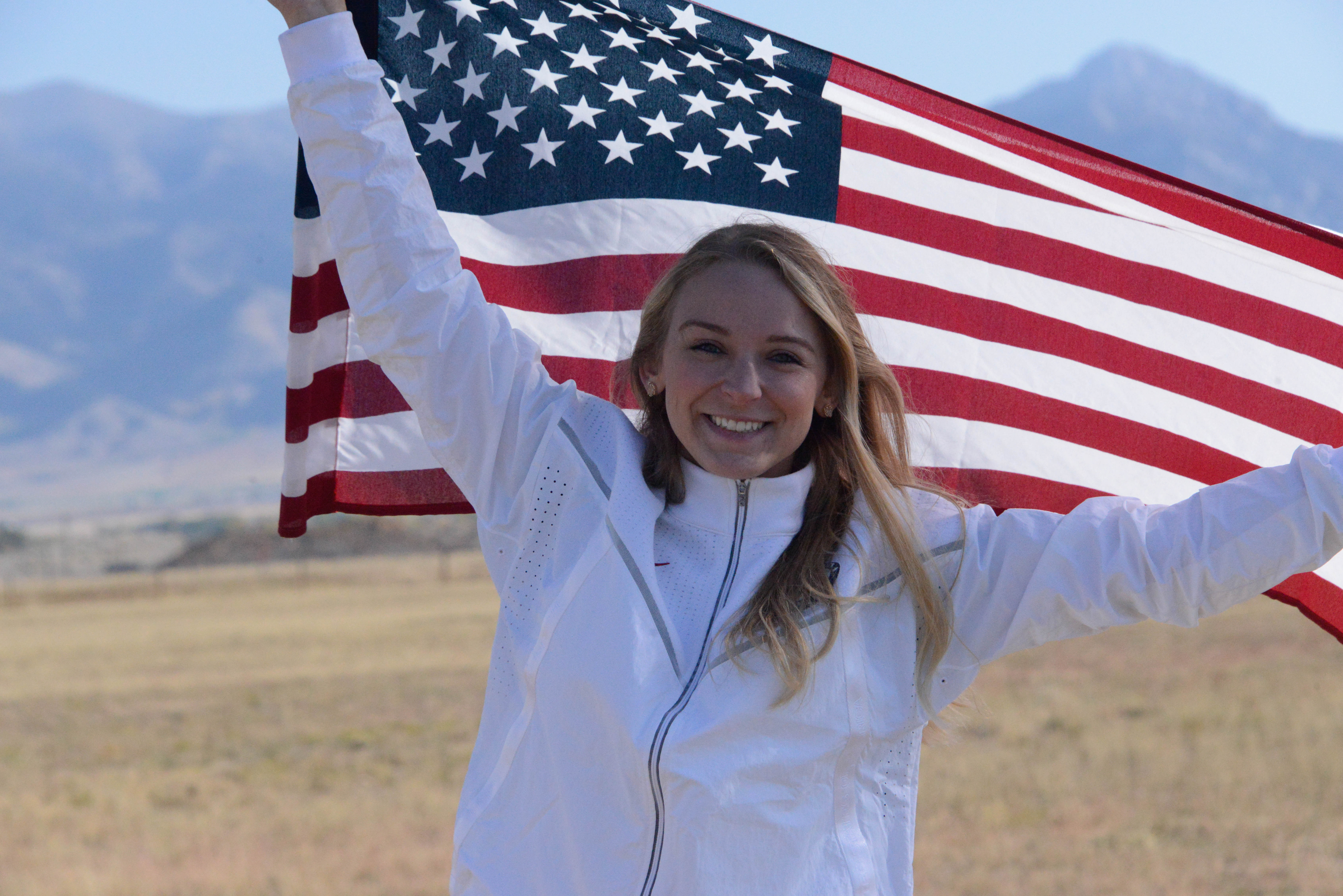

Personal information
- Born: 22 May 1995 (age 31) Rapid City, South Dakota, United States

Sport
- Sport: Sport shooting
Medal record
Representing United States
Pan American Games
Gold medal – first place	2019 Lima	10m air rifle

Alison Marie Weisz (born May 22, 1995) is an American rifle shooter. In 2020, she qualified to represent the United States at the 2020 Summer Olympics in Tokyo.

== Early life and education ==
Weisz was born in Rapid City, South Dakota and grew-up in Belgrade, Montana. Weisz first learned to shoot a gun at age 9 when her family enrolled her in a firearm safety class. She graduated from Belgrade High School in 2013. She attended University of Mississippi and was a member of the school's rifle team.

== Career ==
A month after graduating for the University of Mississippi, Weisz joined the United States national shooting team and won her first competition. In 2018, Weisz came in second at the Championship of the Americas. The following year she won a gold medal at the 2019 Pan American Games in Lima. In 2020, she qualified for the United States Olympic team for the 2020 Summer Olympics in Tokyo.

She is a specialist in the United States Army and serves in the Army Marksmanship Unit at Fort Benning, Georgia.
