= Nicolás Pacheco =

Peruvian sport shooter (born 1994)

Nicolas Pacheco
Personal information
- Full name: Nicolás Pacheco Espinosa
- Nationality: Peruvian
- Born: 23 August 1994 (age 31)

Sport
- Country: Peru
- Sport: Shooting
- Events: Double trap; Trap; Skeet; Sporting clays
Medal record
Men's shooting
Representing Peru
Event	1st	2nd	3rd
Junior World Shotgun Championships	1	1	0
World Cup	1	0	1
Pan American Games	0	0	2
Championships of the Americas	0	0	3
South American Games	4	0	0
Bolivarian Games	5	5	2
Total	11	6	8
World Cup
Gold medal – first place	2022 Lima	Skeet
Bronze medal – third place	2022 Lima	Skeet team
Pan American Games
Bronze medal – third place	2019 Lima	Skeet
Bronze medal – third place	2023 Santiago	Skeet
Championships of the Americas
Bronze medal – third place	2022 Lima	Skeet
Bronze medal – third place	2022 Lima	Skeet mixed team
Bronze medal – third place	2024 Santo Domingo	Skeet mixed team
South American Games
Gold medal – first place	2014 Santiago	Skeet
Gold medal – first place	2018 Cochabamba	Skeet
Gold medal – first place	2022 Asunción	Skeet
Gold medal – first place	2022 Asunción	Skeet mixed team
Bolivarian Games
Gold medal – first place	2013 Trujillo	Skeet
Gold medal – first place	2013 Trujillo	Trap team
Gold medal – first place	2013 Trujillo	75 Sporting clays team
Gold medal – first place	2017 Santa Marta	Double trap team
Gold medal – first place	2025 Lima-Ayacucho	Skeet
Silver medal – second place	2013 Trujillo	75 Sporting clays
Silver medal – second place	2017 Santa Marta	Double trap
Silver medal – second place	2017 Santa Marta	Skeet team
Silver medal – second place	2025 Lima-Ayacucho	Skeet team
Silver medal – second place	2025 Lima-Ayacucho	Skeet mixed team
Bronze medal – third place	2013 Trujillo	Skeet team
Bronze medal – third place	2017 Santa Marta	Skeet
Junior World Shotgun Championships
Gold medal – first place	2013 Lima	Trap
Silver medal – second place	2013 Lima	Skeet

Nicolás Pacheco Espinosa (born 23 August 1994) is a Peruvian sport shooter. At the 2012 Summer Olympics he competed in the Men's skeet, finishing in 32nd place. He studied at Newton College.
