= Gabriela Rodríguez (sport shooter) =

Mexican sport shooter

Personal information
- Full name: Gabriela Guadalupe Rodríguez Garza
- Born: 12 December 1996 (age 29) Monterrey, Mexico

Sport
- Sport: Shooting
Medal record
Women's shooting
Representing Mexico
Pan American Games
Silver medal – second place	2023 Santiago	Skeet

Gabriela Guadalupe Rodríguez Garza (Note: In this Spanish name, the first or paternal surname is Rodríguez and the second or maternal family name is Garza.) (born 12 December 1996) is a Mexican sport shooter. She qualified to represent Mexico at the 2020 Summer Olympics in Tokyo 2021, competing in women's skeet.

Her father, Javier, competed in shooting at the 2012 Summer Olympics.
