= Georgia Furquim =

Brazilian sports shooter (born 1989)

Personal information
- Full name: Georgia Furquim Bastos
- Nationality: Brazilian
- Born: 20 December 1996 (age 29) Porto Alegre, Rio Grande do Sul

Sport
- Country: Brazil
- Sport: Shooting
- Event: Skeet
- Club: Caxangá Golf Club

Georgia Furquim (born 20 December 1996) is a Brazilian sports shooter.

== Career ==
A skeet shooter, Furquim represented Brazil at the 2023 Pan American Games. On 7 March 2024, she secured a place at the Summer Olympics through the XIV Americas Shooting Championship, held in Santo Domingo.

== Personal life ==
Furquim has a degree in architecture and urbanism at UFRGS.
