= Alejandra Ramírez =

Mexican sports shooter

Personal information
- Full name: Alejandra Ramírez Caballero
- Born: 2 March 1997 (age 29) Guadalajara, Mexico

Sport
- Sport: Sports shooting
Medal record
Representing Mexico
Pan American Games
Bronze medal – third place	2019 Lima	Trap

Alejandra Ramírez Caballero (Note: In this Spanish name, the first or paternal surname is Ramírez and the second or maternal family name is Caballero.) (born 2 March 1997) is a Mexican sports shooter. She competed in the women's trap event at the 2020 Summer Olympics. She won the bronze medal at 2019 Pan Am Games and became the first ever Mexican female trap shooter who earned a spot at the Olympics. She also won the gold medal at the 2018 Central American and Caribbean Games.
