= Dania Vizzi =

American sport shooter

Personal information
- Born: March 24, 1995 (age 31) Odessa, Florida, US
- Education: University of Florida

Sport
- Country: United States
- Sport: Shooting
Medal record
Women's shooting
Representing United States
Pan American Games
Gold medal – first place	2023 Santiago	Mixed pairs skeet
Bronze medal – third place	2019 Lima	Skeet

Dania Vizzi (born 24 March 1995) is an American sport shooter. She won the gold medal in the 2023 Pan American Games in the Mixed pairs skeet event.
