= Lucas Kozeniesky =

American sports shooter (born 1995)

Personal information
- Nationality: American
- Born: May 31, 1995 (age 31) Metairie, Louisiana, U.S.
- Height: 5 ft 11 in (180 cm)
- Weight: 180 lb (82 kg)

Sport
- Country: United States
- Sport: Shooting
- Event: Rifle
- Club: North Carolina State University
Medal record
Men's shooting
Representing the United States
Summer Olympics
Silver medal – second place	2020 Tokyo	Mixed 10 m air rifle team
World Championships
Silver medal – second place	2018 Changwon	50 m team rifle prone
Pan American Games
Gold medal – first place	2019 Lima	10 m air rifle
Silver medal – second place	2019 Lima	Mixed 10 m air rifle
Bronze medal – third place	2023 Santiago	50 m rifle three positions

Lucas Kozeniesky (born May 31, 1995) is an American sports shooter. He competed in the men's 10 metre air rifle event at the 2016 Summer Olympics. In June 2021, he qualified to represent the United States at the 2020 Summer Olympics and won a silver medal in the Mixed 10m Air Rifle.
