= Shooting at the 2019 Pan American Games =

- Shooting pictogram
- Venue: Las Palmas Air Base
- Dates: August 8–10, 2019
- Competitors: 132

Shooting competitions at the 2019 Pan American Games in Lima, Peru are scheduled to be held between August 8 and 10, 2019 at the Las Palmas Air Base.

15 medal events are scheduled to be contested. Six for men, six for women and three mixed gender events. The men's 50 m pistol, men's 50 m rifle and men's double trap events have been dropped in favour of three mixed gender events. This was done after the International Olympic Committee pushed for gender equal events across all sports. A total of 256 sport shooters will qualify to compete at the games.

The top two shooters, not already qualified, in each individual event will qualify for the 2020 Summer Olympics in Tokyo, Japan.

== Medal table ==
* Host nation (Peru)

Rank	Nation	Gold	Silver	Bronze	Total
1	United States	10	8	2	20
2	Cuba	4	2	1	7
3	Argentina	1	0	2	3
4	Ecuador	0	2	2	4
5	Mexico	0	1	3	4
6	Chile	0	1	0	1
6	Guatemala	0	1	0	1
8	Brazil	0	0	2	2
8	Peru*	0	0	2	2
10	Canada	0	0	1	1
Totals (10 entries)		15	15	15	45

== Medalists ==
=== Men's events ===
Event	Gold	Silver	Bronze
10 metre air rifle	Lucas Kozeniesky; United States	Edson Ramírez; Mexico	Marcelo Gutiérrez; Argentina
50 metre rifle three positions	Timothy Sherry; United States	Michael McPhail; United States	José Luis Sánchez; Mexico
10 metre air pistol	Jorge Grau; Cuba	Nick Mowrer; United States	Júlio Almeida; Brazil
25 metre rapid fire pistol	Jorge Álvarez; Cuba	Leuris Pupo; Cuba	Marko Carrillo; Peru
Trap	Brian Burrows; United States	Derek Haldeman; United States	Roberto Schmits; Brazil
Skeet	Christian Elliott; United States	Juan Schaeffer; Guatemala	Nicolás Pacheco; Peru

=== Women's events ===
Event	Gold	Silver	Bronze
10 metre air rifle	Alison Weisz; United States	Minden Miles; United States	Fernanda Russo; Argentina
50 metre rifle three positions	Sarah Beard; United States	Eglis Yaima Cruz; Cuba	Virginia Thrasher; United States
10 metre air pistol	Laina Pérez; Cuba	Andrea Pérez Peña; Ecuador	Sheyla González; Cuba
25 metre pistol	Sandra Uptagrafft; United States	Diana Durango; Ecuador	Andrea Pérez Peña; Ecuador
Trap	Ashley Carroll; United States	Rachel Tozier; United States	Alejandra Ramírez; Mexico
Skeet	Kim Rhode; United States	Francisca Crovetto; Chile	Dania Vizzi; United States

=== Mixed pairs events ===
Event	Gold	Silver	Bronze
10 metre air pistol	Cuba; Laina Pérez; Jorge Grau	United States; Miglena Todorova; Nick Mowrer	Ecuador; Andrea Pérez Peña; Yautung Cueva
10 metre air rifle	Argentina; Fernanda Russo; Marcelo Gutiérrez	United States; Minden Miles; Lucas Kozeniesky	Mexico; Gabriela Martínez; Edson Ramírez
Trap	United States; Ashley Carroll; Derek Haldeman	United States; Rachel Tozier; Brian Burrows	Canada; Amanda Chudoba; Curtis Wennberg

== Qualification ==
A total of 256 sport shooters will qualify to compete. Each nation may enter a maximum of 24 athletes (two per each individual event). There will be three qualification events for shooters to qualify. There will be no quotas awarded for the mixed events, as nations must use already qualified athletes to compete in them. As host nation, Peru will get a quota of six athletes (two per each discipline, and can qualify more) and there will also be two wild cards awarded to nations not qualified.

== See also ==
- Shooting at the 2019 Parapan American Games
- Shooting at the 2020 Summer Olympics
