= Patrick Sunderman =

American sport shooter

Personal information
- Nationality: American
- Born: 17 August 1994 (age 31) Farmington, Minnesota, US

Sport
- Sport: Shooting

Patrick Sunderman is an American sport shooter. He represents USA at the 2020 Summer Olympics in Tokyo.

He is a sergeant in the United States Army and serves as a shooter/instructor with the international team of the Army Marksmanship Unit.
