= Francisca Crovetto =

Chilean sport shooter (born 1990)

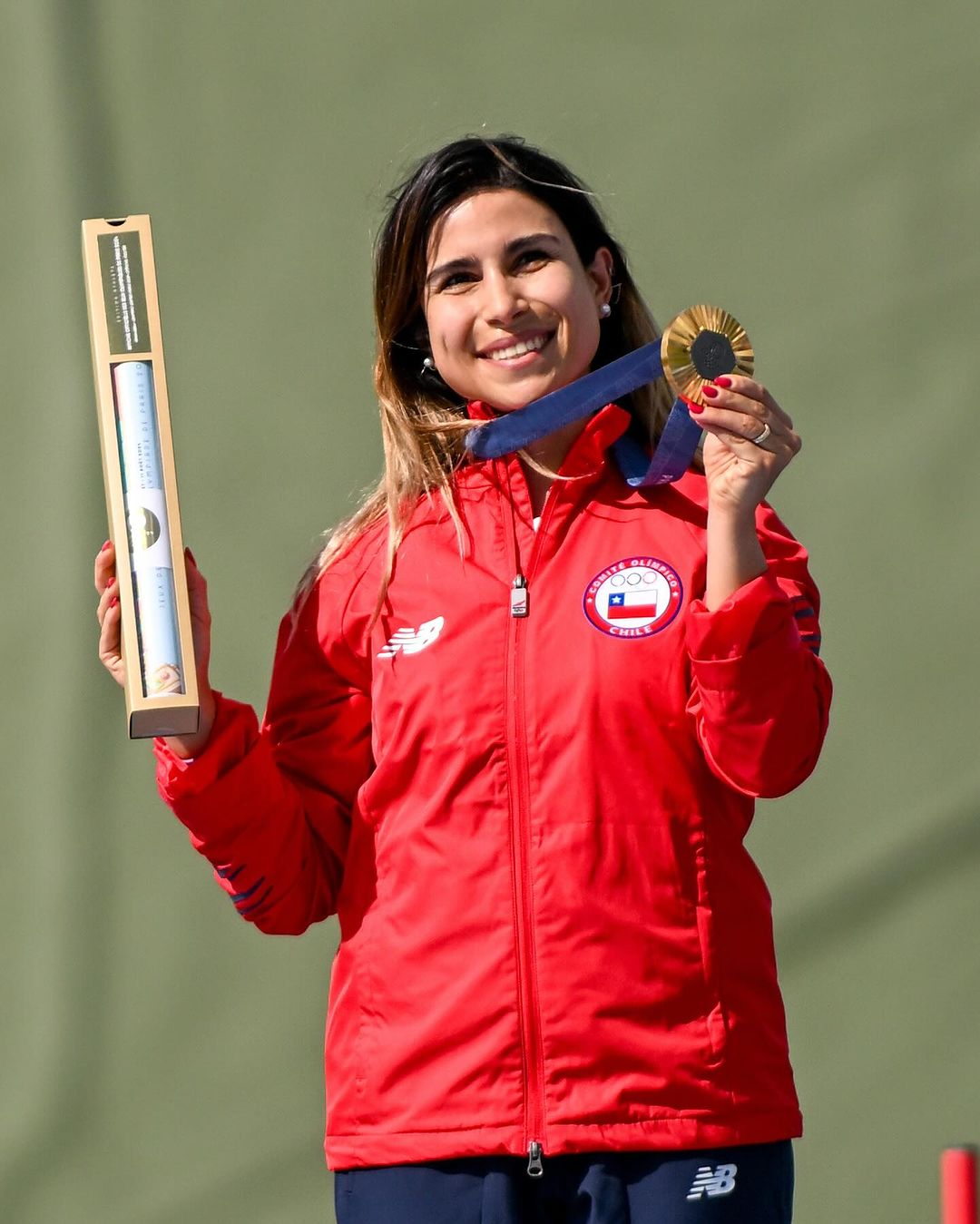
- Crovetto at the 2024 Summer Olympics

Personal information
- Full name: Francisca Crovetto Chadid
- Nationality: Chile
- Born: 27 April 1990 (age 36) Santiago, Chile
- Height: 1.60 m (5 ft 3 in)
- Weight: 54 kg (119 lb)

Sport
- Sport: Shooting
- Event: Skeet
- Coached by: Angel Marentis
Medal record
Women's shooting
Representing Chile
Olympic Games
Gold medal – first place	2024 Paris	Skeet
Pan American Games
Gold medal – first place	2023 Santiago	Skeet
Silver medal – second place	2011 Guadalajara	Skeet
Silver medal – second place	2019 Lima	Skeet
Bronze medal – third place	2015 Toronto	Skeet
South American Games
Gold medal – first place	2010 Medellín	Skeet
Silver medal – second place	2014 Santiago	Skeet
Silver medal – second place	2022 Asunción	Skeet
Silver medal – second place	2026 Santa Fe	Skeet
Bronze medal – third place	2018 Cochabamba	Skeet
Bolivarian Games
Gold medal – first place	2013 Trujillo	Skeet
Gold medal – first place	2017 Santa Marta	Skeet

Francisca Crovetto Chadid (born April 27, 1990, in Santiago) is a Chilean sport shooter. She won the gold medal at the 2024 Summer Olympics in the women's skeet event, marking the third gold medal in Chilean Olympic history and becoming the first Chilean woman to win gold.

Crovetto represented Chile at the 2012 Summer Olympics in London, competing as the nation's sole shooter in the women's skeet. She placed eighth in the qualifying rounds, narrowly missing the finals by one point behind Sweden's Therese Lundqvist, with a total score of 66 targets. At the 2016 Summer Olympics, Crovetto was again Chile's lone representative in sport shooting, finishing 19th. She also represented Chile at the 2020 Summer Olympics. At the 2024 Summer Olympics, Crovetto won gold in women's skeet, defeating Britain's Amber Rutter in a controversial tiebreaker. They were tied 55–55 after 60 shots, but Crovetto prevailed 7–6 in the tiebreaker to win Chile's first Olympic medal since 2008.

At the Pan American Games, Crovetto boasts a gold medal from the 2023 Santiago edition, silver medals from the 2011 Guadalajara and 2019 Lima editions, and a bronze from 2015 Toronto edition.

Olympic Games
Preceded by Henrik von Appen	Flag bearer for Chile; Tokyo 2020 with Marco Grimalt	Succeeded by Dominique Ohaco; Henrik Von Appen
