= Alessandro de Souza Ferreira =

Peruvian sports shooter (born 1992)

Alessandro de Souza
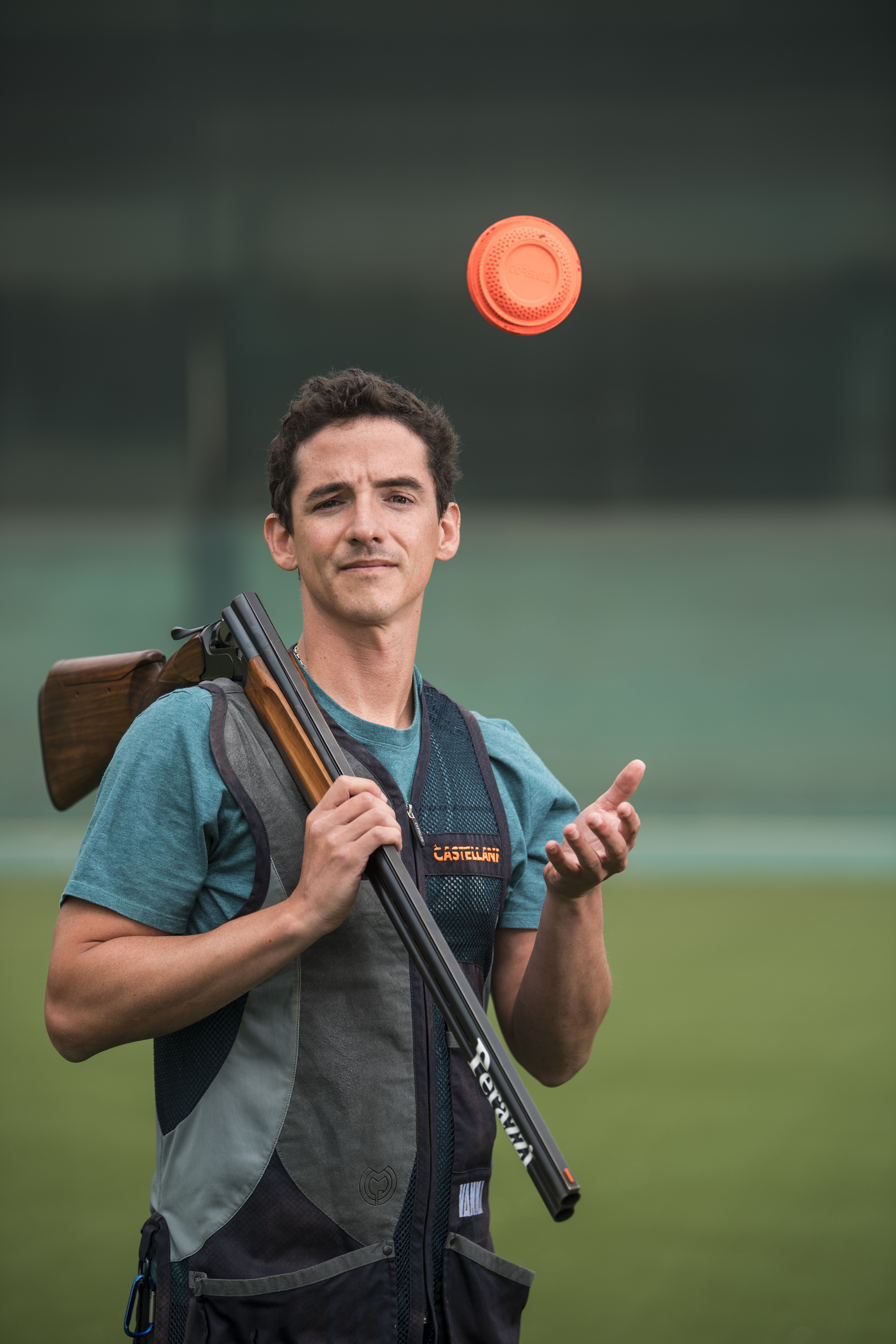

Personal information
- Full name: Alessandro Alberto de Souza Ferreira Berisso
- Born: 23 March 1992 (age 33) Lima, Peru

Sport
- Sport: Sports shooting

Alessandro Alberto de Souza Ferreira Berisso (born 23 March 1992) is a Peruvian sports shooter. He competed in the men's trap event at the 2020 Summer Olympics.
