= Marko Carrillo =

Peruvian sports shooter (born 1988)

Personal information
- Born: 4 July 1988 (age 37) Lima, Peru

Sport
- Sport: Sports shooting
Medal record
Men's shooting
Representing Peru
Pan American Games
Bronze medal – third place	2015 Toronto	25 m rapid fire pistol
Bronze medal – third place	2019 Lima	25 m rapid fire pistol

Marko Antonio Carrillo Zevallos (born 4 July 1988) is a Peruvian sports shooter. He competed in the men's 10 metre air pistol event at the 2016 Summer Olympics.
