= Alexis Eberhardt =

Argentine sports shooter

Personal information
- Born: 2 March 1999 (age 26) Santa Fe, Argentina

Sport
- Sport: Sports shooting

Alexis Exequiel Eberhardt (born 2 March 1999) is an Argentine sports shooter . He competed in the men's 10 metre air rifle event at the 2020 Summer Olympics.
