= Bolivia at the 2027 Pan American Games =

- IOC code: BOL
- NOC: Bolivian Olympic Committee

in Lima, Peru 2027 – 2027
- Competitors: 3 in 3 sports
- Medals: Gold 0 Silver 0 Bronze 0 Total 0

Pan American Games appearances (overview)
- 1967; 1971; 1975; 1979; 1983; 1987; 1991; 1995; 1999; 2003; 2007; 2011; 2015; 2019; 2023

Bolivia is scheduled to compete at the 2027 Pan American Games in Lima, Peru from July 23 to August 8, 2027. This will be Bolivia's 16th appearance at the Pan American Games, having competed at every edition of the games since 1967.

== Competitors ==
The following is the list of number of competitors (per gender) participating at the games per sport/discipline.

Sport	Men	Women	Total
Equestrian			1
Fencing	1	0	1
Gymnastics	1	0	1
Total	2	0	3

== Equestrian ==
Bolivia qualified one individual equestrian in Jumping after earning bronze medal at the 2026 South American Games.

=== Jumping ===
Athlete	Horse	Event	Qualification											Final							
Athlete	Horse	Event	Round 1			Round 2.1			Round 2.2			Total		Round A			Round B			Total	
Athlete	Horse	Event	Faults	Result Time	Rank	Faults	Result Time	Rank	Faults	Result Time	Rank	Faults	Rank	Faults	Result Time	Rank	Faults	Result Time	Rank	Faults	Rank
		Individual																			

== Fencing ==
Bolivia qualified one male fencer at the 2025 Junior Pan American Games.

Men

Athlete	Event	Pool Round		Round of 16	Quarterfinals	Semifinals	Final	
Athlete	Event	Victories	Seed	Opposition Score	Opposition Score	Opposition Score	Opposition Score	Rank
Esteban Shepard	Individual sabre							

== Gymnastics ==
=== Artistic ===
Bolivia qualified a male gymnast in artistic at the 2026 Pan American Artistic Gymnastics Championships.

Men

Athlete	Event	Qualification						Total	Rank
Athlete	Event	F	PH	R	V	PB	HB	Total	Rank
	Individual all-around								

Qualification Legend: Q = Qualified to apparatus final
