= Racquetball at the Pan American Games =

- No. of events: 7 (men: 3; women: 3; mixed: 1)

Racquetball has been part of the Pan American Games since 1995 Games in Mar del Plata, Argentina, although it was not included in the 2007 Games due host country cultural reasons. Racquetball was again included in the 2011 Pan American Games in Guadalajara, Mexico, 2015 Pan American Games in Toronto, Ontario, 2019 Pan American Games in Lima, Peru, and the 2023 Pan American Games in Santiago, Chile.

The United States dominated the racquetball events in the first three games, but Mexico has been the dominant country in the last four games, winning 11 of 12 gold medals in the women's events and 6 of the 12 gold medals in the men's events.

In 2023, for the first time four countries split the gold from the 7 events (men's & women's singles & doubles, mixed doubles & men's & women's team events), and that's the most countries to win a gold in racquetball at a single Pan Am Games.

The Pan American Sports announced that racquetball will be included in the 2027 Pan American Games program in Lima, Peru on August 7, 2025.

== Medal table ==
Rank	Nation	Gold	Silver	Bronze	Total
1	Mexico	19	4	15	38
2	United States	16	12	12	40
3	Bolivia	3	3	9	15
4	Independent Athletes Team	1	0	2	3
5	Canada	0	10	10	20
6	Argentina	0	7	4	11
7	Colombia	0	1	3	4
8	Venezuela	0	1	2	3
9	Guatemala	0	1	0	1
10	Ecuador	0	0	6	6
11	Chile	0	0	3	3
11	Costa Rica	0	0	3	3
13	Puerto Rico	0	0	1	1
Totals (13 entries)		39	39	70	148

== Men ==
=== Singles ===
Games	Gold	Silver	Bronze
1995 Mar del Plata	John Ellis; United States	Michael Bronfeld; United States	Sherman Greenfeld; Canada
1999 Winnipeg	Adam Karp; United States	Michael Bronfeld; United States	Rob de Jesús; Puerto Rico
2003 Santo Domingo	Jack Huczek; United States	Mike Green; Canada	Rocky Carson; United States
2003 Santo Domingo	Jack Huczek; United States	Mike Green; Canada	Gilberto Mejia; Mexico
2011 Guadalajara	Rocky Carson; United States	Gilberto Mejia; Mexico	Álvaro Beltrán; Mexico
2011 Guadalajara	Rocky Carson; United States	Gilberto Mejia; Mexico	Vincent Gagnon; Canada
2015 Toronto	Rocky Carson; United States	Álvaro Beltrán; Mexico	Conrrado Moscoso; Bolivia
2015 Toronto	Rocky Carson; United States	Álvaro Beltrán; Mexico	Daniel de la Rosa; Mexico
2019 Lima	Rodrigo Montoya; Mexico	Álvaro Beltrán; Mexico	Conrrado Moscoso; Bolivia
2019 Lima	Rodrigo Montoya; Mexico	Álvaro Beltrán; Mexico	Mario Mercado; Colombia
2023 Santiago	Conrrado Moscoso; Bolivia	Carlos Keller; Bolivia	Eduardo Portillo; Mexico
2023 Santiago	Conrrado Moscoso; Bolivia	Carlos Keller; Bolivia	Rodrigo Montoya; Mexico

=== Doubles ===
Games	Gold	Silver	Bronze
1995 Mar del Plata	Sudsy Monchik and Tim Sweeney; United States	Chris Brumwell and Jacques Demers; Canada	Fabian Balmori and Jorge Hirsekorn; Venezuela
1999 Winnipeg	Douglas Ganim and Drew Kachtik; United States	Roger Harripersad and Kelly Kerr; Canada	Álvaro Beltrán and Javier Moreno; Mexico
2003 Santo Domingo	Álvaro Beltrán and Javier Moreno; Mexico	Rubén González and Mike Guidry; United States	Daniel Maggi and Shai Manzuri; Argentina
2003 Santo Domingo	Álvaro Beltrán and Javier Moreno; Mexico	Rubén González and Mike Guidry; United States	Corey Osborne and François Viens; Canada
2011 Guadalajara	Álvaro Beltrán and Javier Moreno; Mexico	César Castillo and Jorge Hirsekorn; Venezuela	Timothy Landeryou and Kristofer Odegard; Canada
2011 Guadalajara	Álvaro Beltrán and Javier Moreno; Mexico	César Castillo and Jorge Hirsekorn; Venezuela	Christopher Crowther and Shane Vanderson; United States
2015 Toronto	Jose Rojas and Jansen Allen; United States	Conrrado Moscoso and Roland Keller; Bolivia	Timothy Landeryou and Vincent Gagnon; Canada
2015 Toronto	Jose Rojas and Jansen Allen; United States	Conrrado Moscoso and Roland Keller; Bolivia	Álvaro Beltrán and Javier Moreno; Mexico
2019 Lima	Javier Mar and Rodrigo Montoya; Mexico	Conrrado Moscoso and Roland Keller; Bolivia	Rocky Carson and Charles Pratt; United States
2019 Lima	Javier Mar and Rodrigo Montoya; Mexico	Conrrado Moscoso and Roland Keller; Bolivia	Andrés Acuña and Felipe Camacho; Costa Rica
2023 Santiago	Javier Mar and Rodrigo Montoya; Mexico	Coby Iwaasa and Samuel Murray; Canada	Andrés Acuña and Gabriel Garcia; Costa Rica
2023 Santiago	Javier Mar and Rodrigo Montoya; Mexico	Coby Iwaasa and Samuel Murray; Canada	Edwin Galicia and Juan Salvatierra; Independent Athletes Team

=== Team ===
Games	Gold	Silver	Bronze
1995 Mar del Plata	United States	Canada	Venezuela
2011 Guadalajara	Mexico; Álvaro Beltrán; Gilberto Mejia; Javier Moreno	United States; Rocky Carson; Christopher Crowther; Shane Vanderson	Colombia; Francisco Gómez; Alejandro Herrera; Juan Herrera; Juan Torres
2011 Guadalajara	Mexico; Álvaro Beltrán; Gilberto Mejia; Javier Moreno	United States; Rocky Carson; Christopher Crowther; Shane Vanderson	Ecuador; José Álvarez; Fernando Ríos; José Ugalde
2015 Toronto	Mexico; Álvaro Beltrán; Daniel de la Rosa; Javier Moreno	United States; Rocky Carson; Jansen Allen; Jose Rojas; Jake Bredenbeck	Bolivia; Carlos Keller; Roland Keller; Conrrado Moscoso
2015 Toronto	Mexico; Álvaro Beltrán; Daniel de la Rosa; Javier Moreno	United States; Rocky Carson; Jansen Allen; Jose Rojas; Jake Bredenbeck	Canada; Vincent Gagnon; Mike Green; Coby Iwaasa; Tim Landeryou
2019 Lima	Bolivia; Carlos Keller; Roland Keller; Conrrado Moscoso	Colombia; Sebastian Franco; Mario Mercado	United States; Rocky Carson; Charles Pratt; Jake Bredenbeck
2019 Lima	Bolivia; Carlos Keller; Roland Keller; Conrrado Moscoso	Colombia; Sebastian Franco; Mario Mercado	Mexico; Álvaro Beltrán; Javier Mar; Rodrigo Montoya
2023 Santiago	Bolivia; Carlos Keller; Kadim Carrasco; Conrrado Moscoso	Canada; Coby Iwaasa; Samuel Murray	United States; Daniel De La Rosa; Alejandro Landa; Adam Manilla
2023 Santiago	Bolivia; Carlos Keller; Kadim Carrasco; Conrrado Moscoso	Canada; Coby Iwaasa; Samuel Murray	Mexico; Eduardo Portillo; Javier Mar; Rodrigo Montoya

== Women ==
=== Singles ===
Games	Gold	Silver	Bronze
1995 Mar del Plata	Michelle Gould; United States	Cheryl Gudinas; United States	Carol McFetridge; Canada
1999 Winnipeg	Cheryl Gudinas; United States	Christie Van Hees; Canada	Laura Fenton; United States
2003 Santo Domingo	Cheryl Gudinas; United States	Laura Fenton; United States	Angela Grisar; Chile
2003 Santo Domingo	Cheryl Gudinas; United States	Laura Fenton; United States	Lori-Jane Powell; Canada
2011 Guadalajara	Paola Longoria; Mexico	Rhonda Rajsich; United States	Cheryl Gudinas; United States
2011 Guadalajara	Paola Longoria; Mexico	Rhonda Rajsich; United States	María José Vargas; Bolivia
2015 Toronto	Paola Longoria; Mexico	María José Vargas; Argentina	Veronica Sotomayor; Ecuador
2015 Toronto	Paola Longoria; Mexico	María José Vargas; Argentina	Rhonda Rajsich; United States
2019 Lima	Paola Longoria; Mexico	María José Vargas; Argentina	Adriana Riveros; Colombia
2019 Lima	Paola Longoria; Mexico	María José Vargas; Argentina	Natalia Méndez; Argentina
2023 Santiago	Paola Longoria; Mexico	Montserrat Mejia; Mexico	María José Vargas; Argentina
2023 Santiago	Paola Longoria; Mexico	Montserrat Mejia; Mexico	Maricruz Ortiz; Costa Rica

=== Doubles ===
Games	Gold	Silver	Bronze
1995 Mar del Plata	Joy MacKenzie and Jackie Paraiso; United States	Vicky Brown-Shanks and Deborah Ward; Canada	? Mexico
1999 Winnipeg	Joy MacKenzie and Jackie Paraiso; United States	Lori-Jane Powell and Deborah Ward; Canada	Angela Grisar and Loreta Barriga; Chile
2003 Santo Domingo	Susana Acosta and Rosa Torres; Mexico	Jackie Rice and Kim Russell; United States	Paola Núñez and Caroli Santos; Bolivia
2003 Santo Domingo	Susana Acosta and Rosa Torres; Mexico	Jackie Rice and Kim Russell; United States	Josée Grand'Maître and Julie Neubauer; Canada
2011 Guadalajara	Paola Longoria and Samantha Salas; Mexico	Rhonda Rajsich and Aimee Ruiz; United States	Angela Grisar and Carla Muñoz; Chile
2011 Guadalajara	Paola Longoria and Samantha Salas; Mexico	Rhonda Rajsich and Aimee Ruiz; United States	María Córdova and María Muñoz; Ecuador
2015 Toronto	Paola Longoria and Samantha Salas; Mexico	Veronique Guillemette and María José Vargas; Argentina	Veronica Sotomayor and María Muñoz; Ecuador
2015 Toronto	Paola Longoria and Samantha Salas; Mexico	Veronique Guillemette and María José Vargas; Argentina	Rhonda Rajsich and Kim Russell Waselenchuk; United States
2019 Lima	Paola Longoria and Samantha Salas; Mexico	Gabriela Martínez and María Rodriguez; Guatemala	Kelani Lawrence and Rhonda Rajsich; United States
2019 Lima	Paola Longoria and Samantha Salas; Mexico	Gabriela Martínez and María Rodriguez; Guatemala	Natalia Méndez and María José Vargas; Argentina
2023 Santiago	Gabriela Martínez and María Rodriguez; Independent Athletes Team	Natalia Méndez and María José Vargas; Argentina	Alexandra Herrera and Montserrat Mejia; Mexico
2023 Santiago	Gabriela Martínez and María Rodriguez; Independent Athletes Team	Natalia Méndez and María José Vargas; Argentina	Angélica Barrios and Jenny Daza; Bolivia

=== Team ===
Games	Gold	Silver	Bronze
1995 Mar del Plata	United States	Canada	Mexico
2011 Guadalajara	Mexico; Paola Longoria; Samantha Salas	United States; Cheryl Gudinas; Rhonda Rajsich; Aimee Ruiz	Bolivia; Jenny Daza; Cintia Loma; María José Vargas
2011 Guadalajara	Mexico; Paola Longoria; Samantha Salas	United States; Cheryl Gudinas; Rhonda Rajsich; Aimee Ruiz	Ecuador; María Córdova; María Muñoz
2015 Toronto	Mexico; Paola Longoria; Samantha Salas	United States; Michelle Key; Rhonda Rajsich; Kim Russell Waselenchuk	Canada; Jennifer Saunders; Frédérique Lambert
2015 Toronto	Mexico; Paola Longoria; Samantha Salas	United States; Michelle Key; Rhonda Rajsich; Kim Russell Waselenchuk	Ecuador; Veronica Sotomayor; María Muñoz
2019 Lima	Mexico; Paola Longoria; Samantha Salas; Montserrat Mejia	Argentina; Natalia Méndez; María José Vargas	United States; Kelani Lawrence; Rhonda Rajsich
2019 Lima	Mexico; Paola Longoria; Samantha Salas; Montserrat Mejia	Argentina; Natalia Méndez; María José Vargas	Bolivia; Valeria Centellas; Angelica Barrios; Jenny Daza
2023 Santiago	Mexico; Paola Longoria; Alexandra Herrera; Montserrat Mejia	Argentina; Natalia Méndez; María José Vargas	United States; Michelle Key; Erika Manilla
2023 Santiago	Mexico; Paola Longoria; Alexandra Herrera; Montserrat Mejia	Argentina; Natalia Méndez; María José Vargas	Independent Athletes Team; Gabriela Martínez; María Rodriguez

== Mixed ==
=== Doubles ===
Event	Gold	Silver	Bronze
2023 Santiago	United States; Adam Manilla; Erika Manilla	Argentina; Diego García; María José Vargas	Bolivia; Conrrado Moscoso; Angélica Barrios
2023 Santiago	United States; Adam Manilla; Erika Manilla	Argentina; Diego García; María José Vargas	Mexico; Eduardo Portillo; Paola Longoria

== Events ==
Event	1995	1999	2003	2011	2015	2019	2023
Men's singles	•	•	•	•	•	•	•
Men's doubles	•	•	•	•	•	•	•
Men's team	•			•	•	•	•
Women's singles	•	•	•	•	•	•	•
Women's doubles	•	•	•	•	•	•	•
Women's team	•			•	•	•	•
Mixed doubles							•
Events	6	4	4	6	6	6	7
