= Shooting at the 2011 Pan American Games – Men's 50 metre pistol =

Shooting – Men's 50 metre pistol at the 2011 Pan American Games
- Venue: Jalisco Hunting Club
- Dates: October 18
- Competitors: 28 from 19 nations

Medalists
Gold medal	Sergio Sanchez	Guatemala
Silver medal	Daryl Szarenski	United States
Bronze medal	Júlio Almeida	Brazil

The men's 50 metre pistol shooting event at the 2011 Pan American Games was held on October 18 at the Jalisco Hunting Club in Guadalajara. The defending Pan American Games champion was Jason Turner of the United States.

The event consisted of two rounds: a qualifier and a final. In the qualifier, each shooter fired 60 shots with a pistol at 50 metres distance. Scores for each shot were in increments of 1, with a maximum score of 10.

The top 8 shooters in the qualifying round moved on to the final round. There, they fired an additional 10 shots. These shots scored in increments of .1, with a maximum score of 10.9. The total score from all 70 shots was used to determine final ranking.

Sergio Sanchez of Guatemala won the competition, which qualified his country a quota spot for the men's 50 metre pistol event at the 2012 Summer Olympics in London, Great Britain.

== Schedule ==
All times are Central Standard Time (UTC-6).

Date	Time	Round
October 18, 2011	9:00	Qualification
October 18, 2011	13:00	Final

== Records ==
The existing world and Pan American Games records were as follows.

Qualification records
World record	Alexsander Melentiev (URS)	581	Moscow, Soviet Union	July 20, 1980
Pan American record	Jason Turner (USA)	563	Santo Domingo, Dominican Republic	August 5, 2003

Final records
World record	William Demarest (USA)	676.2	Milan, Italy	June 4, 2000
Pan American record	Daryl Szarenski (USA)	658.1	Santo Domingo, Dominican Republic	August 5, 2003

== Results ==
=== Qualification round ===
28 athletes from 19 countries competed.

Rank	Athlete	Country	1	2	3	4	5	6	Total	Notes
1	Sergio Sanchez	Guatemala	92	93	94	91	98	91	559	Q
2	Hugo Hernandez	Mexico	95	93	91	89	89	92	549	Q
3	Daryl Szarenski	United States	90	89	93	93	91	92	548	Q
4	Nickolaus Mowrer	United States	90	94	88	88	90	95	545	Q
5	Stenio Yamamoto	Brazil	92	91	94	91	87	90	545	Q
6	Júlio Almeida	Brazil	89	91	86	91	93	95	545	Q
7	Yulio Zorrilla	Cuba	88	91	93	92	95	86	545	Q
8	Juan Olvera	Mexico	92	83	92	93	94	90	544	Q
9	Maunal Sanchez	Chile	86	87	90	91	94	94	542	
10	Frank Bonilla	Venezuela	89	86	90	86	93	95	539	
11	Roger Daniel	Trinidad and Tobago	87	91	89	91	90	88	536	
12	Mario Vinueza	Ecuador	90	89	93	91	83	90	536	
13	Jorge Grau	Cuba	95	82	88	88	92	90	535	
14	Alex Peralta	Colombia	87	94	88	88	86	91	534	
15	Enrique Arnaez	Peru	92	87	87	88	90	90	534	
16	Maximino Modesti	Argentina	84	91	93	89	85	91	533	
17	Marco Nuñez	Venezuela	87	86	90	86	89	94	532	
18	Sylvain Ouellette	Canada	91	91	89	86	91	83	531	
19	Rudolf Knijnenburg	Bolivia	91	89	87	82	95	86	530	
20	Nestor Godoy	Argentina	88	83	84	91	89	94	529	
21	Martin Galvez	Peru	90	92	83	87	86	89	527	
22	Julio Molina	El Salvador	88	91	86	82	86	90	523	
23	Jaime Davila	Nicaragua	88	86	90	87	87	82	520	
24	Ricardo Chandeck	Panama	91	83	84	90	82	83	513	
25	Manuel Figuereo	Dominican Republic	85	79	85	90	84	89	512	
26	Josue Hernandez	Dominican Republic	83	84	84	81	87	91	510	
27	Calvert Herbert	Barbados	79	88	86	87	86	82	598	
28	Pablo Guerrero	Nicaragua	79	77	81	78	79	83	477	

=== Final ===
Rank	Athlete	Qual	1	2	3	4	5	6	7	8	9	10	Final	Total	Notes
1st place, gold medalist(s)	Sergio Sanchez (GUA)	559	7.5	8.4	9.5	10.5	8.6	9.6	9.2	9.1	8.4	9.1	89.9	648.9	
2nd place, silver medalist(s)	Daryl Szarenski (USA)	548	8.3	9.5	9.2	8.3	10.7	10.0	7.7	10.2	7.8	10.3	92.0	640.0	
3rd place, bronze medalist(s)	Júlio Almeida (BRA)	545	9.4	10.7	9.6	10.3	7.9	9.6	9.5	9.7	8.0	10.2	94.9	639.9	
4	Hugo Hernandez (MEX)	549	7.7	8.0	7.7	9.8	10.6	7.0	9.5	10.1	9.0	9.0	88.4	637.4	
5	Yulio Zorrilla (CUB)	545	8.8	8.5	9.8	9.6	9.2	9.4	8.8	8.9	9.8	7.3	90.1	635.1	
6	Nickolaus Mowrer (USA)	545	9.4	10.2	7.6	8.8	8.8	10.5	7.8	9.2	9.5	7.6	89.4	634.4	
7	Stenio Yamamoto (BRA)	545	9.9	7.6	8.2	9.7	9.1	8.4	4.9	9.9	10.0	8.8	86.5	631.5	
8	Juan Olvera (MEX)	544	8.5	10.3	10.1	9.0	7.3	9.3	9.2	7.1	7.1	8.8	86.7	630.7	
