= Shooting at the 2011 Pan American Games – Men's 10 metre air pistol =

Shooting – Men's 10 metre air pistol at the 2011 Pan American Games
- Venue: Pan American Shooting Polygon
- Dates: October 16
- Competitors: 34 from 22 nations

Medalists
Gold medal	Daryl Szarenski	United States
Silver medal	Roger Daniel	Trinidad and Tobago
Bronze medal	Júlio Almeida	Brazil

The men's 10 metre air pistol shooting event at the 2011 Pan American Games was held on October 16 at the Pan American Shooting Polygon in Guadalajara. The defending Pan American Games champion was Jason Turner of the United States.

The event consisted of two rounds: a qualifier and a final. In the qualifier, each shooter fired 60 shots with an air pistol at 10 metres distance. Scores for each shot were in increments of 1, with a maximum score of 10.

The top 8 shooters in the qualifying round moved on to the final round. There, they fired an additional 10 shots. These shots scored in increments of .1, with a maximum score of 10.9. The total score from all 70 shots was used to determine final ranking.

Daryl Szarenski of the United States won the competition, earning his country a quota spot for the men's 10 metre air pistol event at the 2012 Summer Olympics in London, Great Britain.

== Schedule ==
All times are Central Standard Time (UTC−6).

Date	Time	Round
October 16, 2011	9:00	Qualification
October 16, 2011	14:00	Final

== Records ==
The existing world and Pan American Games records were as follows.

Qualification records
World record	Jong Oh Jin (KOR)	594	Changwon, South Korea	April 12, 2009
Pan American record	Jason Turner (USA)	579	Rio de Janeiro, Brazil	July 17, 2007

Final records
World record	Sergei Pyzhianov (URS)	695.1 (593+102.1)	Munich, Germany	October 13, 1989
Pan American record	Jason Turner (USA)	678.0 (579+99.0)	Rio de Janeiro, Brazil	July 17, 2007

== Results ==
=== Qualification round ===
34 athletes from 22 countries competed.

Rank	Athlete	Country	1	2	3	4	5	6	Total	Notes
1	Daryl Szarenski	United States	96	98	95	97	97	100	583	Q, PR
2	Roger Daniel	Trinidad and Tobago	98	96	96	97	95	95	577	Q
3	Alex Peralta	Colombia	97	95	97	94	98	95	576	Q
4	Will Brown	United States	93	99	97	96	94	96	575	Q
5	Júlio Almeida	Brazil	97	98	97	94	96	93	575	Q
6	Hugo Hernandez	Mexico	97	95	98	93	96	94	573	Q
7	Jorge Grau	Cuba	94	99	94	95	94	96	572	Q
8	Rudolf Knijnenburg	Bolivia	92	92	95	95	99	98	571	Q QS-Off 47.1
9	Sylvain Ouellette	Canada	96	94	97	93	94	97	571	QS-Off 45.8
10	Elieser Mora	Cuba	95	96	95	94	100	90	570	
11	Sergio Sanchez	Guatemala	95	95	96	95	94	94	569	
12	Manuel Sánchez	Chile	96	92	96	93	95	96	568	
13	Felipe Almeida Wu	Brazil	93	94	94	95	97	93	566	
14	Julio Molina	El Salvador	92	95	96	93	94	95	565	
15	Frank Bonilla	Venezuela	94	96	92	92	94	96	564	
16	Felipe Beuvrín	Venezuela	95	94	93	96	94	92	564	
17	Mario Vinueza	Ecuador	95	93	97	91	96	92	564	
18	Matias Orozco	Argentina	95	93	95	95	93	92	563	
19	Agustin Falco	Argentina	93	91	96	93	92	97	562	
20	Oscar Riccardi	Paraguay	93	98	92	94	89	94	560	
21	Aljeandro Garcia	Peru	95	95	91	94	93	91	559	
22	Phillip El Hage	Netherlands Antilles	90	94	94	90	93	98	559	
23	Antonio Tavarez	Mexico	90	94	92	94	95	93	558	
24	Ricardo Chandeck	Panama	92	95	93	92	95	91	558	
25	Marcelo DeSouza	Paraguay	93	90	92	92	92	95	554	
26	Josue Hernandez	Dominican Republic	91	91	92	90	94	95	553	
27	Enrique Arnaez	Peru	93	90	94	91	91	93	552	
28	Manuel Figuereo	Dominican Republic	92	89	90	92	94	93	550	
29	Alexand Huber	Chile	87	93	92	93	93	90	548	
30	Ronald Brown	Jamaica	89	89	93	93	93	91	548	
31	Calvert Herbert	Barbados	89	91	91	92	93	90	546	
32	Jaime Davila	Nicaragua	89	91	92	88	92	90	542	
33	Pablo Guerrero	Nicaragua	87	87	89	84	89	85	521	
34	Kevin Vanegas	Panama	87	87	82	86	88	89	519	

=== Final ===
Rank	Athlete	Qual	1	2	3	4	5	6	7	8	9	10	Final	Total	Notes
1st place, gold medalist(s)	Daryl Szarenski (USA)	583	9.4	9.9	10.5	9.1	8.4	10.5	9.7	10.5	10.5	10.2	98.7	681.7	FPR
2nd place, silver medalist(s)	Roger Daniel (TRI)	577	9.1	9.6	10.0	9.5	10.0	10.4	10.7	9.7	9.6	10.5	99.1	676.1	
3rd place, bronze medalist(s)	Júlio Almeida (BRA)	575	10.1	10.2	10.0	10.5	8.4	10.3	10.8	9.1	10.6	10.2	100.2	675.2	
4	Jorge Grau (CUB)	572	10.6	10.2	10.1	9.8	10.3	10.3	10.3	10.4	9.1	10.0	101.1	673.1	
5	Will Brown (USA)	575	9.9	10.0	9.8	10.0	10.2	9.8	8.5	10.4	9.9	8.9	97.4	672.4	
6	Hugo Hernandez (MEX)	573	9.9	10.9	9.0	9.3	9.3	9.4	9.5	10.9	10.7	9.9	98.8	669.8	
7	Rudolf Knijnenburg (BOL)	571	9.9	10.3	9.6	9.5	9.9	10.1	9.6	9.4	10.0	10.4	98.7	669.7	
8	Alex Peralta (COL)	576	10.4	9.3	9.8	9.6	8.9	9.3	7.1	10.3	9.7	8.9	93.3	669.3	
