= Racquetball at the 2019 Pan American Games – Men's team =

Racquetball – Men's team at the 2019 Pan American Games
- Venue: Racquetball Courts
- Dates: August 7-10, 2019
- Competitors: 22

Medalists
Gold medal	Carlos Keller; Roland Keller; Conrrado Moscoso	Bolivia
Silver medal	Sebastian Franco; Mario Mercado	Colombia
Bronze medal	Jake Bredenbeck; Rocky Carson; Charles Pratt	United States
Bronze medal	Álvaro Beltrán; Rodrigo Montoya; Javier Mar	Mexico

The Men's Team racquetball competition at the 2019 Pan American Games in Lima, Peru was held between August 7th and 10th, 2019 at the Racquetball courts located at the Villa Deportiva Regional del Callao cluster. Bolivia won the Men’s Team event for the first time in Pan American Games history, as Mexico had won the two previous Men's Team events in Racquetball at the Pan American Games.

== Schedule ==
All times are Central Standard Time (UTC-6).

Date	Time	Round
August 7, 2019	17:30	First Round
August 8, 2019	10:00	Quarterfinals
August 9, 2019	10:00	Semifinals
August 10, 2019	11:00	Final

== Playoffs ==
First Round
Cuba	2	0	0
Ecuador	0	2	2
Colombia	2	2
Peru	0	0
Argentina	0	0
Costa Rica	2	2
Guatemala	0	2	2
Dominican Republic	2	1	1

Quarterfinals
Mexico	2	2
Ecuador	0	0
Colombia	2	2
Canada	0	1
United States	2	2
Costa Rica	0	0
Guatemala	0	0
Bolivia	2	2

Semifinals
Mexico	0	2	1
Colombia	2	0	2
United States	2	1	1
Bolivia	1	2	2

Final
Colombia	0	2	0
Bolivia	2	1	2

== Final standings ==
Rank	Nation	Athlete
1st place, gold medalist(s)	Bolivia	Carlos Keller; Roland Keller; Conrrado Moscoso
2nd place, silver medalist(s)	Colombia	Sebastian Franco; Mario Mercado
3rd place, bronze medalist(s)	Mexico	Álvaro Beltrán; Rodrigo Montoya; Javier Mar
3rd place, bronze medalist(s)	United States	Jake Bredenbeck; Rocky Carson; Charles Pratt
5	Ecuador	Jose Ugalde; Fernando Rios
5	Canada	Samuel Murray; Coby Iwaasa
5	Costa Rica	Andrés Acuña; Felipe Camacho
5	Guatemala	Edwin Galicia; Juan Salvatierra
9	Cuba	Enier Chacón; Maykel Moyet
9	Peru	Jonathan Luque; Erik Mendoza
9	Argentina	Fernando Kurzbard; Shai Manzuri
9	Dominican Republic	Ramón de León; Luis Pérez
