= Racquetball at the 2019 Pan American Games – Women's doubles =

Racquetball – Women's doubles at the 2019 Pan American Games
- Venue: Racquetball Courts
- Dates: August 2–7, 2019
- Competitors: 22

Medalists
Gold medal	Paola Longoria; Samantha Salas	Mexico
Silver medal	Gabriela Martinez; Maria Rodriguez	Guatemala
Bronze medal	Kelani Lawrence; Rhonda Rajsich	United States
Bronze medal	Natalia Mendez; Maria Jose Vargas	Argentina

The women's doubles racquetball competition at the 2019 Pan American Games in Lima, Peru were held between August 2 and 7, 2019 at the Racquetball courts located at the Villa Deportiva Regional del Callao cluster. Paola Longoria and Samantha Salas of Mexico won gold for the third consecutive time, and their win was the fourth in a row for Mexico in Women's Doubles in Racquetball at the Pan American Games.

== Schedule ==
All times are Central Standard Time (UTC-6).

Date	Time	Round
August 2, 2019	10:00	Round Robin
August 3, 2019	10:00	Round Robin
August 4, 2019	10:00	Round Robin
August 5, 2019	10:00	Round of 16 & Quarterfinals
August 6, 2019	10:00	Semi-finals
August 7, 2019	10:00	Final

== Group stage ==
The competition begins with a round robin with athletes divided into groups. The results of the group stage were used to seed the teams for the medal round. Groups was announced at the technical meeting the day before the competition begins.

=== Pool A ===
Player	Nation	Pld	W	L	GF	GA	PF	PA	Difference
Paola Longoria & Samantha Salas	Mexico	2	2	0	4	0	60	21	39
Kelani Lawrence & Rhonda Rajsich	United States	2	1	1	2	2	44	41	3
Maria Jose Muñoz & María Paz Muñoz	Ecuador	2	0	2	0	4	18	60	-42

=== Pool B ===
Player	Nation	Pld	W	L	GF	GA	PF	PA	Difference
Natalia Mendez & Maria Jose Vargas	Argentina	3	3	0	6	0	90	30	60
Cristina Amaya & Adriana Riveros	Colombia	2	2	1	4	2	77	55	22
Carla Muñoz & Josefa Parada	Chile	3	1	2	2	5	52	97	-45
Loraine Felipe & Maria Regla Viera	Cuba	3	0	3	1	6	55	92	-37

=== Pool C ===
Player	Nation	Pld	W	L	GF	GA	PF	PA	Difference
Gabriela Martinez & Maria Rodriguez	Guatemala	3	3	0	6	2	95	64	31
Angélica Barrios & Jenny Daza	Bolivia	3	2	1	5	4	104	90	14
Merynanyelly Delgado & Alejandra Jiménez	Dominican Republic	3	1	2	3	5	68	100	-32
Frédérique Lambert & Jennifer Saunders	Canada	3	0	3	3	6	91	104	-13

== Playoffs ==
First Round
9	Merynanyelly Delgado (Dominican Republic) Alejandra Jiménez (DOM)	15	15
8	Carla Muñoz (Chile) Josefa Parada (CHI)	13	10
11	Loraine Felipe (Cuba) Maria Regla Viera (CUB)	6	4
6	Cristina Amaya (Colombia) Adriana Riveros (COL)	15	15
7	Maria Jose Muñoz (Ecuador) Maria Paz Muñoz (ECU)	9	15	5
10	Frédérique Lambert (Canada) Jennifer Saunders (CAN)	15	9	11

Quarterfinals
1	Paola Longoria (Mexico) Samantha Salas (MEX)	15	15
9	Merynanyelly Delgado (Dominican Republic) Alejandra Jiménez (DOM)	2	0
5	Kelani Lawrence (United States) Rhonda Rajsich (USA)	15	15
4	Angélica Barrios (Bolivia) Jenny Daza (BOL)	4	9
3	Gabriela Martinez (Guatemala) María Rodriguez (GUA)	12	15	11
6	Cristina Amaya (Colombia) Adriana Riveros (COL)	15	11	8
10	Frédérique Lambert (Canada) Jennifer Saunders (CAN)	9	9
2	Maria Jose Vargas (Argentina) Natalia Mendez (ARG)	15	15

Semifinals
1	Paola Longoria (Mexico) Samantha Salas (MEX)	15	15
5	Kelani Lawrence (United States) Rhonda Rajsich (USA)	6	1
3	Gabriela Martinez (Guatemala) Maria Rodriguez (GUA)	15	10	11
2	Maria Jose Vargas (Argentina) Natalia Mendez (ARG)	9	15	1

Final
1	Paola Longoria (Mexico) Samantha Salas (MEX)	15	11	11
3	Gabriela Martinez (Guatemala) Maria Rodriguez (GUA)	5	15	5
