= Racquetball at the 2011 Pan American Games – Qualification =

There will be a maximum of 60 athletes competing in racquetball (33 males and 27 females). All countries must compete in the 2011 Pan American Racquetball championship to qualify athletes to the games, including Mexico the host nation. After the tournament is completed each nation will be given scores for each event, and the top countries will qualify athletes. Each nation can enter the pairs and teams competition, provided they have qualified at least two athletes.

== Qualification summary ==
NOC (Note: NOCs with 2 entered athletes may also enter the team and pairs competition.)	Men	Women	Total athletes
Argentina	2	2	4
Bolivia	3	4	7
Canada	4	4	8
Colombia	4	1	5
Chile		2	2
Costa Rica	2		2
Guatemala		1	1
Dominican Republic	2	2	4
Ecuador	3	2	5
Honduras	2		2
Mexico	4	4	8
United States	4	4	8
Venezuela	3	2	5
Total athletes	33	28	61
Total NOCs	11	11	12

== Men ==
Event	Date	Location	Athletes per NOC	Qualified
2011 Pan American Racquetball Championship	April 16–23, 2011	(Nicaragua) Managua	4	Mexico; Canada; United States; Colombia
2011 Pan American Racquetball Championship	April 16–23, 2011	(Nicaragua) Managua	3	Venezuela; Ecuador; Bolivia
2011 Pan American Racquetball Championship	April 16–23, 2011	(Nicaragua) Managua	2	Argentina; Costa Rica; Dominican Republic; Honduras
TOTAL			33	

== Women ==
Event	Date	Location	Athletes per NOC	Qualified
2011 Pan American Racquetball Championship	April 16–23, 2011	(Nicaragua) Managua	4	Mexico; United States; Bolivia; Canada
2011 Pan American Racquetball Championship	April 16–23, 2011	(Nicaragua) Managua	2	Ecuador; Chile; Dominican Republic; Venezuela; Argentina
2011 Pan American Racquetball Championship	April 16–23, 2011	(Nicaragua) Managua	1	Colombia; Guatemala
TOTAL			28	
