= Racquetball at the 2019 Pan American Games – Women's singles =

Racquetball – Women's singles at the 2019 Pan American Games
- Venue: Racquetball Courts
- Dates: August 2–7, 2019
- Competitors: 24

Medalists
Gold medal	Paola Longoria	Mexico
Silver medal	Maria Jose Vargas	Argentina
Bronze medal	Adriana Riveros	Colombia
Bronze medal	Natalia Mendez	Argentina

The women's singles racquetball competition at the 2019 Pan American Games in Lima, Peru were held between August 2nd and 7th, 2019 at the Racquetball courts located at the Villa Deportiva Regional del Callao cluster. Paola Longoria of Mexico won gold in Women's Singles for a third consecutive time, and she's the most decorated women's player in Racquetball at the Pan American Games.

== Schedule ==
All times are Central Standard Time (UTC-6).

Date	Time	Round
August 2, 2019	10:00	Round Robin
August 3, 2019	10:00	Round Robin
August 4, 2019	10:00	Round Robin
August 5, 2019	10:00	Round of 16 & Quarterfinals
August 6, 2019	10:00	Semi-finals
August 7, 2019	10:00	Final

== Group stage ==
The competition begins with a round robin with athletes divided into groups. The top two athletes in each group advanced to the medal round. Groups was announced at the technical meeting the day before the competition begins.

=== Pool A ===
Player	Pld	W	L	GF	GA	PF	PA	Difference
(Argentina) Maria Jose Vargas	2	2	0	4	1	68	29	39
(Guatemala) Gabriela Martinez	2	1	1	3	2	58	50	8
(Dominican Republic) Alejandra Jiménez	2	0	2	0	4	13	60	-47

=== Pool B ===
Player	Pld	W	L	GF	GA	PF	PA	Difference
(Mexico) Paola Longoria	2	2	0	4	0	60	13	47
(Dominican Republic) Merynanyelly Delgado	2	1	1	2	3	37	58	-21
(Guatemala) Maria Rodriguez	2	0	2	1	4	36	62	-26

=== Pool C ===
Player	Pld	W	L	GF	GA	PF	PA	Difference
(Argentina) Natalia Mendez	2	2	0	4	0	60	29	31
(Colombia) Adriana Riveros	2	1	1	2	2	53	33	20
(Venezuela) Lilian Zea	2	0	2	0	4	9	60	-51

=== Pool D ===
Player	Pld	W	L	GF	GA	PF	PA	Difference
(United States) Rhonda Rajsich	2	2	0	4	0	60	26	34
(Mexico) Montserrat Mejia	2	1	1	2	2	41	47	-6
(Canada) Frédérique Lambert	2	0	2	0	4	32	60	-28

=== Pool E ===
Player	Pld	W	L	GF	GA	PF	PA	Difference
(Bolivia) Valeria Centellas	3	3	0	6	1	100	47	53
(Colombia) Cristina Amaya	3	2	1	5	2	98	52	48
(Cuba) Maria Regla Viera	3	1	2	2	4	43	65	-22
(Chile) Josefa Parada	3	0	3	0	6	13	90	-77

=== Pool F ===
Player	Pld	W	L	GF	GA	PF	PA	Difference
(Ecuador) Maria Paz Muñoz	3	3	0	6	0	90	49	41
(United States) Kelani Lawrence	3	2	1	4	2	71	58	13
(Costa Rica) Maricruz Ortiz	3	1	2	2	5	83	91	-8
(Canada) Jennifer Saunders	3	0	3	1	6	54	100	-46

=== Pool G ===
Player	Pld	W	L	GF	GA	PF	PA	Difference
(Bolivia) Angélica Barrios	3	3	0	6	0	90	41	49
(Chile) Carla Muñoz	3	2	1	4	2	79	49	30
(Ecuador) Maria Jose Muñoz	3	1	2	2	4	43	66	-23
(Cuba) Loraine Felipe	3	0	3	0	6	34	90	-56

== Playoffs ==
Round of 16
8	Carla Muñoz (CHI)	10	15	7
9	Kelani Lawrence (USA)	15	11	11
5	Valeria Centellas (BOL)	15	11	8
12	Adriana RIveros (COL)	6	15	11
13	Merynanyelly Delgado (DOM)	8	14
4	Rhonda Rajsich (USA)	15	15
3	Natalia Mendez (ARG)	15	12	11
Gabriela Martinez (GUA)	10	15	6
11	Montserrat Mejia (MEX)	14	15	5
6	Maria Paz Muñoz (ECU)	15	7	11
7	Angélica Barrios (BOL)	15	12	11
10	Cristina Amaya (COL)	11	15	10

Quarterfinals
1	Maria Jose Vargas (ARG)	15	15
9	Kelani Lawrence (USA)	9	13
12	Adriana Riveros (COL)	15	15
4	Rhonda Rajsich (USA)	10	10
3	Natalia Mendez (ARG)	15	10	11
6	Maria Paz Muñoz (ECU)	5	15	7
7	Angélica Barrios (BOL)	6	4
2	Paola Longoria (MEX)	15	15

Semifinals
1	Maria Jose Vargas (ARG)	15	15
12	Adriana Riveros (COL)	8	9
3	Natalia Mendez (ARG)	10	10
2	Paola Longoria (MEX)	15	15

Final
1	Maria Jose Vargas (ARG)	7	9
2	Paola Longoria (MEX)	15	15
