= Racquetball at the 2015 Pan American Games – Qualification =

== Qualification ==
A total of 56 athletes will qualify to compete at the Games (30 male, 26 female). Each country is allowed to enter a maximum of four male and four female athletes. The top 10 men's and top 9 women's teams at the 2015 Pan American Championship qualified to compete at the games. Hosts Canada will be allowed to maximum quota of four male and four female athletes.

== Qualification timeline ==
Event	Date	Venue
2015 Pan American Racquetball Championship	March 27 – April 4	(Dominican Republic) Santo Domingo

== Qualification summary ==
NOC	Men	Women	Athletes
Argentina	2	2	4
Bolivia	3	3	6
Canada	4	4	8
Chile		2	2
Colombia	3	2	5
Costa Rica	3		3
Cuba		1	1
Dominican Republic	2		2
Ecuador	3	2	4
Guatemala	2	2	4
Mexico	3	3	6
United States	4	3	7
Venezuela	2	2	4
Total: 13 NOC's	30	26	56

== Men ==
Event	Athletes per NOC	Qualified
Host nation	4	Canada
2015 Pan American Racquetball Championship	4	United States
2015 Pan American Racquetball Championship	3	Mexico; Bolivia; Costa Rica; Colombia
2015 Pan American Racquetball Championship	2	Dominican Republic; Ecuador; Venezuela; Argentina; Guatemala
TOTAL	30	

== Women ==
Event	Athletes per NOC	Qualified
Host nation	4	Canada
2015 Pan American Racquetball Championship	3	United States; Argentina; Bolivia; Mexico
2015 Pan American Racquetball Championship	2	Colombia; Ecuador; Venezuela; Chile; Guatemala
2015 Pan American Racquetball Championship	1	Cuba
TOTAL	26	
