= Shooting at the 2015 Pan American Games – Men's 50 metre pistol =

Shooting – Men's 50 metre pistol at the 2015 Pan American Games
- Venue: Pan Am Shooting Centre
- Dates: July 17
- Competitors: 26 from 18 nations
- Winning score: 189.1

Medalists
Gold medal	Júlio Almeida	Brazil
Silver medal	Jorge Grau	Cuba
Bronze medal	Marko Carrillo	Peru

The men's 50 metre pistol shooting event at the 2015 Pan American Games was held on July 17 at the Pan Am Shooting Centre in Innisfil.

== Background ==
The event consisted of two rounds: a qualifier and a final. In the qualifier, each shooter fired 60 shots with a pistol at a distance of 50 metres. Scores for each shot were in increments of 1 point, with a maximum score of 10 per shot.

The top 8 shooters from the qualifying round advanced to the final. In the final, they fired an additional 10 shots. These shots were scored in increments of 0.1, with a maximum score of 10.9 per shot. The total score from all 70 shots was used to determine the final ranking.

The winners of all fifteen events, along with the runner-up in the men's air rifle, skeet, trap and both women's rifle events, qualified for the 2016 Summer Olympics in Rio de Janeiro, Brazil, provided the athlete has not yet secured a quota for their country.

== Schedule ==
All times are Central Standard Time (UTC-6).

Date	Time	Round
July 17, 2015	9:15	Qualification
July 17, 2015	13:30	Final

== Results ==
=== Qualification round ===
Rank	Athlete	Country	1	2	3	4	5	6	Total	Notes
1	Jorge Grau	Cuba	93	93	91	95	94	91	557-10x	Q
2	Stênio Yamamoto	Brazil	93	93	89	93	88	91	547-08x	Q
3	Rudolf Knijnenburg	Bolivia	94	95	90	89	90	89	547-06x	Q
4	Marko Carrillo	Peru	89	90	89	91	92	94	545-04x	Q
5	Alex Peralta	Colombia	87	92	87	93	91	91	541-04x	Q
6	Júlio Almeida	Brazil	94	92	90	91	84	88	539-07x	Q
7	Nick Mowrer	United States	94	90	85	92	89	88	538-06x	Q
8	Gustavo Yaunner	Cuba	82	89	91	93	93	87	535-08x	Q
9	Mario Vinueza	Ecuador	91	90	87	86	95	86	535-05x	
10	Edilio Centeno	Venezuela	88	92	90	91	92	90	533-06x	
11	Maurilio Morales	Mexico	80	94	89	92	89	88	532-04x	
12	Mark Hynes	Canada	90	90	90	90	91	81	532-04x	
13	Fernando Pozo Neira	Ecuador	92	91	89	87	83	89	531-05x	
14	Giovanni Gonzalez Rivera	Puerto Rico	92	84	87	84	94	90	531-01x	
15	David Muñoz	Panama	89	89	87	87	88	90	530-06x	
16	Enrique Arnaez	Peru	92	90	84	85	88	90	529-04x	
17	Jason Turner	United States	88	86	88	89	91	86	528-05x	
18	Marcos Núñez	Venezuela	93	86	88	87	86	82	522-05x	
19	Jose Castillo Aguilar	Guatemala	82	90	86	86	90	87	521-08x	
20	Roger Daniel	Trinidad and Tobago	91	84	86	92	85	83	521-03x	
21	Manuel Sanchez	Chile	84	89	89	85	86	87	520-05x	
22	Sergio Sánchez	Guatemala	88	84	88	87	88	81	516-05x	
23	Sebastian Lobo	Argentina	86	90	88	81	87	83	515-07x	
24	Josue Hernandez Caba	Dominican Republic	84	76	82	85	92	85	504-04x	
25	Jorge Pimentel	El Salvador	84	87	76	79	92	85	503-03x	
26	Francisco Yanisselly	Panama	80	72	83	89	82	91	497-05x	

=== Final ===
Rank	Athlete	Country	1	2	3	4	5	6	7	8	9	Total	Notes
1st place, gold medalist(s)	Júlio Almeida	Brazil	29.6; 9.7; 9.9; 10.0	59.7; 10.0; 10.6; 9.5	79.0; 9.5; 9.8	97.6; 8.7; 9.9	115.6; 8.8; 9.2	133.3; 8.0; 9.7	152.2; 9.2; 9.7	169.8; 7.1; 10.5	189.1; 9.8; 9.5	189.1	FPR
2nd place, silver medalist(s)	Jorge Grau	Cuba	28.6; 10.1; 9.9; 8.6	57.8; 9.5; 9.6; 10.1	78.3; 10.1; 10.4	94.6; 9.4; 6.9	114.2; 9.6; 10.0	131.4; 8.5; 8.7	149.8; 9.2; 9.2	169.4; 10.3; 9.3	186.8; 8.3; 9.1	186.8	
3rd place, bronze medalist(s)	Marko Carrillo	Peru	28.5; 9.7; 8.7; 10.1	57.5; 10.0; 9.7; 9.3	76.0; 8.9; 9.6	95.2; 9.1; 10.1	115.5; 10.7; 9.6	132.7; 8.8; 8.4	152.0; 9.8; 9.5	165.9; 7.4; 6.5	165.9	165.9	
4	Gustavo Yaunner	Cuba	29.8; 9.2; 10.6; 10.0	56.2; 10.0; 8.6; 7.8	76.2; 10.0; 10.0	95.5; 8.7; 10.6	112.4; 8.1; 8.8	130.3; 8.6; 9.3	148.2; 8.2; 9.7	148.2	148.2	148.2	
5	Nick Mowrer	United States	30.3; 10.4; 9.0; 10.9	58.2; 8.5; 9.0; 10.4	77.2; 9.4; 9.6	93.6; 8.9; 7.5	112.6; 10.3; 8.7	129.9; 9.3; 8.0	129.9	129.9	129.9	129.9	
6	Rudolf Knijnenburg	Bolivia	28.3; 9.1; 10.2; 9.0	58.2; 8.8; 10.5; 10.6	77.6; 9.6; 9.8	94.9; 8.0; 9.3	107.8; 8.4; 4.5	107.8	107.8	107.8	107.8	107.8	
7	Stênio Yamamoto	Brazil	27.8; 9.4; 9.4; 9.0	57.8; 9.6; 9.9; 10.5	72.9; 10.1; 5.0	89.8; 9.4; 7.5	89.8	89.8	89.8	89.8	89.8	89.8	
8	Alex Peralta	Colombia	28.4; 9.9; 8.6; 9.9	54.0; 7.2; 9.7; 8.7	70.0; 7.1; 8.9	70.0	70.0	70.0	70.0	70.0	70.0	70.0	
