= Racquetball at the 2015 Pan American Games – Men's team =

Racquetball – Men's team at the 2015 Pan American Games
- Venue: Exhibition Centre – Hall C
- Dates: July 24 - July 26
- Competitors: 30 from 11 nations

Medalists
Gold medal	Álvaro Beltrán; Daniel De La Rosa; Javier Moreno	Mexico
Silver medal	Jansen Allen; Jake Bredenbeck; Rocky Carson; Jose Rojas	United States
Bronze medal	Vincent Gagnon; Mike Green; Coby Iwaasa; Tim Landeryou	Canada
Bronze medal	Carlos Keller; Roland Keller; Conrrado Moscoso	Bolivia

The men's team competition of the racquetball events at the 2015 Pan American Games was held from July 24–26 at the Direct Energy Centre (Exhibition Centre), in Toronto, Canada. Mexico is the defending Men's Team Pan American Games champion.

== Schedule ==
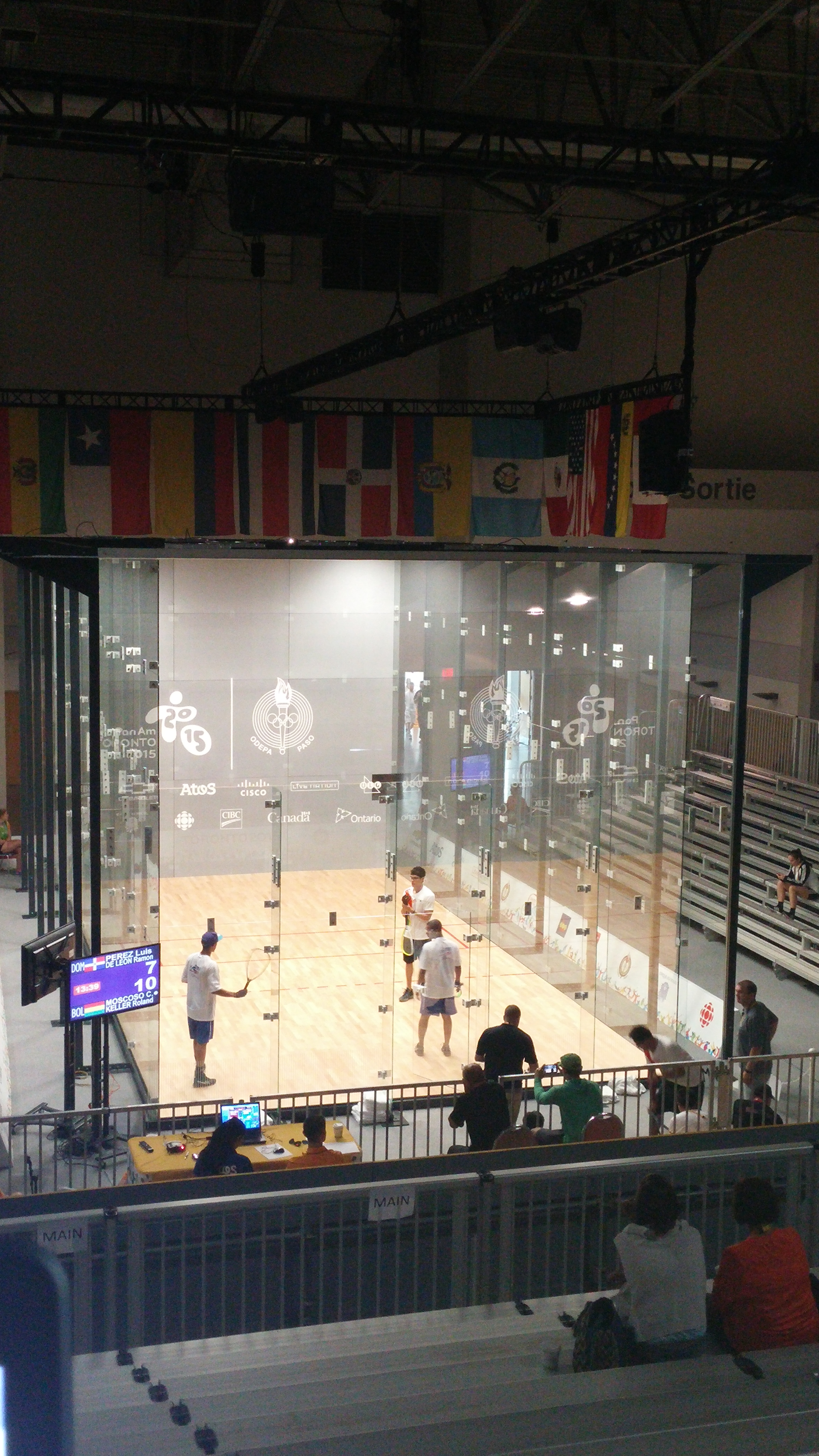
The Direct Energy Centre (Exhibition Centre), Hall C, was the venue for the racquetball competitions

All times are Central Standard Time (UTC-6).

Date	Time	Round
July 24, 2015	17:05	First Round
July 25, 2015	9:50	Quarterfinals
July 25, 2015	17:05	Semifinals
July 26, 2015	9:05	Final

== Playoffs ==
First Round
Guatemala	1	2	0
Venezuela	2	1	2
Ecuador
Colombia	WO
Costa Rica	2	0	2
Argentina	1	2	1

Quarterfinals
United States	2	2
Venezuela	0	0
Dominican Republic	0	2	0
Canada	2	1	2
Bolivia	2	2
Colombia	0	1
Costa Rica	1	2	1
Mexico	2	0	2

Semifinals
United States	2	0	2
Canada	0	2	0
Bolivia	0	2	1
Mexico	2	1	2

Final
United States	0	0
Mexico	2	2

== Final standings ==
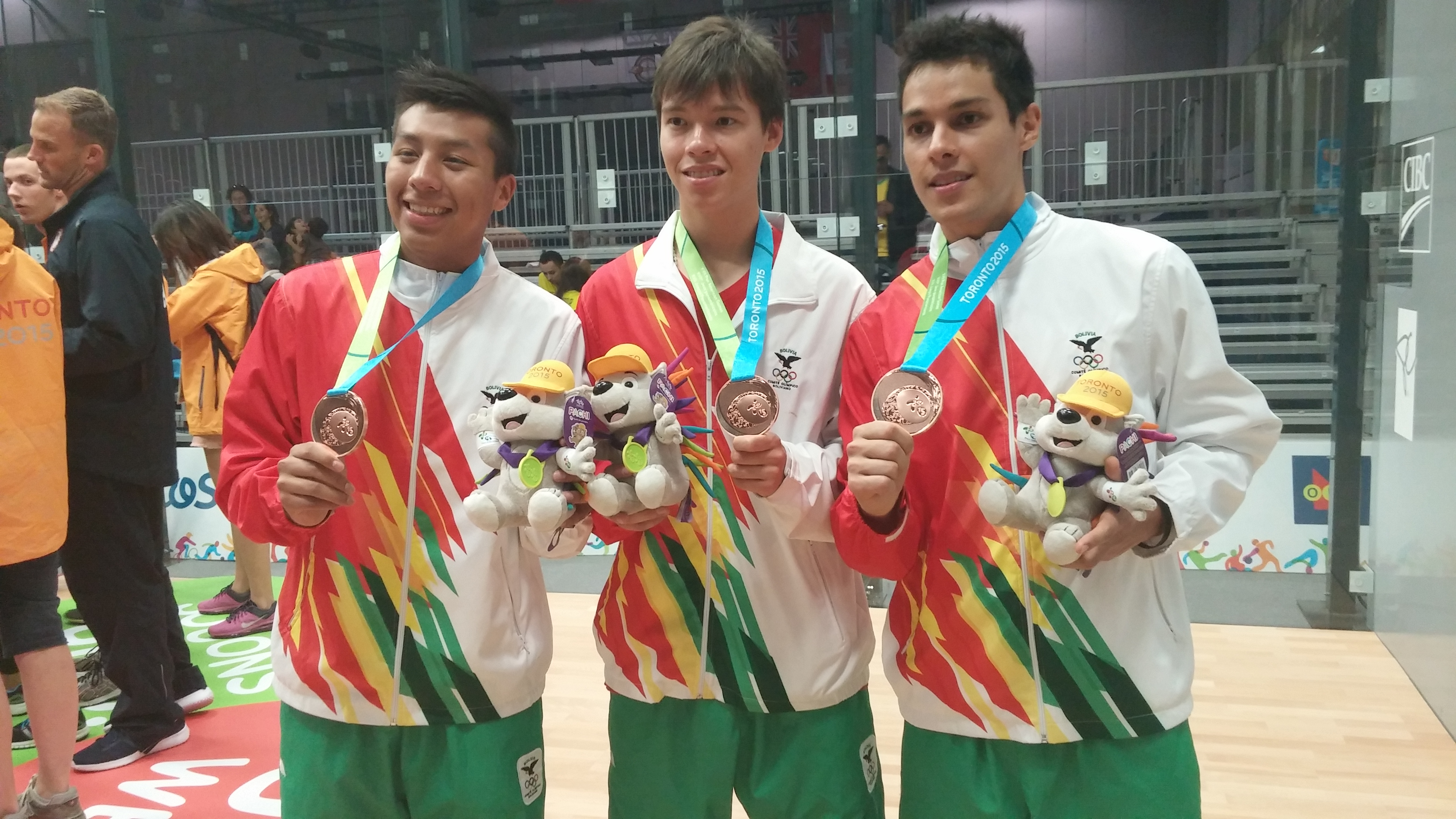
Bolivia's bronze medal-winning men's team

Rank	Nation	Athlete
1st place, gold medalist(s)	Mexico	Álvaro Beltrán; Daniel De La Rosa; Javier Moreno
2nd place, silver medalist(s)	United States	Jansen Allen; Jake Bredenbeck; Rocky Carson; Jose Rojas
3rd place, bronze medalist(s)	Canada	Vincent Gagnon; Mike Green; Coby Iwaasa; Tim Landeryou
3rd place, bronze medalist(s)	Bolivia	Carlos Keller; Roland Keller; Conrrado Moscoso
5	Venezuela	Cesar Castillo; Cesar Castro
5	Dominican Republic	Ramón de León; Luis Pérez
5	Colombia	Set De Jesus Cubillos; Sebastian Franco; Alejandro Herrera
5	Costa Rica	Andrés Acuña; Felipe Camacho; Teobaldo Fumero
9	Guatemala	Edwin Galicia; Christian Wer
9	Ecuador	Jose Alvarez; Fernando Rios
9	Argentina	Daniel Maggi; Shai Manzuri
