= Agnes Kay Eppers =

Bolivian cyclist and triathlete

Personal information
- Full name: Agnes Kay Eppers Reynders
- Born: 17 November 1971 (age 54) Bolivia

Cycling career
- Sport: Cycling
- Disciplines: Road cycling, Triathlon

Agnes Kay Eppers Reynders (born 17 November 1971) is a road cyclist from Bolivia. She represented her nation at the 2000 and 2005 UCI Road World Championships. She also competed in the triathlon at the 1999, 2003 and 2007 Pan American Games.
