= Bolivia at the 2007 Pan American Games =

- IOC code: BOL
- NOC: Comité Olímpico Boliviano
- Website: web.archive.org/web/20141030221607/http://www.cobol.org.bo/

in Rio de Janeiro 13–29 July 2007
- Competitors: 54
- Flag bearer: Giovana Irusta
- Medals Ranked 33rd: Gold 0 Silver 0 Bronze 0 Total 0

Pan American Games appearances (overview)
- 1967; 1971; 1975; 1979; 1983; 1987; 1991; 1995; 1999; 2003; 2007; 2011; 2015; 2019; 2023; 2027

The 15th Pan American Games were held in Rio de Janeiro, Brazil from 13 July to 29 July 2007.

== Results by event ==
=== Athletics ===
Men's 800 metres

- Fadrique Iglesias
  - Semifinal 3 — 1:48.27 (→ did not advance)

Men's 5,000 metres

- Eduardo Aruquipa
  - Final — 14:50.34 (→ 10th place)
- Jorge César Fernández
  - Final — 15:36.57 (→ 12th place)

Women's 400m Hurdles

- Daisy Ugarte
  - Semifinal 1 — 1:00.26 (→ did not advance)

Women's 20 km walk

- Geovana Irusta
  - Final — DSQ (→ no ranking)

=== Football ===
==== Men's tournament ====
- Preliminary Round
15 July
14:00

Mexico	1 – 1	Bolivia
Esqueda 63'		Gutiérrez 26'

18 July
15:00

Bolivia	4 – 2	United States
Pinedo 47', 81'; Fierro 56'; Gutiérrez 63'		O. González 34', 41'

21 July
10:00

Venezuela	0 – 2	Bolivia
		Fierro 7', 34'

- Semi Finals
24 July
19:00

Bolivia	0 – 1	Ecuador
		Delgado 64'

- Bronze-medal match
27 July
12:00

Bolivia	0 – 1	Mexico
		Esqueda 73'

=== Triathlon ===
==== Men's Competition ====
- Luis Torrico
  - did not finish — no ranking

==== Women's Competition ====
- Agnes Eppers
  - did not finish — no ranking

== See also ==
- Bolivia at the 2008 Summer Olympics
