= Bolivia at the 2019 Pan American Games =

- IOC code: BOL
- NOC: Bolivian Olympic Committee

in Lima, Peru 26 July–11 August 2019
- Competitors: 49 in 17 sports
- Flag bearer: Conrrado Moscoso (opening)
- Medals Ranked 19th: Gold 1 Silver 2 Bronze 2 Total 5

Pan American Games appearances (overview)
- 1967; 1971; 1975; 1979; 1983; 1987; 1991; 1995; 1999; 2003; 2007; 2011; 2015; 2019; 2023

Bolivia competed at the 2019 Pan American Games in Lima, Peru from July 26 to August 11, 2019.

Bolivia's consisted of 49 athletes (28 men and 21 women), the highest the country has ever sent to one edition of the Pan American Games. On July 4, 2019, racquetball athlete Conrrado Moscoso was named as the country's flag bearer during the opening ceremony.

On August 10, 2019, Carlos Keller, Roland Keller and Conrrado Moscoso won the gold medal in the racquetball men's team competition, surpassing the bronze medal won four years earlier in at the 2015 Pan American Games in Toronto. Reserve Kadim Carrasco was also awarded a medal. This marked Bolivia's first ever gold medal at the Pan American Games. Overall the country won five medals, the most at any edition of the games, and ranked 19th overall.

== Competitors ==
The following is the list of number of competitors (per gender) participating at the games per sport/discipline.

Sport	Men	Women	Total
Archery	0	3	3
Athletics (track and field)	3	2	5
Badminton	0	1	1
Basque pelota	1	0	1
Bodybuilding	1	1	2
Canoeing	1	0	1
Cycling	2	1	3
Equestrian	1	0	1
Golf	0	2	2
Gymnastics	1	2	3
Karate	1	0	1
Modern pentathlon	2	2	4
Racquetball	4	3	7
Shooting	5	2	7
Swimming	3	1	4
Tennis	2	1	3
Triathlon	1	0	1
Total	28	21	49

== Medalists ==
The following competitors from Bolivia won medals at the games. In the by discipline sections below, medalists' names are bolded.

Medal	Name	Sport	Event	Date
Gold	Carlos Keller; Roland Keller; Conrrado Moscoso; Kadim Carrasco	Racquetball	Men's Team	August 10
Silver	Roland Keller; Conrrado Moscoso	Racquetball	Men's Doubles	August 7
Silver	Federico Zeballos; Noelia Zeballos	Tennis	Mixed Doubles	August 3
Bronze	Conrrado Moscoso	Racquetball	Men's Singles	August 6
Bronze	Angelica Barrios; Valeria Centellas; Jenny Daza	Racquetball	Women's Team	August 9

**Medals by sport**
**Sport**	1st place, gold medalist(s)	2nd place, silver medalist(s)	3rd place, bronze medalist(s)	**Total**
Racquetball	1	1	2	**4**
Tennis	0	1	0	**1**
**Total**	**1**	**2**	**2**	**5**

**Medals by day**
**Day**	**Date**	1st place, gold medalist(s)	2nd place, silver medalist(s)	3rd place, bronze medalist(s)	Total
8	August 3	0	1	0	1
11	August 6	0	0	1	1
12	August 7	0	1	0	1
14	August 9	0	0	1	1
15	August 10	1	0	0	1
**Total**		**1**	**2**	**2**	**5**

**Medals by gender**
**Gender**	1st place, gold medalist(s)	2nd place, silver medalist(s)	3rd place, bronze medalist(s)	**Total**
Female	0	0	1	**1**
Male	1	1	1	**3**
Mixed	0	0	1	**1**
**Total**	**1**	**2**	**2**	**5**

== Archery ==
Bolivia qualified a recurve women's team of three athletes by finishing in the top six at the 2018 Pan American Championships in Medellín, Colombia.

Athlete	Event	Ranking Round		Round of 32	Round of 16	Quarterfinals	Semifinals	Final / BM	Rank
Athlete	Event	Score	Seed	Opposition Score	Opposition Score	Opposition Score	Opposition Score	Opposition Score	Rank
Dahara Claros	Recurve individual	537	31 Q	Kaufhold (USA); L 0–6	Did not advance				
Ebe Fernandez	Recurve individual	592	25 Q	Mickelberry (USA); L 0–6	Did not advance				
Ana Garcia	Recurve individual	520	32 Q	Valencia (MEX); L 0–6	Did not advance				
Dahara Claros; Ebe Fernandez; Ana Garcia	Recurve team	1649	8 Q	—N/a		Mexico; L 0–6	Did not advance		

== Athletics (track and field) ==
Bolivia qualified five track and field athletes (three men and two women).

Key

- Note–Ranks given for track events are for the entire round
- PB = Personal best
- SB = Seasonal best
- DSQ = Disqualified

Track and road events

Athlete	Event	Final	
Athlete	Event	Result	Rank
Daniel Toroya	Men's 5000 m	14:02.96	11
Vidal Basco	Men's 10,000 m	28:34.37 PB	4
Ronald Quispe	Men's 50 km walk	DSQ	
Tania Chavez	Women's 3000 m steeplechase	DSQ	
Ángela Castro	Women's 20 km walk	1:32:15 SB	5

== Badminton ==
Bolivia received a reallocated quota spot for a female athlete. This marked the country's Pan American Games debut in the sport.

Women

Athlete	Event	Round of 64	Round of 32	Round of 16	Quarterfinals	Semifinals	Final	Rank
Athlete	Event	Opposition Result	Opposition Result	Opposition Result	Opposition Result	Opposition Result	Opposition Result	Rank
Juanita Siviora	Singles	Williams (BAR); L 0–2 (7–21, 4–21)	Did not advance					

== Basque pelota ==
Bolivia qualified one male athlete in basque pelota.

Men

Athlete	Event	Group stage			Semifinals	Final / BM	
Athlete	Event	Opposition Result	Opposition Result	Rank	Opposition Result	Opposition Result	Rank
Josias Bazo	Individual hand fronton	Nelson (CUB); L 0–2	Quinto (PER); W 2–0	2 Q	Alvarez (CHI); L 0–2	Otheguy (BRA); L 0–2	4

== Bodybuilding ==
Bolivia qualified a full team of two bodybuilders (one male and one female).

Athlete	Event	Prejudging		Final	
Athlete	Event	Points	Rank	Points	Rank
Ayrton Medrano	Men's classic bodybuilding	—N/a		Did not advance	
Estefania Ninaja	Women's bikini fitness	—N/a		Did not advance	

- No results were provided for the prejudging round, with only the top six advancing.

== Canoeing ==
=== Slalom ===
Bolivia qualified one male canoe slalom athlete. This marked the country's debut in the discipline at the Pan American Games.

Key

- Note–Ranks given are within the heat

Men

Athlete(s)	Event	Heat						Semifinal		Final	
Athlete(s)	Event	Run 1	Rank	Run 2	Rank	Best	Rank	Time	Rank	Time	Rank
Juan Singuri	K-1	204.65	10	151.51	10	151.51	10	Did not advance			
Juan Singuri	Extreme K-1	—N/a	DNF	—N/a				Did not advance			

== Cycling ==
Bolivia qualified one male cyclist in the BMX discipline. Bolivia was later reallocated an additional quota in men's BMX and a women's quota in the road/track events.

=== BMX ===
Men

Athlete	Event	Time trial		Quarterfinal		Semifinal		Final	
Athlete	Event	Result	Rank	Points	Rank	Time	Rank	Time	Rank
Jamie Quintanilla	Racing	35.897	16	12	4 Q	20	7	Did not advance	
Igor Vaca	Racing	36.790	18	15	5	Did not advance			

=== Road ===
Women

Athlete	Event	Final	
Athlete	Event	Time	Rank
Micaela Sarabia Ricaldez	Road race	2:32:47	36
Micaela Sarabia Ricaldez	Time trial	30:07.63	20

=== Track ===
Women
Keirin

Athlete	Event	1st round	Repechage	Final/Placement
Athlete	Event	Rank	Rank	Rank
Micaela Sarabia Ricaldez	Keirin	5 R	7 QB	Did not start

Omnium

Athlete	Event	Scratch		Tempo		Elimination		Points race		Total points	
Athlete	Event	Points	Rank	Points	Rank	Points	Rank	Points	Rank	Points	Rank
Micaela Sarabia Ricaldez	Omnium	10	16	10	16	8	17	Did not finish			

== Equestrian ==
Bolivia qualified one athlete in equestrian.

=== Jumping ===
Athlete	Horse	Event	Qualification								Final					
Athlete	Horse	Event	Round 1		Round 2		Round 3		Total		Round A		Round B		Total	
Athlete	Horse	Event	Faults	Rank	Faults	Rank	Faults	Rank	Faults	Rank	Faults	Rank	Faults	Rank	Faults	Rank
Daniel Bedoya	Quattro	Individual	7.76	26	8	15	24	40	39.76	33 Q	17	25	Did not advance			

== Golf ==
Bolivia qualified two female golfers.

Women

Athlete(s)	Event	Final						
Athlete(s)	Event	Round 1	Round 2	Round 3	Round 4	Total	To par	Rank
Maria Jose Savoca Cespedes	Individual	83	80	83	78	324	+40	31
Luciana Calbimonte Osorio	Individual	77	87	80	77	321	+37	30

== Gymnastics ==
=== Artistic ===
Bolivia qualified one male and one female artistic gymnast. Bolivia was later reallocated an additional female quota.

Men

Athlete	Event	Qualification						Total	Rank	Final						Total	Rank
Athlete	Event	F	PH	R	V	PB	HB	Total	Rank	F	PH	R	V	PB	HB	Total	Rank
Gustavo Cumali	Individual all-around	10.350	8.500	9.750	11.800	8.675	8.650	57.725	41	Did not advance							

Women

Athlete	Event	Qualification				Total	Rank	Final				Total	Rank
Athlete	Event	V	UB	BB	F	Total	Rank	V	UB	BB	F	Total	Rank
Maria Arauz	Individual all-around	12.700	9.750	9.550	8.850	41.250	37	Did not advance					
Diana Vazquez	Individual all-around	13.200	9.350	10.750	10.950	44.250	35	Did not advance					

== Karate ==
Bolivia qualified one male karateka in the 84 kg kumite event, after finishing in the top two qualifying positions from the 2018 South American Games.

Kumite
Men

Athlete	Event	Round Robin				Semifinals	Final / BM	
Athlete	Event	Opposition Result	Opposition Result	Opposition Result	Rank	Opposition Result	Opposition Result	Rank
Mohamed Yussuf	–84 kg	Cuevas (MEX); L 0–2	Madani (USA); L 0–2	Macedo (URU); L 0–4	4	Did not advance		

== Modern pentathlon ==
Bolivia qualified four modern pentathletes (two men and two women). The team was officially named on May 21, 2019.

Individual

Athlete	Event	Fencing (Épée One Touch + Bonus round)			Swimming (200m Freestyle)			Riding (Show Jumping)			Shooting/Running (10 m Air Pistol/3000m)			Total Points	Final Rank
Athlete	Event	Wins	Rank	MP points	Time	Rank	MP points	Time	Rank	MP points	Time	Rank	MP points	Total Points	Final Rank
Said Rollano	Men's	7	31	145	2:36.04	30	238	EL		0	12:43.00	27	537	920	31
Daniel Tiñini	Men's	12	24	180	2:22.70	25	265	83.13	16	267	12:50.00	28	530	1242	17
Mariela Ayala	Women's	12	22	180	3:28.89	31	133	EL		0	15:27.00	25	373	686	29
Fátima Cabrera	Women's	7	28	145	2:44.22	25	222	DNF		0	14:51.00	22	409	776	26

Relay

Athlete	Event	Fencing (Épée One Touch + Bonus round)			Swimming (200m Freestyle)			Riding (Show Jumping)			Shooting/Running (10 m Air Pistol/3000m)			Total Points	Final Rank
Athlete	Event	Wins	Rank	MP points	Time	Rank	MP points	Time	Rank	MP points	Time	Rank	MP points	Total Points	Final Rank
Said Rollano; Daniel Tiñini	Men's	11	10	194	2:14.76	12	281	164.6	11	192	11:51.00	10	589	1256	10
Mariela Ayala; Fátima Cabrera	Women's	8	11	150	2:53.55	11	DNS			DNF					
Daniel Tiñini; Fátima Cabrera	Mixed	20 + 2	9	196	2:18.02	12	274	147.95	11	249	12:44.00	10	536	1255	10

== Racquetball ==
Bolivia qualified seven racquetball athletes (four men and three women).

Men

Athlete	Event	Qualifying Round robin				Round of 16	Quarterfinals	Semifinals	Final	Rank
Athlete	Event	Match 1	Match 2	Match 3	Rank	Opposition Result	Opposition Result	Opposition Result	Opposition Result	Rank
Carlos Keller	Men's singles	Mercado (COL); L 0–2	Salvatierra (GUA); W 2–0	—N/a	2 Q	Murray (CAN); L 1–2	Did not advance			
Conrrado Moscoso	Men's singles	Acuna (CRC); W 2–1	Ugalde (ECU); L 1–2	—N/a	1 Q	Bye	Pratt (USA); W 2–0	Montoya (MEX); L 0–2	Did not advance	3rd place, bronze medalist(s)
Roland Keller; Conrrado Moscoso	Men's doubles	Franco / Mercado (COL); W 2–0	Mendiguri / Luque (PER); W 2–0	Rios / Ugalde (ECU); W 2–0	1 Q	Bye	Moyet / Chacon (CUB); W 2–0	Acuna / Camacho (CRC); W 2–1	Montoya / MAR (MEX); L 1–2	2nd place, silver medalist(s)
Carlos Keller; Roland Keller; Conrrado Moscoso; Kadim Carrasco	Men's team	—N/a				Bye	Guatemala; W 2–0	United States; W 2–1	Colombia; W 2–1	1st place, gold medalist(s)

- Kadim Carrasco did not compete in any matches.

Women

Athlete	Event	Qualifying Round robin				Round of 16	Quarterfinals	Semifinals	Final	Rank
Athlete	Event	Match 1	Match 2	Match 3	Rank	Opposition Result	Opposition Result	Opposition Result	Opposition Result	Rank
Angelica Barrios	Singles	Munoz (ECU); W 2–0	Munoz (CHI); W 2–0	Felipe (CUB); W 2–0	1 Q	Amaya (COL); W 2–1	Longoria (MEX); L 0–2	Did not advance		
Valeria Centellas	Singles	Amaya (COL); W 2–1	Parada (CHI); W 2–0	Viera (CUB); W 2–0	1 Q	Riveros (COL); L 1–2	Did not advance			
Angelica Barrios; Jenny Daza	Doubles	Lambert / Saunders (CAN); W 2–1	Rodriguez / Martinez (GUA); L 1–2	Jimenez / Delgado (DOM); W 2–1	2 Q	Bye	Lawrence / Rajsich (USA); L 0–2	Did not advance		
Angelica Barrios; Valeria Centellas; Jenny Daza	Team	—N/a				Cuba; W 2–0	Guatemala; W 2–0	Argentina; L 0–2	Did not advance	3rd place, bronze medalist(s)

== Shooting ==
Bolivia qualified seven sport shooters (five men and two women).

Men

Athlete	Event	Qualification		Final	
Athlete	Event	Points	Rank	Points	Rank
Rudolf Knijnenburg	10 m air pistol	568	12	Did not advance	
Rudolf Knijnenburg	25 m rapid fire pistol	537	19	Did not advance	
Diego Cossio Quiroga	25 m rapid fire pistol	554	12	Did not advance	
Gabriel Chambi	10 m air rifle	584.7	28	Did not advance	
Gabriel Chambi	50 m rifle three positions	1084	25	Did not advance	
Henry Aviles Arroyo	Trap	106	24	Did not advance	
César Menacho	Trap	99	=26	Did not advance	

Women

Athlete	Event	Qualification		Final	
Athlete	Event	Points	Rank	Points	Rank
Selenia Ledezma	10 m air rifle	595.0	22	Did not advance	
Madeleine Velasco	Trap	86	14	Did not advance	

Mixed

Athlete	Event	Qualification		Final	
Athlete	Event	Points	Rank	Points	Rank
Gabriel Chambi; Selenia Ledezma	10 metre air rifle	783.2	22	Did not advance	
César Menacho; Madeleine Velasco	Trap	110	13	Did not advance	

== Swimming ==
Bolivia qualified four swimmers (three men and one woman).

Key

- Note – Ranks given are for the entire round
- QA – Qualified for Final A
- QB – Qualified for Final B

Athlete	Event	Heat		Final	
Athlete	Event	Time	Rank	Time	Rank
José Alberto Quintanilla	Men's 50 m freestyle	23.89	24	Did not advance	
Gabriel Castillo Sulca	Men's 100 m backstroke	1:00.12	22	Did not advance	
Santiago Cavanagh	Men's 100 m breaststroke	1:04.71	20	Did not advance	
Karen Torrez	Women's 50 m freestyle	25.72	5 QA	25.56	6
Karen Torrez	Women's 100 m freestyle	57.19	8 QA	56.59	6
Karen Torrez	Women's 100 m butterfly	1:01.73	10 QB	1:01.80	11

== Tennis ==
Bolivia qualified three tennis players (two men and one woman).

Athlete	Event	First round	Round of 32	Round of 16	Quarterfinals	Semifinals	Final / BM	
Athlete	Event	Opposition Score	Opposition Score	Opposition Score	Opposition Score	Opposition Score	Opposition Score	Rank
Boris Arias	Men's singles	Bye	Varillas (PER); L 1–6, 1–6	Did not advance				
Federico Zeballos	Men's singles	Turcios (HON); W 6–3, 4–6, 6–1	Redlicki (USA); L 2–6, 0–6	Did not advance				
Noelia Zeballos	Women's singles	—N/a	Vagramov (CAN); L 6–3, 4–6, 3–6	Did not advance				
Boris Arias; Federico Zeballos	Men's doubles	—N/a	Bye	Hernández / Fierros (MEX); W 6–1, 6–2	Subervi / Burgos (DOM); W 6–2, 6–7, [10–2]	Escobar / Quiroz (ECU); L 3–6, 4–6	Galdós / Varillas (PER); L 3–6, 6–3, [10–12]	4
Federico Zeballos; Noelia Zeballos	Mixed doubles	—N/a		Bye	Sánchez / Olmos (MEX); W 6–2, 2–6, [10–5]	Galdós / Iamachkine (PER); W 1–6, 6–4, [10–2]	Jarry / Guarachi (CHI); L 1–6, 3–6	2nd place, silver medalist(s)

== Triathlon ==
Bolivia received one wild card in the men's individual competition. Madde became the first Bolivian to finish the competition, as all previous representatives were unable too.

Men

Athlete	Event	Swim (1.5 km)	Trans 1	Bike (40 km)	Trans 2	Run (8.88 km)	Total	Rank
Alejandro Madde	Individual	19:49	1:08	1:30:0	0:29	38:55	2:09:26	28
