= Bolivia at the 2015 Pan American Games =

- IOC code: BOL
- NOC: Comité Olímpico Boliviano
- Website: www.cobol.org.bo

in Toronto, Canada 10–26 July 2015
- Competitors: 34 in 12 sports
- Flag bearer (opening): Rudolf Knijnenburg
- Flag bearer (closing): Conrrado Moscoso
- Medals Ranked =20th: Gold 0 Silver 1 Bronze 2 Total 3

Pan American Games appearances (overview)
- 1967; 1971; 1975; 1979; 1983; 1987; 1991; 1995; 1999; 2003; 2007; 2011; 2015; 2019; 2023; 2027

Bolivia competed at the 2015 Pan American Games in Toronto, Canada from July 10 to 26, 2015.

Sport shooter Rudolf Knijnenburg was the flagbearer for the team during the opening ceremony.

== Competitors ==
The following table lists Bolivia's delegation per sport and gender.

Sport	Men	Women	Total
Athletics	1	3	4
Boxing	0	1	1
Cycling	2	0	2
Golf	2	2	4
Gymnastics	1	1	2
Racquetball	3	3	6
Shooting	5	1	6
Swimming	1	1	2
Tennis	3	1	4
Triathlon	1	0	1
Weightlifting	1	0	1
Wrestling	1	0	1
Total	21	13	34

== Medalists ==
The following competitors from Bolivia won medals at the games. In the by discipline sections below, medalists' names are bolded.

Medal	Name	Sport	Event	Date
Silver	Roland Keller; Conrrado Moscoso	Racquetball	Men's doubles	July 24
Bronze	Conrrado Moscoso	Racquetball	Men's singles	July 23
Bronze	Carlos Keller; Roland Keller; Conrrado Moscoso	Racquetball	Men's Team	July 25

**Medals by sport**
**Sport**	1st place, gold medalist(s)	2nd place, silver medalist(s)	3rd place, bronze medalist(s)	**Total**
Racquetball	0	1	2	3
**Total**	**0**	**1**	**2**	**3**

**Medals by day**
**Day**	1st place, gold medalist(s)	2nd place, silver medalist(s)	3rd place, bronze medalist(s)	**Total**
July 23	0	0	1	1
July 24	0	1	0	1
July 25	0	0	1	1
**Total**	**0**	**1**	**2**	**3**

**Medals by gender**
**Gender**	1st place, gold medalist(s)	2nd place, silver medalist(s)	3rd place, bronze medalist(s)	**Total**
Male	0	1	2	3
Female	0	0	0	0
**Total**	**0**	**1**	**2**	**3**

**Multiple medalists**
**Name**	**Sport**	1st place, gold medalist(s)	2nd place, silver medalist(s)	3rd place, bronze medalist(s)	**Total**
Roland Keller	Racquetball	0	1	1	2
Conrado Moscoso	Racquetball	0	1	2	3

== Athletics ==
Bolivia qualified four athletes (one man and three women).

Key

- Note–Ranks given for track events are for the entire round
- **DQ** = Disqualified
- N/A = Round not applicable for the event

Track and road events

Athlete	Event	Final	
Athlete	Event	Result	Rank
Marco Antonio Rodríguez	Men's 20 km walk	1:26:59	6
Rosmery Quispe	Women's 10,000 m	35:03.35	13
Claudia Balderrama	Women's 20 m walk	**DQ**	
Wendy Cornejo	Women's 20 m walk	1:36:58	9

== Boxing ==
Bolivia qualified one female boxer.

Women

Athlete	Event	Preliminaries	Quarterfinals	Semifinals	Final
Athlete	Event	Opposition Result	Opposition Result	Opposition Result	Opposition Result
Nadia Barriga Villarroel	Flyweight	Valencia Victoria (COL); **L** 0–3	Did not advance		

== Cycling ==
Bolivia qualified two male BMX cyclists.

Key

- Note – Ranks given for cycling events are for all heats
- **Q** = Qualified for the next round

=== BMX ===
Men

Athlete	Event	Qualifying		Time Trial Super-Final		Quarterfinal		Semifinal		Final	
Athlete	Event	Result	Rank	Result	Rank	Points	Rank	Result	Rank	Points	Rank
Jaime Quintanilla Cuenca	Individual	39.460	16 **Q**	39.368	13	11	= 12	47.343	14	Did not advance	
Esteban Yaffar	Individual	39.520	17	Did not advance		13	= 15 **Q**	44.820	11	Did not advance	

== Golf ==
Bolivia qualified a team of four athletes (two men and two women).

Athlete(s)	Event	Final					
Athlete(s)	Event	Round 1	Round 2	Round 3	Round 4	Total	Rank
José Luis Montaño	Men's individual	70	72	75	73	290	=13
George Scanlon	Men's individual	84	74	69	79	306	29
Natalia Perez	Women's individual	77	83	79	79	318	=22
Natalia Soria	Women's individual	84	80	86	79	329	25
José Luis Montaño; Natalia Perez; George Scanlon; Natalia Soria	Mixed team	147	152	148	152	599	10

== Gymnastics ==
Bolivia qualified two gymnasts (one male and one female).

Key

- **Q** = Qualified for the next round

=== Artistic ===
Men

Bolivia qualified one male artistic gymnast.

Athlete	Event	Qualification								Final							
Athlete	Event	Apparatus						Total	Rank	Apparatus						Total	Rank
Athlete	Event	F	PH	R	V	PB	HB	Total	Rank	F	PH	R	V	PB	HB	Total	Rank
Marco Riveros	All-Around	11.400	10.050	10.500	12.650	12.400	11.150	68.150	32 **Q**	11.550	4.150	9.750	12.550	12.100	10.250	60.350	24

Women

Bolivia qualified one female artistic gymnast.

Athlete	Event	Qualification						Final					
Athlete	Event	Apparatus				Total	Rank	Apparatus				Total	Rank
Athlete	Event	F	V	UB	BB	Total	Rank	F	V	UB	BB	Total	Rank
Kaylee Cole	All-Around	—N/a	12.400	10.900	—N/a	23.300	53	Did not advance					

== Racquetball ==
Bolivia qualified a team of three men and three women for a total of six athletes.

Men

Athlete	Event	Pool play				Round of 32	Round of 16	Quarterfinals	Semifinals	Final	
Athlete	Event	Opposition Result	Opposition Result	Opposition Result	Points	Opposition Result	Opposition Result	Opposition Result	Opposition Result	Opposition Result	Rank
Carlos Keller	Singles	Rios (ECU); **L** (13–15, 13–15)	Galicia (GUA); **W** (15–5, 15–3)	Acuña (CRC); **W** (15–9, 15–2)	5	Bye	Green (CAN); **W** (11–15, 15–6, 11–0)	Moscoso (BOL); **L** (3–15, 5–15)	Did not advance		
**Conrrado Moscoso**	Singles	De la Rosa (MEX); **L** (8–15, 5–15)	Wer (GUA); **W** (15–10, 15–3)	Iwaasa (CAN); **W** (15–11, 15–6)	5	Bye	Camacho (CRC); **W** (15–11, 15–9)	Keller (BOL); **W** (15–3, 15–5)	Beltrán (MEX); **L** (9–15, 3–15)	Did not advance	3rd place, bronze medalist(s)
**Roland Keller**; **Conrrado Moscoso**	Doubles	Galicia / Wer (GUA); **W** (15–7, 15–3)	De Leon / Perez (DOM); **W** (15–9, 15–12)	Castillo / Castro (ECU); **W** (15–7, 15–9)	6	—N/a	Bye	Franco / Herrera (COL); **W** (8–15, 15–9, 11–6)	Gagnon / Landeryou (CAN); **W** (15–11, 15–9)	Allen / Rojas (USA); **L** (8–15, 5–15)	2nd place, silver medalist(s)
**Carlos Keller**; **Roland Keller**; **Conrrado Moscoso**	Team	—N/a					Bye	Cubillos / Franco / Herrera (COL); **W** (2–0, 2–1)	Beltrán / De la Rosa / Moreno (MEX); **L** (0–2, 2–1, 1–2)	Did not advance	3rd place, bronze medalist(s)

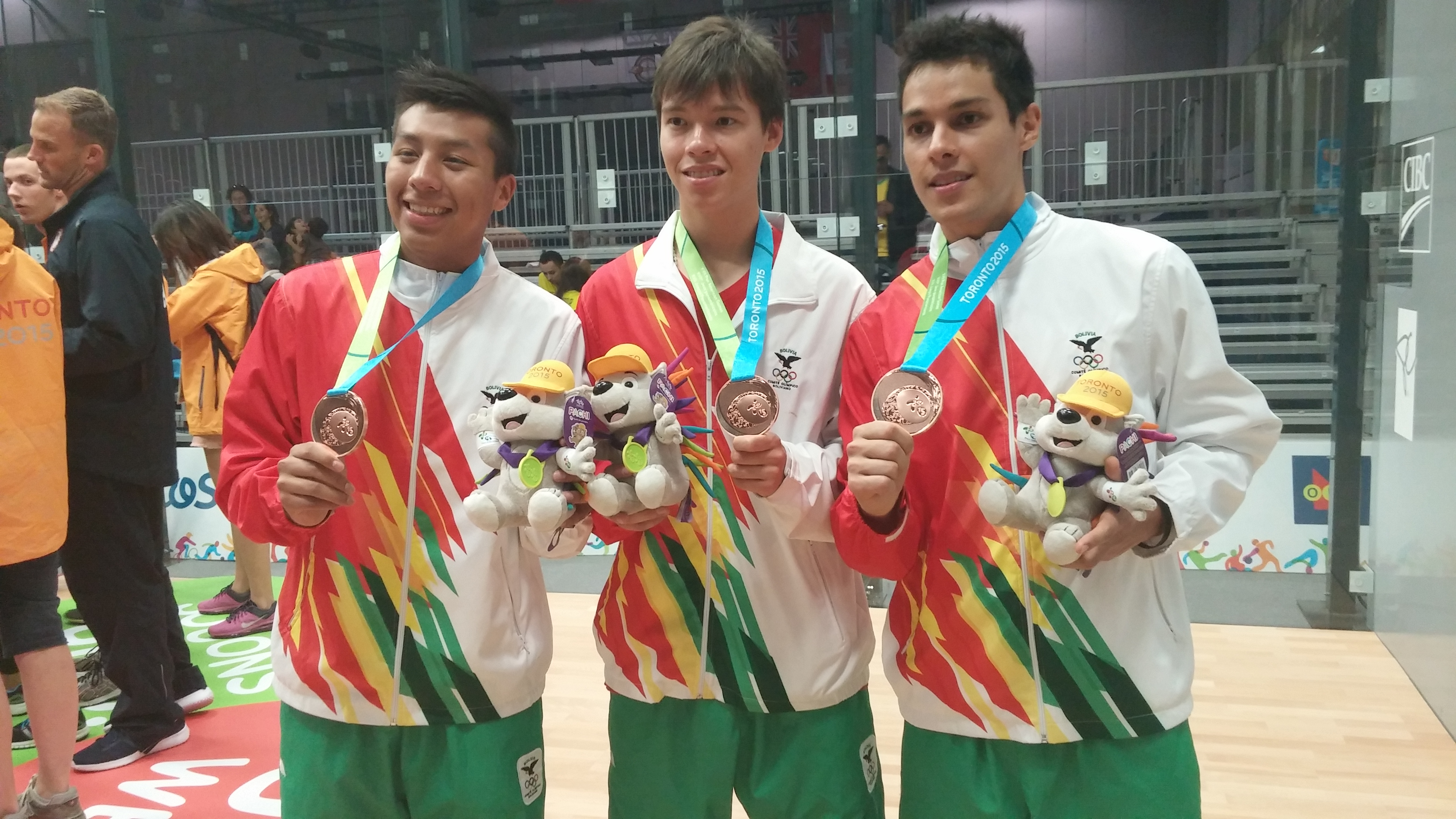
Bolivia's bronze medal-winning men's team

Women

Athlete	Event	Pool play				Round of 32	Round of 16	Quarterfinals	Semifinals	Final	
Athlete	Event	Opposition Result	Opposition Result	Opposition Result	Points	Opposition Result	Opposition Result	Opposition Result	Opposition Result	Opposition Result	Rank
Carola Loma	Singles	Muñoz (CHI); **W** (6–15, 15–8, 11–6)	Rajsich (USA); **L** (7–15, 7–15)	Veronique Guillemette (ARG); WO	5	Bye	Saunders (CAN); **W** (15–9, 15–1)	Longoria (MEX); **L** (15–1, 15–2)	Did not advance		
Adriana Riveros	Singles	Martinez (GUA); **W** (6–15, 15–11, 11–5)	Key (USA); **W** (13–15, 15–11, 11–8)	Salas (MEX); L' (15–3, 15–1)	5	Bye	Amaya (COL); **L** (15–5, 15–2)	Did not advance			
Carola Loma; Natalia Mendez	Doubles	Amaya / Gomez (COL); **L** (15–14, 11–15, 10–11)	Paredes / Tobon (VEN); **L** (15–8, 14–15, 3–11)	Morisette / Richardson (CAN); **W** (15–10, 15–11)	4	—N/a	Martinez / Rodriguez (GUA); **W** (15–10, 11–15, 11–5)	Longoria / Salas (MEX); **L** (9–15, 0–15)	Did not advance		
Carola Loma; Natalia Mendez; Adriana Riveros	Team	—N/a					Bye	Muñoz / Sotomayor (ECU); **L** (0–2, 0–2)	Did not advance		

== Shooting ==
Bolivia qualified six shooters.

Men

Athlete	Event	Qualification		Final	
Athlete	Event	Points	Rank	Points	Rank
Rudolf Knijnenburg	10 m air pistol	562	17	Did not advance	
Diego Cossio Quiroga	25 m rapid fire pistol	285	9 **Q**	552	10
Rudolf Knijnenburg	50 m pistol	547	3 **Q**	107.8	6
Cristian Morales Bustos	10 m air rifle	605.7	16	Did not advance	
Cristian Morales Bustos	50 m rifle prone	609.2	19	Did not advance	

Match shooting

Athlete	Event	Qualification		Semifinal		Final / BM	
Athlete	Event	Points	Rank	Points	Rank	Opposition Result	Rank
Marcelo Arana Urioste	Trap	78	27	Did not advance			
César Menacho	Trap	98	21	Did not advance			

Women

Athlete	Event	Qualification		Final	
Athlete	Event	Points	Rank	Points	Rank
Ana Karina Garcia	10 m air rifle	401.7	19	Did not advance	
Ana Karina Garcia	50 m rifle 3 position	548	25	Did not advance	

== Swimming ==
Bolivia received two universality spots (one male and one female).

Athlete	Event	Heat		Final	
Athlete	Event	Time	Rank	Time	Rank
Aldo Castillo Sulca	Men's 100m butterfly	57.25	17 **FB**	56.97	15
Aldo Castillo Sulca	Men's 200m butterfly	2:12.77	17	Did not advance	
Aldo Castillo Sulca	Men's 400m individual medley	4:58.57	19	Did not advance	
Karen Torrez	Women's 50m freestyle	26.01	13 **FB**	26.12	14
Karen Torrez	Women's 100m freestyle	57.49	17 **FB**	57.79	15

== Tennis ==
Men

Athlete	Event	Round of 64	Round of 32	Round of 16	Quarterfinals	Semifinals	Final / BM	
Athlete	Event	Opposition Score	Opposition Score	Opposition Score	Opposition Score	Opposition Score	Opposition Score	Rank
Rodrigo Banzer	Singles	Salamanca (COL); **W** (3–6, 6–3, 6–2)	Andreozzi (ARG); **L** (1–6, 2–6)	Did not advance				
Hugo Dellien	Singles	Bye	Gonzalez (GUA); **W** (7–6, 0–6, 6–1)	Nicolás Barrientos (COL); **L** (1–6, 6–3, 1–6)	Did not advance			
Federico Zeballos	Singles	Austin (USA); **L** (1–6, 2–6)	Did not advance					
Rodrigo Banzer; Federico Zeballos	Doubles	—N/a		Obando / Turcios (HON); **W** (6–1, 7–5)	Escobar / Gómez Estrada (ECU); **L** (6–7, 4–6)	Did not advance		

Women

Athlete	Event	Round of 32	Round of 16	Quarterfinals	Semifinals	Final / BM	
Athlete	Event	Opposition Score	Opposition Score	Opposition Score	Opposition Score	Opposition Score	Rank
Maria Alvarez	Singles	Segarelli (DOM); **W** (3–6, 6–2, 7–6)	Victoria Rodríguez (MEX); **L** (3–6, 2–6)	Did not advance			

Mixed

Athlete	Event	Round of 16	Quarterfinals	Semifinals	Final / BM	
Athlete	Event	Opposition Score	Opposition Score	Opposition Score	Opposition Score	Rank
Maria Alvarez; Hugo Dellien	Doubles	Diaz Figueroa / Weedon (GUA); **W** (4–6, 6–3, 11–9)	Andreozzi / María Irigoyen (ARG); **L** (0–6, 4–6)	Did not advance		

== Triathlon ==
Bolivia received a wildcard to enter one male triathlete.

Men

Athlete	Event	Swim (1.5 km)	Trans 1	Bike (40 km)	Trans 2	Run (10 km)	Total	Rank
Alvaro Santos Ipabary	Individual	22:09	0:23	Lapped				

== Weightlifting ==
Bolivia received a wildcard.

Athlete	Event	Snatch		Clean & jerk		Total	Rank
Athlete	Event	Result	Rank	Result	Rank	Total	Rank
Neyer Saldias	Men's 69kg	112	11	125	12	237	12

== Wrestling ==
Bolivia received one wildcard.

Greco-Roman

Athlete	Event	Quarterfinals	Semifinals	Final
Athlete	Event	Opposition Result	Opposition Result	Opposition Result
Marvin Chávez	59 kg	Torres (CHI); **L** 0–8 ^{PO}	Did not advance	

== See also ==
- Bolivia at the 2016 Summer Olympics
