= Racquetball at the 1995 Pan American Games =

This page shows the results of the Racquetball Competition for men and women at the 1995 Pan American Games, held from March 11 to March 26, 1995 in Mar del Plata, Argentina. Racquetball made its debut at this edition of the Pan Am Games.

== Men's competition ==
=== Singles ===
RANK	NAME
Gold medal	John Ellis (USA)
Silver medal	Michael Bronfeld (USA)
Bronze medal	Sherman Greenfeld (CAN)

=== Doubles ===
RANK	NAME
Gold medal	United States; Sudsy Monchik; Tim Sweeney
Silver medal	Canada; Chris Brumwell; Jacques Demers
Bronze medal	Venezuela; Fabian Balmori; Jorge Hirsekorn

=== Teams ===
RANK	NAME
Gold medal	United States
Silver medal	Canada
Bronze medal	Venezuela

== Women's competition ==
=== Singles ===
RANK	NAME
Gold medal	Michelle Gould (USA)
Silver medal	Cheryl Gudinas (USA)
Bronze medal	Carol McFetridge (CAN)

=== Doubles ===
RANK	NAME
Gold medal	United States; Joy MacKenzie; Jackie Paraiso
Silver medal	Canada; Vicky Brown-Shanks; Deborah Ward
Bronze medal	Mexico; Guadalupe Torres; Rosy Torres

=== Teams ===
RANK	NAME
Gold medal	United States
Silver medal	Canada
Bronze medal	Mexico

== Medal table ==
Place	Nation	Gold medal	Silver medal	Bronze medal	Total
1	United States	6	2	0	8
2	Canada	0	4	2	6
3	Mexico	0	0	2	2
3	Venezuela	0	0	2	2
Total		6	6	6	18
