= Bolivia at the 2011 Pan American Games =

- IOC code: BOL
- NOC: Comité Olímpico Boliviano
- Website: www.cobol.org.bo

in Guadalajara 14–30 October 2011
- Competitors: 35 in 11 sports
- Flag bearer: Ricardo Monroy
- Medals Ranked 24th: Gold 0 Silver 0 Bronze 2 Total 2

Pan American Games appearances (overview)
- 1967; 1971; 1975; 1979; 1983; 1987; 1991; 1995; 1999; 2003; 2007; 2011; 2015; 2019; 2023

Bolivia competed at the 2011 Pan American Games in Guadalajara, Mexico from October 14 to 30, 2011. Bolivia's team consisted of thirty-four athletes in ten sports which is nineteen less athletes from the 2007 Pan American Games. Bolivia's wrestling, table tennis, beach volleyball, judo, and fencing teams all failed to qualify for the 2011 Games.

== Medalists ==
Medal	Name	Sport	Event	Date
Bronze	Maria Vargas	Racquetball	Women's singles	October 22
Bronze	Bolivia	Racquetball	Women's team	October 24

== Athletics ==
Bolivia qualified eight athletes.

Men

Athlete	Event	Final	
Athlete	Event	Result	Rank
Franklin Aduviri	Marathon	2:33:49	16th
Ausberto Lucas	Marathon	2:31:30	14th
Ronal Quispe	20 km walk	1:27:54	10th
Aldo Gonzalez	Shot put	17.06 m.	12th

Women

Athlete	Event	Final	
Athlete	Event	Result	Rank
Daisy Cecilia Ugarte	800 m	2:16.94	9th
Hilaria Patzy	3000 m steeplechase	11:56.42	11th
Geovana Irusta	20 km walk	1:41:43 PB	10th
Claudia Valderrama	20 km walk	1:37:32 PB	7th
Bianca Pereira	Marathon	DNF	

== Bowling ==
Bolivia qualified a pair of male bowlers to compete in the singles and pairs competitions.

Men

Individual

Athlete	Event	Qualification															Eighth Finals	Quarterfinals	Semifinals	Finals	
Athlete	Event	Block 1 (Games 1–6)						Block 2 (Games 7–12)						Total	Average	Rank	Eighth Finals	Quarterfinals	Semifinals	Finals	
Athlete	Event	1	2	3	4	5	6	7	8	9	10	11	12	Total	Average	Rank	Opposition Scores	Opposition Scores	Opposition Scores	Opposition Scores	Rank
Sebastian Nemtala	Men's individual	211	212	169	205	205	190	122	188	175	200	180	186	2243	186.9	25th	Did not advance				
Ignacio Rojas	Men's individual	157	187	181	168	186	174	131	201	185	181	197	199	2147	178.9	30th	Did not advance				

Pairs

Athlete	Event	Block 1 (Games 1–6)								Block 2 (Games 7–12)								Grand total	Final Rank
Athlete	Event	1	2	3	4	5	6	Total	Average	7	8	9	10	11	12	Total	Average	Grand total	Final Rank
Sebastian Nemtala; Ignacio Rojas	Men's pairs	233	141	168	226	148	205	1121	186.8	178	169	191	167	175	154	2155	179.6	4325	15th
Sebastian Nemtala; Ignacio Rojas	Men's pairs	192	182	200	146	193	172	1085	180.8	155	171	201	190	154	214	2170	180.8	4325	15th

== Cycling ==
=== BMX ===
Bolivia qualified two male BMX cyclists.

Men

Athlete	Qualification								Semifinals		Final	
Athlete	Race 1		Race 2		Race 3		Total Points	Qual. Rank	Time	Rank	Time	Rank
Athlete	Time	Points	Time	Points	Time	Points	Total Points	Qual. Rank	Time	Rank	Time	Rank
Leonardo Bonilla	50.113	6	43.117	5	39.567	5	16	15th	Did not advance			
Sebastian Vargas	40.909	5	37.872	4	40.235	6	15	16th	Did not advance			

=== Road ===
Bolivia qualified one female athlete to compete in the road cycling competition.

Women

Athlete	Event	Time	Rank
Valeria Escobar	Road race	2:25:10	33rd

== Racquetball ==
Bolivia qualified three male and three female racquetball athletes.

Men

Athlete	Event	Preliminary Round (2 or 3)	Round of 16	Quarterfinals	Semifinals	Final	
Athlete	Event	Opposition Score	Opposition Score	Opposition Score	Opposition Score	Opposition Score	Rank
Carlos Keller	Singles	Teobaldo Fumero (CRC); W 15–14, 15–7; Luis A. Pérez (DOM); W 15–4, 15–6; Michael Green (CAN); W 15–10, 4–15, 11–6	Alex Ackerman (USA); W 15–7, 15–6	Ro Carson III (USA); L 11–15, 0–15	Did not advance		
Ricardo Monroy	Singles	Felipe Camacho (CRC); W 15–6, 15–8; José Ugalde (ECU); W 15–7, 15–6; Ro Carson III (USA); L 12–15, 7–15	Juan Herrera (COL); L 13–15, 7–15	Did not advance			
Ricardo Monroy; Carlos Keller	Doubles	Christopher Crowther (United States) Shane Vanderson (USA); L 7–15, 13–15; Francisco Gómez (Colombia) Juan Torres (COL); L 7–15, 15-6, 3–11; Felipe Camacho (Cuba) Teobaldo Fumero (CUB); L 15-9, 12–15, 6–11	José Álvarez (Ecuador) Fernando Ríos (ECU); W 15-14, 15-8	Thimoty Landeryou (Canada) Kristofer Odegar (CAN); L 15-3, 10–15, 8–11	Did not advance		
Carlos Keller; Roland Keller; Ricardo Monroy	Team		Honduras; W 2–0, 2–0	United States; L 0-2, 0-2	Did not advance		

Women

Athlete	Event	Preliminary Round (2 or 3)	Round of 16	Quarterfinals	Semifinals	Final	
Athlete	Event	Opposition Score	Opposition Score	Opposition Score	Opposition Score	Opposition Score	Rank
Jenny Daza	Singles	Ishley Paredes (VEN); W 15–13, 15–11; Veronique Guillemete (ARG); W 15–14, 15–10; Jennifer Saunders (CAN); L 13–15, 2–15	Carla Muñoz (CHI); W 15–1, 15–1	María Vargas (BOL); L 6–15, 13–15	Did not advance		
María Vargas	Singles	Claudine García (DOM); L 10–15, 13–15; Marie Gomar (GUA); W 15–3, 15–8; Cheryl Gudinas (USA); L 2–15, 13–15	Federique Lambert (CAN); W 15–11, 15–8	Jenny Daza (BOL); W 15–6, 15–13	Rhonda Rajsich (USA); L 6–15, 7–15; Bronze	Did not advance	
Jenny Daza; Cintia Loma	Doubles	Veronique Guillemete (Argentina) Dafne Macrino (ARG); W 15–4, 15–9; Josée Grand'Maitre (Canada) Brandi Jacobson (CAN); W 15–4, 15–4		María Córdova (Ecuador) María Muñoz (ECU); L 10–15, 15-2, 7–11	Did not advance		
Jenny Daza; Cintia Loma; María Vargas	Team			Chile; W 2–0, 2–0	United States; L 0-2, 0-2; Bronze	Did not advance	

== Shooting ==
Bolivia qualified six shooters.

Men

Athlete	Event	Qualification		Final	
Athlete	Event	Score	Rank	Score	Rank
Cristian Morales	50 m rifle prone	577-20x	20th	Did not advance	
Cristian Morales	10 m rifle air rifle	581-35x	13th	Did not advance	
Rudolf Knijnenburg	50 m pistol	530- 6x	19th	Did not advance	
Rudolf Knijnenburg	10 m air pistol	571-15x	8th	669.7	7th
Cesar Menacho	Trap	109	20th	Did not advance	
Juan Carlos Pérez	Trap	118	7th	Did not advance	

Women

Athlete	Event	Qualification		Final	
Athlete	Event	Score	Rank	Score	Rank
Wendy Palomeque	50 m rifle prone three positions	538- 6x	24th	Did not advance	
Wendy Palomeque	10 m rifle air rifle	381-17x	24th	Did not advance	
Carina Garcia	10 m rifle air rifle	384-17x	17th	Did not advance	

== Swimming ==
Bolivia qualified two swimmers.

Women

Athlete	Event	Heats		Final	
Athlete	Event	Time	Rank	Time	Rank
Karen Torrez	50 m freestyle	27.24	16th	Did not advance	
Karen Torrez	100 m freestyle	58.81	13th	Did not advance	
Karen Torrez	100 m butterfly	1:04.28	15th	Did not advance	
Mariana Zavalla	100 m backstroke	2:28.30	17th	Did not advance	

== Taekwondo ==
Bolivia received a wildcard to send one female taekwondo athlete.

Women

Athlete	Event	Round of 16	Quarterfinals	Semifinals	Final
Athlete	Event	Opposition Result	Opposition Result	Opposition Result	Opposition Result
Andrea Franco	Flyweight (-49kg)	Johanys Tejada (PUR); L 1 - 9	Did not advance		

== Tennis ==
Bolivia qualified four tennis players (two male and two female).

Men

Athlete	Event	1st Round	2nd Round	Round of 16	Quarterfinals	Semifinals	Final	
Athlete	Event	Opposition Score	Opposition Score	Opposition Score	Opposition Score	Opposition Score	Opposition Score	Rank
Mauricio Doria-Medina	Singles	Ariel Behar (URU); W 7- 6 (5), 6 - 4	Robert Farah (COL); L 2 - 6, 1 - 6	Did not advance				
Federico Zeballos	Singles	César Ramirez (MEX); L 4 - 6, 2 - 6	Did not advance					
Mauricio Doria-Medina; Federico Zeballos	Doubles			Jorge Aguilar (CHI); Nicolás Massú (CHI); L 1 - 6, 5 - 7	Did not advance			

Women

Athlete	Event	1st Round	Round of 16	Quarterfinals	Semifinals	Final	
Athlete	Event	Opposition Score	Opposition Score	Opposition Score	Opposition Score	Opposition Score	Rank
María Fernanda Álvarez Terán	Singles	Valeria Pulido (MEX); W 6- 4, 7 - 5	Jessica Roland (PUR); L 4 - 6, 3 - 6	Did not advance			
Noelia Zeballos	Singles	Mariana Duque (COL); L 3 - 6, 2 - 6	Did not advance				
Mauricio Doria-Medina; Federico Zeballos	Doubles			María Irigoyen (ARG); Florencia Molinero (ARG); L 5 - 7, 4 - 6	Did not advance		

== Triathlon ==
Bolivia has received an invitational spot to send a male triathlete.

Men

Athlete	Event	Swim (1.5 km)	Trans 1	Bike (40 km)	Trans 2	Run (10 km)	Total	Rank
Jose Raul Espinoza	Individual	Did not finish						
