= Racquetball at the 1999 Pan American Games =

This page shows the results of the Racquetball Competition for men and women at the 1999 Pan American Games, held from July 23 to August 8, 1999 in Winnipeg, Manitoba, Canada.

== Men's competition ==
=== Singles ===
RANK	NAME
Gold medal	Adam Karp (USA)
Silver medal	Michael Bronfeld (USA)
Bronze medal	Rod de Jesús (PUR)

=== Doubles ===
RANK	NAME
Gold medal	United States; Douglas Ganim; Douglas Kachtik
Silver medal	Canada; Roger Harripersad; Kelly Kerr
Bronze medal	Mexico; Alvaro Beltrán; Javier Moreno

== Women's competition ==
=== Singles ===
RANK	NAME
Gold medal	Cheryl Gudinas (USA)
Silver medal	Christie van Hees (CAN)
Bronze medal	Laura Fenton (USA)

=== Doubles ===
RANK	NAME
Gold medal	United States; Joy MacKenzie; Jackie Paraiso
Silver medal	Canada; Lori-Jane Powell; Deborah Ward
Bronze medal	Chile; Angela Grisar; Loreto Barriga

== Medal table ==
Place	Nation	Gold medal	Silver medal	Bronze medal	Total
1	United States	4	1	1	6
2	Canada	0	3	0	3
3	Chile	0	0	1	1
3	Mexico	0	0	1	1
3	Puerto Rico	0	0	1	1
Total		4	4	4	12
