= Racquetball at the 2019 Pan American Games =

- Racquetball pictogram
- Venue: Racquetball Courts
- Dates: August 2–10, 2019
- Competitors: 60 from 14 nations

Racquetball competitions at the 2019 Pan American Games in Lima, Peru is being held between August 2 and 10, 2019 at the Racquetball courts located at the Villa Deportiva Regional del Callao cluster.

Six medal events were contested, a singles, doubles and team events for both men and women. A total of 60 athletes qualified to compete at the games.

== Medal table ==
* Host nation (Peru)

Rank	Nation	Gold	Silver	Bronze	Total
1	Mexico	5	1	1	7
2	Bolivia	1	1	2	4
3	Argentina	0	2	2	4
4	Colombia	0	1	2	3
5	Guatemala	0	1	0	1
6	United States	0	0	4	4
7	Costa Rica	0	0	1	1
Totals (7 entries)		6	6	12	24

== Medalists ==
=== Men's events ===
Event	Gold	Silver	Bronze
Men's singles	Rodrigo Montoya; Mexico	Álvaro Beltrán; Mexico	Conrrado Moscoso; Bolivia
Men's singles	Rodrigo Montoya; Mexico	Álvaro Beltrán; Mexico	Mario Mercado; Colombia
Men's doubles	Mexico; Javier Mar; Rodrigo Montoya	Bolivia; Conrrado Moscoso; Roland Keller	United States; Rocky Carson; Charles Pratt
Men's doubles	Mexico; Javier Mar; Rodrigo Montoya	Bolivia; Conrrado Moscoso; Roland Keller	Costa Rica; Andrés Acuña; Felipe Camacho
Men's team	Bolivia; Carlos Keller; Conrrado Moscoso; Roland Keller	Colombia; Sebastian Franco; Mario Mercado	United States; Jake Bredenbeck; Rocky Carson; Charles Pratt
Men's team	Bolivia; Carlos Keller; Conrrado Moscoso; Roland Keller	Colombia; Sebastian Franco; Mario Mercado	Mexico; Álvaro Beltrán; Javier Mar; Rodrigo Montoya

=== Women's events ===
Event	Gold	Silver	Bronze
Women's singles	Paola Longoria; Mexico	María José Vargas; Argentina	Natalia Méndez; Argentina
Women's singles	Paola Longoria; Mexico	María José Vargas; Argentina	Adriana Riveros; Colombia
Women's doubles	Mexico; Paola Longoria; Samantha Salas	Guatemala; Gabriela Martínez; María Rodríguez	United States; Kelani Lawrence; Rhonda Rajsich
Women's doubles	Mexico; Paola Longoria; Samantha Salas	Guatemala; Gabriela Martínez; María Rodríguez	Argentina; Natalia Méndez; María José Vargas
Women's team	Mexico; Paola Longoria; Montserrat Mejía; Samantha Salas	Argentina; Natalia Méndez; María José Vargas	United States; Kelani Lawrence; Rhonda Rajsich
Women's team	Mexico; Paola Longoria; Montserrat Mejía; Samantha Salas	Argentina; Natalia Méndez; María José Vargas	Bolivia; Angélica Barrios; Valeria Centellas; Jenny Daza

== Participating nations ==
A total of 14 countries qualified athletes. The number of athletes a nation entered is in parentheses beside the name of the country.

- Argentina (5)
- Bolivia (7)
- Canada (4)
- Chile (3)
- Colombia (5)
- Costa Rica (3)
- Cuba (4)
- Dominican Republic (4)
- Ecuador (4)
- Guatemala (4)
- Mexico (7)
- Peru (3)
- United States (5)
- Venezuela (2)

== Qualification ==
A total of 60 racquetball athletes qualified compete. Each nation may enter a maximum of 8 athletes (four per gender). In each gender there will be a total of 30 athletes qualified, with the 2019 Pan American Championships being used to determine the countries qualified. Peru as host nation did not qualify any athletes automatically.
