= Bolivia at the Pan American Games =

- IOC code: BOL
- NOC: Comité Olímpico Boliviano
- Website: www.cobol.org.bo
- Medals Ranked 23rd: Gold 3 Silver 5 Bronze 10 Total 18

Pan American Games appearances (overview)
- 1967; 1971; 1975; 1979; 1983; 1987; 1991; 1995; 1999; 2003; 2007; 2011; 2015; 2019; 2023

Bolivia has competed at every edition of the Pan American Games since the fifth edition of the multi-sport event in 1967. The first Bolivian medal was a silver in the 1991 taekwondo tournament. Since then the country has won one gold medal, three silver medals, and eight bronze medals between 2003 and 2019. Aside from two silver medals in taekwondo and tennis, and a bronze in cycling, all the other medals came from racquetball. As of the last Pan American Games in 2023, Bolivia is twenty-third on the all time medals list. Bolivia competed in the first ever Pan American Winter Games in 1990, however it failed to medal.

The country won its first ever gold medal in 2019, and also had its best performance with a total of five medals won.

== Pan American Games ==
=== Medals by games ===
To sort the tables by host city, total medal count, or any other column, click on the icon next to the column title.

Year	Ref.	Edition	Host city	Rank	Gold	Silver	Bronze	Total
1951		I	(Argentina) Buenos Aires	Did not participate				
1955		II	Mexico City	Did not participate				
1959		III	(United States) Chicago	Did not participate				
1963		IV	(Brazil) São Paulo	Did not participate				
1967		V	(Canada) Winnipeg	—	0	0	0	0
1971		VI	(Colombia) Cali	—	0	0	0	0
1975		VII	Mexico City	—	0	0	0	0
1979		VIII	(Puerto Rico) San Juan	—	0	0	0	0
1983		IX	(Venezuela) Caracas	—	0	0	0	0
1987		X	(United States) Indianapolis	—	0	0	0	0
1991		XI	(Cuba) Havana	20th	0	1	0	1
1995		XII	(Argentina) Mar del Plata	—	0	0	0	0
1999		XIII	(Canada) Winnipeg	—	0	0	0	0
2003		XIV	(Dominican Republic) Santo Domingo	25th	0	0	2	2
2007		XV	(Brazil) Rio de Janeiro	—	0	0	0	0
2011		XVI	(Mexico) Guadalajara	24th	0	0	2	2
2015		XVII	(Canada) Toronto	22nd	0	1	2	3
2019		XVIII	(Peru) Lima	19th	1	2	2	5
2023		XIX	(Chile) Santiago	17th	2	1	2	5
Total				28th	3	5	10	18

=== Medals by sport ===
Sport	Gold	Silver	Bronze	Total
Racquetball	3	3	9	15
Taekwondo	0	1	0	1
Tennis	0	1	0	1
Cycling	0	0	1	1
Totals (4 entries)	3	5	10	18

== Winter Pan American Games ==
=== Medals by games ===
Year	Ref.	Edition	Host city	Rank	Gold	Silver	Bronze	Total
1990		I	(Argentina) Las Leñas	—	0	0	0	0
Total				—	0	0	0	0

== Junior Pan American Games ==
=== Medals by games ===
Year	Ref.	Edition	Host city	Rank	Gold	Silver	Bronze	Total
2021		I	(Colombia) Cali-Valle	19th	1	1	2	4
2025		II	(Paraguay) Asunción	Future event				
Total				19th	1	1	2	4
