= Bolivia at the 1991 Pan American Games =

- IOC code: BOL
- NOC: Comité Olímpico Boliviano
- Website: www.cobol.org.bo

in Havana 8–18 August 1991
- Medals Ranked 20th: Gold 0 Silver 1 Bronze 0 Total 1

Pan American Games appearances (overview)
- 1967; 1971; 1975; 1979; 1983; 1987; 1991; 1995; 1999; 2003; 2007; 2011; 2015; 2019; 2023

Bolivia participated at the 11th Pan American Games, held in Havana, Cuba from August 2 to August 18, 1991. Fighter William Arancibia won a silver medal at the Taekwondo competition, making it the first ever Bolivian medal at the competition.

== See also ==
- Bolivia at the 1992 Summer Olympics
