= Bolivia at the 2003 Pan American Games =

- IOC code: BOL
- NOC: Comité Olímpico Boliviano
- Website: web.archive.org/web/20141030221607/http://www.cobol.org.bo/

in Santo Domingo 1–17 August 2003
- Flag bearer: Giovanna Irustra
- Medals Ranked 25th: Gold 0 Silver 0 Bronze 2 Total 2

Pan American Games appearances (overview)
- 1967; 1971; 1975; 1979; 1983; 1987; 1991; 1995; 1999; 2003; 2007; 2011; 2015; 2019; 2023

The 14th Pan American Games were held in Santo Domingo, Dominican Republic from August 1 to August 17, 2003.

== Medals ==
=== Bronze ===
===== Cycling =====
- Men's Time Trial: Benjamín Martínez

===== Racquetball =====
- Women's doubles

== Results by event ==
=== Athletics ===
Track

Athlete	Event	Heat		Final	
Athlete	Event	Time	Rank	Time	Rank
Niusha Mancilla	Women's 1,500 m	—	—	DNF	—
Rosa Apaza	Women's 5,000 m	—	—	17:01.41	7

Road

Athlete	Event	Time	Rank
Geovana Irusta	Women's 20 km race walk	1:37:08	4
Ariana Quino	Women's 20 km race walk	1:38:43	5

=== Cycling ===
==== Mountain Bike ====
- Yamil Carlos Montaño
  - Men's Cross Country — + 1 lap (→ 6th place)

=== Triathlon ===
Athlete	Event	Race			Total	
Athlete	Event	Swim	Bike	Run	Time	Rank
Agnes Eppers	Women's Individual	26:58.500	—	—	DNF	—

== See also ==
- Bolivia at the 2004 Summer Olympics
