= Ricardo Chandeck =

Panamanian sports shooter

Personal information
- Nationality: Panamanian
- Born: 20 January 1973 (age 53) Panama City, Panama

Sport
- Sport: Sports shooting
Medal record
Representing Panama
Central American and Caribbean Games
Bronze medal – third place	2018 Barranquilla	10m air pistol team

Ricardo Chandeck (born 20 January 1973) is a Panamanian sports shooter. He competed in the men's 10 metre air pistol event at the 2000 Summer Olympics.
