= Daryl Szarenski =

American sports shooter

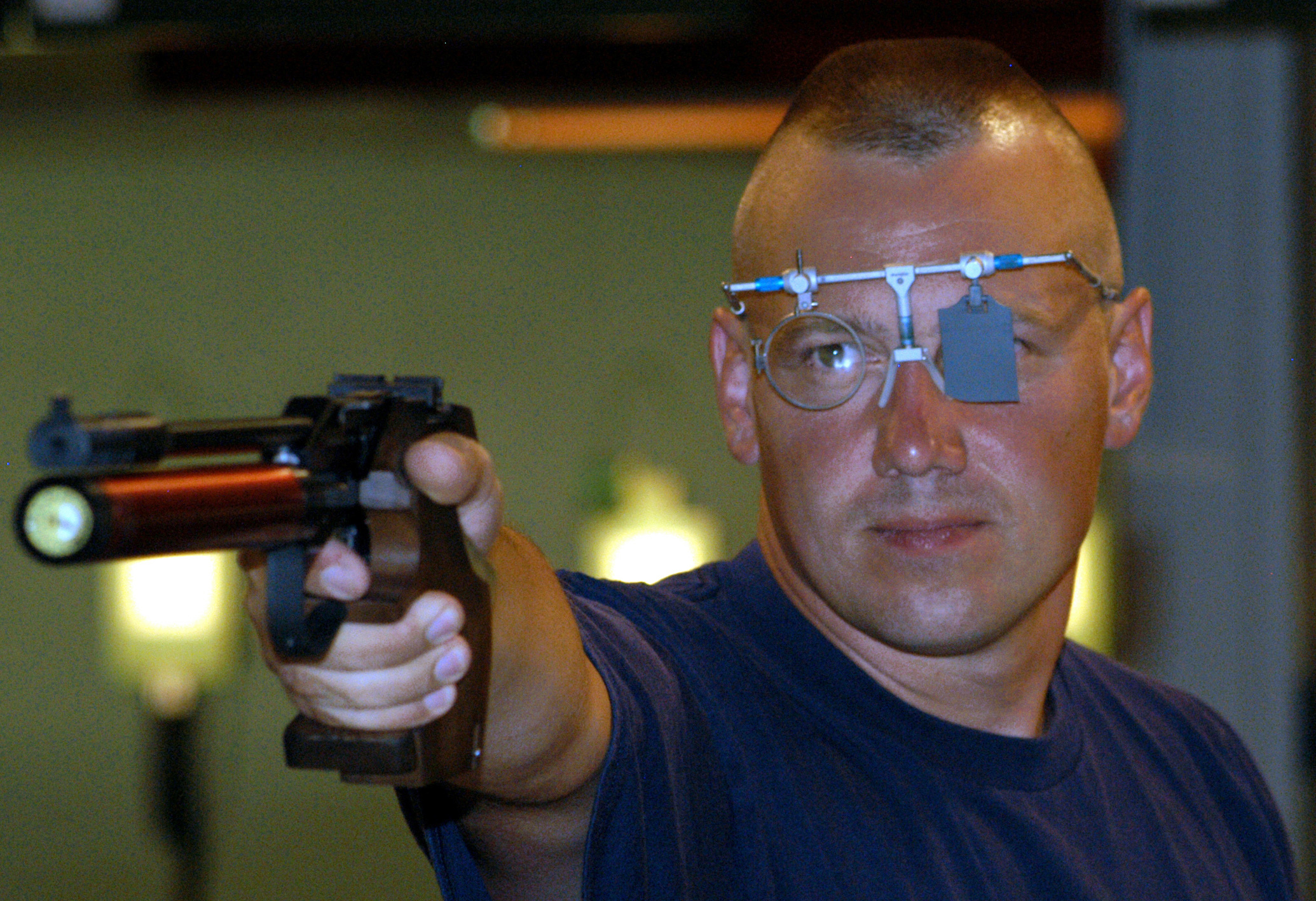
- Daryl Szarenski in 2011

Personal information
- Born: March 14, 1968 (age 58) Saginaw, Michigan, U.S.
- Height: 1.80 m (5 ft 11 in)
- Weight: 93 kg (205 lb)

Sport
- Sport: Sports shooting
- Club: U.S. Army Marksmanship Unit; U.S. Army WCAP
Medal record
Representing United States
Pan American Games
Gold medal – first place	1999 Winnipeg	10m air pistol
Gold medal – first place	2003 Santo Domingo	50m pistol
Gold medal – first place	2011 Guadalajara	10m air pistol
Silver medal – second place	1999 Winnipeg	50m pistol
Silver medal – second place	2007 Rio de Janeiro	50m pistol
Silver medal – second place	2011 Guadalajara	50m pistol

Daryl Szarenski (born March 14, 1968) is an American sport shooter who competes in pistol events. At the 2012 Summer Olympics, he finished 23rd in the qualifying round, failing to make the cut for the final. He has also competed at the 2000, 2004 and 2008 Summer Olympics.

Szarenski is Sergeant First Class with the U.S. Army. He studied industrial technology at Tennessee Tech University, where he competed both in the pistol and rifle, and later at Roger Williams University.
