= Carlos Keller (racquetball) =

Bolivian racquetball player (born 1992)

Personal information
- Born: Carlos Keller Vargas; February 8, 1992 (age 34) Santa Cruz de la Sierra, Bolivia

Sport
- Sport: Racquetball
Medal record
Men's Racquetball
Representing Bolivia
World Championships
Bronze medal – third place	2024 San Antonio	Singles
Bronze medal – third place	2014 Burlington	Singles
Bronze medal – third place	2010 Seoul	Team
Pan American Games
Gold medal – first place	2023 Santiago	Team
Silver medal – second place	2023 Santiago	Singles
Gold medal – first place	2019 Lima	Team
Bronze medal – third place	2015 Toronto	Team
South American Games
Bronze medal – third place	2018 Cochabamba	Singles
Gold medal – first place	2018 Cochabamba	Team
Bolivarian Games
Bronze medal – third place	2017 Santa Marta	Singles
Gold medal – first place	2017 Santa Marta	Team
Gold medal – first place	2013 Trujillo	Singles
Silver medal – second place	2013 Trujillo	Team
Silver medal – second place	2009 Sucre	Singles
Pan American Racquetball Championships
Gold medal – first place	2025 Guatemala City	Team
Silver medal – second place	2023 Guatemala City	Singles
Gold medal – first place	2022 Santa Cruz	Team
Gold medal – first place	2019 Barranquilla	Singles
Gold medal – first place	2018 Temuco	Singles
Bronze medal – third place	2015 Santo Domingo	Singles
Bronze medal – third place	2013 Cali	Singles
Bronze medal – third place	2010 San Pedro Sula	Doubles

Carlos Keller (born February 8, 1992) is a Bolivian racquetball player. Keller was on the Bolivian Men's Team that won back to back gold medals at the Pan American Games in 2019 and 2023. Their first gold medal at the 2019 games in Lima, Peru was Bolivia's first racquetball gold medal at the Pan Am Games, and they successfully defended that gold at the 2023 Games in Santiago, Chile. He was also part of the Bolivian men's team that won gold at the 2025 Pan American Racquetball Championships, and Keller is a former two time Pan Am Champion in Men's Singles, winning in 2018 and 2019.

== Junior years (2006–2011) ==
Keller represented Bolivia at the International Racquetball Federation (IRF) World Junior Championships in each of the last six years of eligibility. At the 2006 World Junior Championships in Tempe, Arizona, Keller lost in the U14 Singles quarterfinals to Taylor Knoth of the USA. In the U14 Doubles, Keller and Carlos Tapia lost to Mexicans Alejandro Cardona and Pedro Gonzalez in the semi-finals.

At the 2007 World Junior Championships in Cochabamba, Bolivia, Keller was runner-up in the U14 Singles to the USA's Marco Rojas, losing the final, 6–15, 15–8, 11–2. He won the U14 Doubles with Jorge Luis Michel defeating Canadians Kevin Caouette and Samuel Murray in the final. The pair would play doubles together at the next four World Junior Championships.

In 2008, Keller lost in the semi-finals of the U16 Singles at the World Junior Championships in Tempe, Arizona, as he was beaten by Bradley Kirch of the US, 15–1, 15–6. Then in the U16 Doubles, he and Michel lost in the quarterfinals to Canadians Pedro Castro and Jamie Slamko, 15–13, 11–15, 11–10.

In 2009, Keller won both the U16 Singles and Doubles at the World Juniors. In singles, he defeated Marco Rojas of the US in the final, 4–15, 15–13, 11–2. In doubles, he and Michel beat the USA's Joshua Hungerford and Nick Montalbano in the final, 15–12, 15–12.

At the 2010 World Junior Championships, Keller played the U18 and lost in the quarterfinals of the singles division to Mexico's Jaime Martell. In doubles, Keller and Michel lost in the final to Bradley Kirch and Nick Montalbano of the US, 15–7, 15–4.

2011 was Keller's last year of juniors, and he won the U18 Singles at the 2011 World Junior Championships in Santo Domingo, Dominican Republic, by beating Daniel de la Rosa of Mexico in the final, 15–9, 15–5, after defeating the De La Rosa's team-mate Jaime Martell, 15–11, 15–6, in the semi-finals, and Jose Diaz of the US in the quarterfinals, 10–15, 15–11, 11–9. He and Michel were runners-up in the U18 Doubles, as they lost to the US's Joshua Hungerford and Nick Montalbano in the final, 15–9, 11–15, 11–4.

Keller won four IRF World Junior titles over six years: two in Boys' Singles (U16 in 2009 & U18 in 2011) and two in Boys' Doubles (U14 in 2007 & U16 in 2009).

== Playing for Bolivia 2009–2019 ==
Keller first played for the Bolivian national team at the 2009 Bolivarian Games in Sucre, Bolivia, when he was 17. There he reached the final with wins over Colombians Juan Herrera in the quarterfinals, 15–13, 15–7, and Francisco Gomez, 15–2, 15–3, in the semi-finals, but lost to team-mate Ricardo Monroy, 15–11, 15–8.

At the 2010 Pan American Racquetball Championships, he lost in the Round of 16 to Costa Rica's Ivan Villegas, 15–11, 15–3, in Men's Singles but reached the podium with Ricardo Monroy in Men's Doubles, as they beat Argentines David Maggi and Shai Manzuri, 15–8, 5–15, 11–5, but then lost to Mexicans Ruben Estrada and Alejandro Landa, 15–14, 15–7.

In 2010, Keller went to the IRF World Championships for the first time, which was held in Seoul. He played doubles with Ricardo Monroy, losing to Fernando Rios and Jose Daniel Alvarez of Ecuador in the Round of 16, 10–15, 15–10, 11–9. In the Men's Team event, Bolivia defeated Venezuela in the quarterfinals, and lost in the semis to the US, and finished in third place.

Keller played at the 2011 Pan American Racquetball Championships in Managua, Nicaragua, reaching the quarterfinals in Men's Singles, where he lost to Daniel de la Rosa of Mexico, 15–2, 15–8. He also played in Men's Doubles with Fernando Paccieri, and they lost in the Round of 16 to Ecuadorians Fernando Rios and Jose Daniel Ugalde, 15–10, 15–14.

Keller played at the 2011 Pan American Games in Guadalajara, Mexico, where he lost in the quarterfinals of Men's Singles to the USA's Rocky Carson, 15–11, 15–0. He also played in the Men's Team event, in which Bolivia lost in the quarterfinals to the US.

At the 2012 Pan American Championships in Temuco, Chile, Keller lost in the quarterfinals to eventual champion Canadian Mike Green, 15–11, 15–11.

At the 2012 World Championships in Santo Domingo, Dominican Republic, Keller beat Jose Daniel Ugalde of Ecuador, 15–7, 13–15, 11–1, in the Round of 32, and the beat Canadian Tim Landeryou, 15–13, 15–4, in the Round of 16, but he lost to Mexican Polo Gutierrez in the quarterfinals, 15–8, 15–10. In the Men's Team event, Bolivia came fourth after losing in the semi-finals to the United States and then dropping the third-place match to Mexico.

Keller won the Men's Open at the 2012 US Open. He beat Marco Rojas in the final, 15–4, 15–12, after defeating Alejandro Herrera, 15–14, 15–8, in the semi-finals, Jose Diaz in the quarterfinals, 13–15, 15–14, 11–8, and David Horn in the Round of 16, 9–15, 15–10, 11–6.

Keller was a bronze medalist at the 2013 Pan American Championships, as he reached the semi-finals with a forfeit win over Daniel Maggi of Argentina in the quarterfinals. He lost to Mexican Polo Gutierrez in the semis, 15–3, 15–12.

Keller's first gold medal came at the 2013 Bolivarian Games in Trujillo, Peru, where he won the Men's Singles. He defeated Jose Daniel Ugalde of Ecuador in the semi-finals, 15–7, 15–12, and beat Ugalde's team-mate Fernando Rios in the final, 15–7, 15–2. But in the Men's Team event, Ecuador came out on top, beating Bolivia in the final, 2–1.

Keller reached the podium for the first time at Worlds in Burlington, Ontario in 2014, when he beat Canadian Tim Landeryou in the quarterfinals, 15–6, 15–12, to put him into a semi-final showdown with fellow Bolivian Conrrado Moscoso, which Moscoso won, 15–11, 11–15, 11–3.

Keller was a bronze medalist at the 2015 Pan American Championships. He defeated Costa Rican Felipe Camacho in the Round of 16, 15–10, 14–15, 11–7, and Mexican Álvaro Beltrán in the quarterfinals, 15–12, 15–11, but lost to the American Jake Bredenbeck, 15–13, 15–13, in the semi-finals.

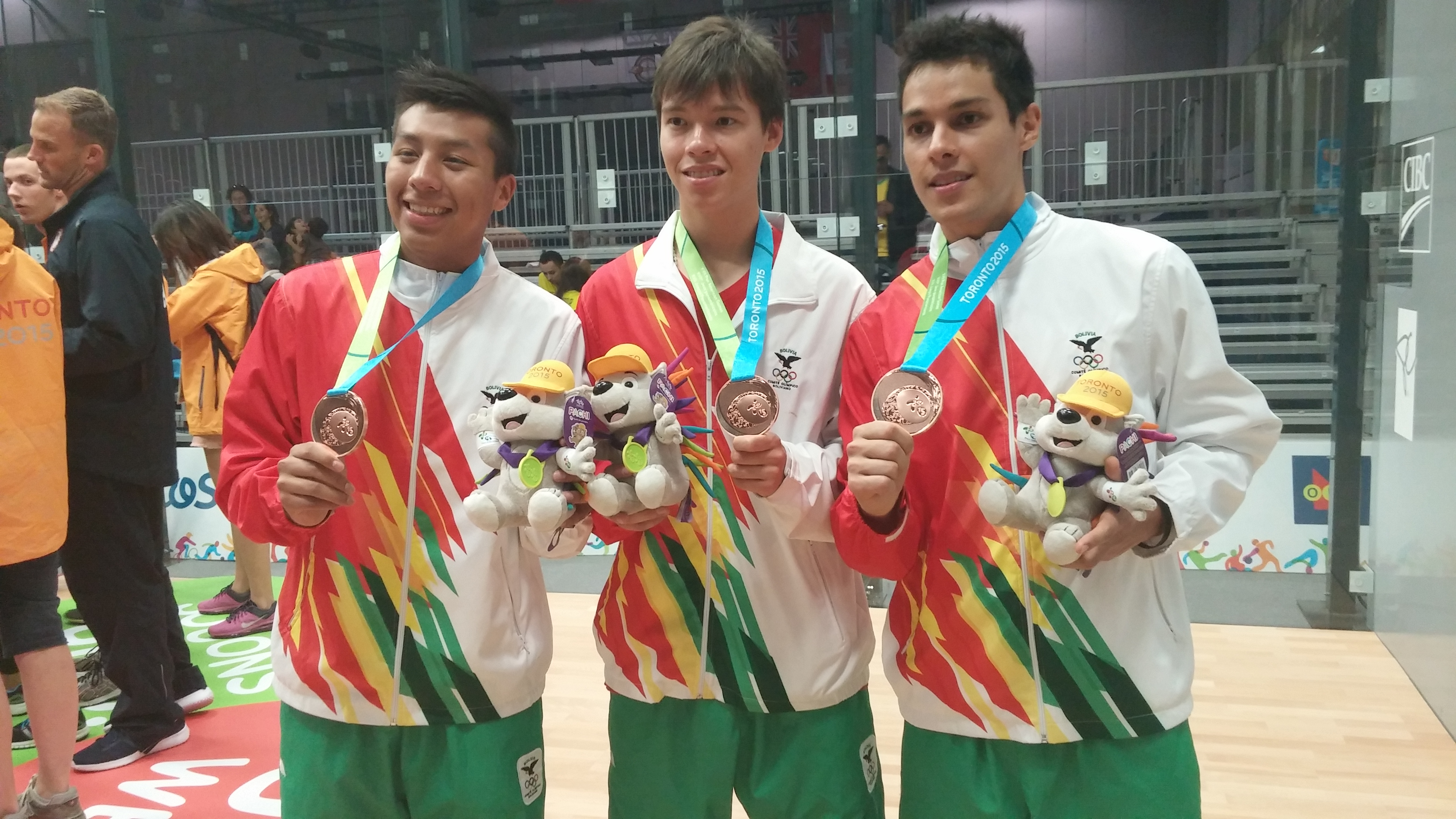
Bolivia's Racquetball Men's team at the 2015 Pan American Games (Conrrado Moscoso, Carlos Keller, Roland Keller)

Keller played in his second Pan American Games in 2015, when the games were held in Toronto, where he spoiled Canadian Mike Green's hope for a medal on home soil, by beating Green in the Round of 16, 11–15, 15–6, 11–0. But Keller didn't reach the podium either, as he lost in the quarterfinals to fellow Bolivian Conrrado Moscoso, 15–3, 15–5. However, Keller did get a medal in the Men's Team event, as Bolivia defeated Colombia in the quarterfinals, but lost in the semi-finals to Mexico.

In 2016, Keller played Men's Doubles at Worlds with Kadim Carrasco, and they beat Canadians Mike Green and Tim Landeryou, 6–15, 15–2, 11–8, in the quarterfinals, which put them in the semi-finals against the USA's Jake Bredenbeck and Jose Diaz, losing 15–14, 8–15, 11–8.

In the group stage of the 2017 Pan American Championships, Keller lost to Andrés Acuña of Costa Rica, 15–8, 15–6. The loss put him on the same side of the draw as team-mate Conrrado Moscoso for the medal round. They met in the Round of 16 with Keller coming out on top, 9–15, 15–10, 11–6. But the win didn't carry over to the next round, as Keller lost to the US's Charlie Pratt, 15–4, 9–15, 11–5.

For the second time, Keller was a double medalist at the Bolivarian Games. In 2017 in Santa Marta, Colombia, he got bronze in Men's Singles, when he lost to Sebastian Franco in the semi-finals, 15–14, 11–15, 11–4. But Keller and his teammates won gold in the Men's Team event, defeating Ecuador in the final.

Keller won Men's Singles at the 2018 Pan American Championships in Temuco, Chile, where he beat David Horn of the USA in the final, 15–12, 5–15, 11–7. En route to the final, Keller defeated Edwin Galicia of Guatemala, 15–7, 7–15, 11–5, in the Round of 16, Cuban Maikel Mollet, 15–7, 15–7, in the quarterfinals, and Mexican Rodrigo Montoya, 15–6, 2–15, 11–4, in the semi-finals. He's the second Bolivian to be Pan American Champion in Men's Singles (after Ricardo Monroy).

Keller won two medals at the 2018 South American Games in Cochabamba, Bolivia. He was a bronze medalist in Men's Singles after losing to Colombia Mario Mercado in the semi-finals, 15–8, 15–14, but defeated Mercado, 15–10, 10–15, 11–8, in the Men's Team final to help Bolivia defeat Colombia and capture the gold medal.

He successfully defended his Pan American Championship title in Men's Singles at the 2019 Pan American Racquetball Championships in Barranquilla, Colombia, where Keller defeated the USA's Charlie Pratt in the final, 15–2, 8–15, 11–5. He reached the final by beating Canadian Coby Iwaasa in the Round of 16, 15–10, 15–9, David Horn of the US, 15–10, 15–12, in the quarterfinals, and Mexico's Álvaro Beltrán in the semi-finals, 15–13, 15–8. Keller's the first Bolivian to win the Pan American Men's Singles title twice.

At the 2019 Pan American Games in Lima, Peru, Keller was part of the Bolivian Men's Team that won gold in the Men's Team event, which was Bolivia's first racquetball gold medal at the Pan Am Games, and Bolivia's only gold medal at that year's Pan Am Games. They defeated the US in the semi-finals, 2–1, helped by Keller's win over Jake Bredenbeck. In the final, Bolivia defeated Colombia, 2–1; Keller lost his match against Mario Mercado, but his teammates won their matches to win gold.

Keller also played Men's Singles in Lima, but he lost in the Round of 16 to Canadian Samuel Murray, 13–15, 15–14, 11–3.

== Playing on the IRT – 2019–present ==
Keller only played once a season on the International Racquetball Tour (IRT) until 2019. Those few appearances were at the US Open, where his best result was reaching the Round of 32, which Keller did three times.

In the 2019–20 season, he played 9 of the 10 events and finished 19th in the rankings having never made it past the Round of 16. Keller's breakthrough came in the 2021 season, as he made the semi-finals in Denver, the quarterfinals in Illinois, and the final of the 2021 US Open.

In Denver, Keller beat Samuel Murray, 15–6, 15–4, in the Round of 16, Mario Mercado in the quarterfinals, 15–13, 14–15, 11–6, before losing to fellow countryman Conrrado Moscoso in the semi-finals, 15–10, 15–14. Then in Illinois, Keller beat Álvaro Beltrán in the Round of 16, 15–8, 15–5, but then lost to Murray in the quarters, 15–8, 15–5. He also played doubles with Kadim Carrasco in Illinois, and lost to Andree Parrilla and Eduardo Portillo, 15–3, 15–5, in the quarterfinals.

At the 2021 US Open in Minneapolis, Keller beat Moscoso in the Round of 16, 15–13, 15–5, and Murray in the quarterfinals, 15–11, 15–12, which put him into the semi-finals against Kane Waselenchuk, the 15 time US Open champion. Shockingly, Waselenchuk withdrew from the tournament prior to the semi-final with Keller, so Keller reached his 1st US Open IRT final. He's the second Bolivian to be in a US Open final after Conrrado Moscoso.

He faced Daniel de la Rosa in the final, and after losing the first game, he won game two to force a tie-breaker, which was the first time an IRT US Open final went to a breaker in its 25-year history. Unfortunately for Keller, De La Rosa won the breaker, to claim his first US Open title. He played doubles in Minneapolis with Kadim Carrasco, and they lost in the quarterfinals to Sudsy Monchik and Waselenchuk, 15–13, 15–11.

Keller won gold in the Men's Team event at the 2022 Pan American Racquetball Championships, in Santa Cruz de la Sierra, Bolivia, and in the final defeated Mexican Elias Nieto, 11–6, 11–5, 11–6, to help Bolivia defeat Mexico. He played Men's Singles and Men's Doubles in Santa Cruz. He lost to Costa Rican Andrés Acuña, 15–11, 15–6, 15–12, in the quarterfinals of singles, and with Kadim Carrasco, lost in the quarters of Men's Doubles to Juan Francisco Cueva and Jose Daniel Ugalde, 15–13, 15–14, 15–14.

== Career summary ==
Playing for Bolivia, Keller has won several medals, highlighted by his two Pan American Racquetball Championships titles in Men's Singles, and two gold in the Men's Team events: one at the 2019 Pan American Games and one at the 2022 Pan Am Championships

== Personal life ==
Keller's older brother, Roland, is also an elite racquetball player, and has represented Bolivia internationally.

== See also ==
- List of racquetball players
