= Rudolf Knijnenburg =

Bolivian sports shooter (born 1982)

Personal information
- Full name: Rudolf Knijnenburg Cordero
- Nationality: Bolivia
- Born: 18 May 1982 (age 44) Santa Cruz de la Sierra, Bolivia
- Height: 1.75 m (5 ft 9 in)
- Weight: 74 kg (163 lb)

Sport
- Sport: Shooting
- Event(s): 10 m air pistol (AP40); 50 m pistol (FP)
- Club: Associacion Crucena De Tiro

Rudolf Knijnenburg Cordero (born May 18, 1982 in Santa Cruz de la Sierra) is a Bolivian sport shooter. He represented his nation Bolivia in pistol shooting at the 2004 Summer Olympics and in four editions of the Pan American Games (2003, 2007, 2011, and 2015).

Knijnenburg qualified as a lone shooter for the Bolivian squad in the men's 10 m air pistol at the 2004 Summer Olympics in Athens after having accepted an invitational berth for his country from the International Shooting Sport Federation with a minimum score of 570. He rounded off the field of forty-seven shooters with the lowest overall score in the prelims, firing at 548 points.

Despite missing out his 2008 and 2012 Olympic bid, Knijnenburg's most remarkable feat came at the 2011 Pan American Games in Guadalajara, where he finished seventh in the air pistol final with a total of 669.7 points.
