= Shooting at the 2015 Pan American Games – Women's 10 metre air rifle =

Shooting – Women's 10 metre air rifle at the 2015 Pan American Games
- Venue: Pan Am Shooting Centre
- Dates: July 13
- Competitors: 28 from 16 nations
- Winning score: 204.8

Medalists
Gold medal	Goretti Zumaya	Mexico
Silver medal	Fernanda Russo	Argentina
Bronze medal	Eglis Yaima Cruz	Cuba

The women's 10 metre air rifle shooting event at the 2015 Pan American Games will be held on July 13 at the Pan Am Shooting Centre in Innisfil.

The event consisted of two rounds: a qualifier and a final. In the qualifier, each shooter fired 60 shots with an air rifle at 10 metres distance from the standing position. Scores for each shot were in increments of 1, with a maximum score of 10.

The top 8 shooters in the qualifying round moved on to the final round. There, they fired an additional 10 shots. These shots scored in increments of .1, with a maximum score of 10.9. The total score from all 70 shots was used to determine final ranking.

The winners of all fifteen events, along with the runner up in the men's air rifle, skeet, trap and both women's rifle events will qualify for the 2016 Summer Olympics in Rio de Janeiro, Brazil (granted the athlete has not yet earned a quota for their country).

== Schedule ==
All times are Central Standard Time (UTC-6).

Date	Time	Round
July 13, 2015	11:15	Qualification
July 13, 2015	14:00	Final

== Results ==
=== Qualification round ===
Rank	Athlete	Country	1	2	3	4	Total	Notes
1	Eglis Yaima Cruz	Cuba	103.2	103.5	103.3	103.5	413.5	Q, PR
2	Ana Ramirez	El Salvador	103.4	102.7	104.3	102.9	413.3	Q
3	Elizabeth Marsh	United States	103.0	102.8	103.2	102.7	411.7	Q
4	Fernanda Russo	Argentina	104.3	101.7	102.5	102.8	411.3	Q
5	Elayne Perez	Cuba	99.9	102.5	104.0	103.6	410.0	Q
6	Amelia Fournel	Argentina	101.7	103.4	102.5	102.4	410.0	Q
7	Goretti Zumaya	Mexico	101.9	102.7	101.1	103.8	409.5	Q
8	Amy Bock	Puerto Rico	103.8	101.4	102.6	101.1	408.9	Q
9	Salma Ramos	Mexico	101.1	102.5	103.2	100.4	407.2	
10	Sara Vizcarra	Peru	101.1	101.3	101.9	102.3	406.6	
11	Dairene Marquez	Venezuela	101.9	101.2	102.7	100.8	406.6	
12	Maria Andrade	Ecuador	102.0	99.5	101.5	103.3	406.3	
13	Sarah Osborn	United States	101.6	102.8	101.3	100.6	406.3	
14	Diliana Méndez	Venezuela	101.9	101.4	101.7	100.8	405.8	
15	Yarimar Mercado	Puerto Rico	101.1	102.5	102.9	98.9	405.4	
16	Rosane Ewald	Brazil	99.5	101.1	103.0	101.2	404.8	
17	Monica Fyfe	Canada	98.5	101.9	102.3	101.5	404.2	
18	Maria Guerra	Guatemala	99.6	100.9	100.5	101.4	402.4	
19	Ana Garcia	Bolivia	99.0	99.8	102.1	100.8	401.7	
20	Johana Pineda	El Salvador	99.4	100.9	99.6	101.3	401.2	
21	Diana Cabrera	Uruguay	99.5	99.5	100.5	101.2	400.7	
22	Karina Vera	Chile	98.6	100.1	101.3	100.7	400.7	
23	Aerial Arthur	Canada	100.5	101.0	98.2	100.4	400.1	
24	Polymaria Velasquez	Guatemala	99.9	103.1	95.3	101.5	399.8	
25	Gabriela Lobos	Chile	98.2	100.1	99.6	100.3	398.2	
26	Sofia Padilla	Ecuador	100.9	97.7	99.3	100.3	398.2	
27	Yubelka Nouel	Dominican Republic	98.5	96.5	101.7	94.6	391.3	
28	Raquel Gomes	Brazil	89.4	89.6	95.9	99.7	374.6	

=== Final ===
Rank	Athlete	Country	1	2	3	4	5	6	7	8	9	Total	Notes
1st place, gold medalist(s)	Goretti Zumaya	Mexico	30.5; 9.6; 10.5; 10.4	61.4; 10.1; 10.1; 10.7	81.6; 10.3; 9.9	102.1; 10.4; 10.1	123.0; 10.4; 10.5	142.7; 9.4; 10.3	163.9; 10.5; 10.7	184.4; 10.3; 10.2	204.8; 10.2; 10.2	204.8	FPR
2nd place, silver medalist(s)	Fernanda Russo	Argentina	29.8; 10.3; 9.4; 10.1	60.9; 10.6; 10.1; 10.4	81.4; 9.9; 10.6	100.7; 9.8; 9.5	121.7; 10.7; 10.3	142.9; 10.6; 10.6	163.9; 10.2; 10.8	184.5; 10.8; 9.8	204.7; 9.8; 10.4	204.7	
3rd place, bronze medalist(s)	Eglis Yaima Cruz	Cuba	31.1; 10.3; 10.3; 10.5	61.8; 10.3; 10.0; 10.4	82.5; 10.1; 10.6	102.2; 9.9; 9.8	123.3; 10.8; 10.3	143.7; 10.6; 9.8	164.3; 10.5; 10.1	184.4; 10.2; 9.9	184.4	184.4	
4	Amy Bock	Puerto Rico	31.7; 10.5; 10.7; 10.5	60.8; 9.8; 9.6; 9.7	81.6; 10.7; 10.1	101.5; 10.3; 9.6	122.1; 10.1; 10.5	142.4; 10.4; 9.9	163.3; 10.1; 10.8	163.3	163.3	163.3	
5	Amelia Fournel	Argentina	31.0; 10.7; 9.7; 10.6	60.6; 9.2; 10.1; 10.3	81.1; 10.1; 10.4	101.3; 9.9; 10.3	121.9; 10.3; 10.3	141.9; 10.2; 9.8	141.9	141.9	141.9	141.9	
6	Elayne Perez	Cuba	29.2; 9.4; 9.5; 10.3	59.6; 10.7; 9.9; 9.8	80.3; 10.6; 10.1	100.5; 10.5; 9.7	119.4; 9.8; 9.1	119.4	119.4	119.4	119.4	119.4	
7	Ana Ramirez	El Salvador	29.5; 9.1; 10.4; 10.0	59.9; 10.2; 9.7; 10.5	80.6; 10.5; 10.2	100.3; 10.1; 9.6	100.3	100.3	100.3	100.3	100.3	100.3	
8	Elizabeth Marsh	United States	29.2; 9.0; 10.1; 10.1	59.1; 9.0; 10.6; 10.3	79.8; 10.1; 10.6	79.8	79.8	79.8	79.8	79.8	79.8	79.8	
