= Shooting at the 2015 Pan American Games – Women's 50 metre rifle three positions =

Shooting – Women's 50 metre rifle three positions at the 2015 Pan American Games
- Venue: Pan Am Shooting Centre
- Dates: July 18
- Competitors: 27 from 16 nations
- Winning score: 451.7

Medalists
Gold medal	Eglis Yaima Cruz	Cuba
Silver medal	Amelia Fournel	Argentina
Bronze medal	Yarimar Mercado	Puerto Rico

The Women's 50 metre rifle three positions shooting event at the 2015 Pan American Games will be held on July 18 at the Pan Am Shooting Centre in Innisfil.

The event consisted of two rounds: a qualifier and a final. In the qualifier, each shooter fired 60 shots with a .22 Long Rifle at 50 metres distance. 20 shots were fired each from the standing, kneeling, and prone positions. Scores for each shot were in increments of 1, with a maximum score of 10.

The top 8 shooters in the qualifying round moved on to the final round. There, they fired an additional 10 shots, all from the standing position. These shots scored in increments of .1, with a maximum score of 10.9. The total score from all 70 shots was used to determine final ranking.

The winners of all fifteen events, along with the runner up in the men's air rifle, skeet, trap and both women's rifle events will qualify for the 2016 Summer Olympics in Rio de Janeiro, Brazil (granted the athlete has not yet earned a quota for their country).

== Schedule ==
All times are Central Standard Time (UTC-6).

Date	Time	Round
July 18, 2015	9:15	Qualification
July 18, 2015	12:00	Final

== Results ==
=== Qualification round ===
Results.

Rank	Athlete	Country	Kneeling	Prone	Standing	Total	Notes
1	Eglis Yaima Cruz	Cuba	196	196	192	584-29x	Q, EPR
2	Ana Ramirez	El Salvador	195	199	187	581-21x	Q
3	Diliana Méndez	Venezuela	192	191	190	573-20x	Q
4	Amanda Furrer	United States	189	197	186	572-23x	Q
5	Alexis Martínez	Mexico	193	196	183	572-21x	Q
6	Yarimar Mercado	Puerto Rico	189	197	185	571-22x	Q
7	Hannah Black	United States	189	196	186	571-18x	Q
8	Amelia Fournel	Argentina	194	193	182	569-17x	Q
9	Nancy Leal	Mexico	186	194	187	567-21x	
10	Gabriela Lobos	Chile	188	194	185	567-17x	
11	Sara Vizcarra	Peru	191	194	182	567-16x	
12	Dianelys Pérez	Cuba	190	190	186	566-19x	
13	Maria Guerra	Guatemala	182	198	185	565-23x	
14	Sharon Bowes	Canada	188	192	185	565-19x	
15	Diana Velasco	Guatemala	187	193	185	565-18x	A1
16	Johana Pineda	El Salvador	189	194	182	565-18x	
17	Dairene Marquez	Venezuela	190	192	183	565-17x	
18	Shannon Westlake	Canada	187	194	180	561-14x	
19	Sofia Padilla	Ecuador	186	193	179	558-12x	
20	Amy Bock	Puerto Rico	188	197	172	557-18x	
21	Diana Cabrera	Uruguay	184	196	176	556-13x	
22	Rosane Ewald	Brazil	179	192	184	555-17x	A2
23	Maria Andrade	Ecuador	181	190	184	555-14x	
24	Yubelka Nouel	Dominican Republic	182	192	180	554-11x	
25	Ana Garcia	Bolivia	175	188	185	548-11x	
26	Raquel Gomes	Brazil	177	187	174	538-09x	
27	Karina Vera	Chile	175	190	172	537-13x	

- A1 .- 2 Points penalty. ISSF rules 6.11.1.1 L.
- A2 .- 2 Points penalty. ISSF rules 6.11.8.3

=== Final ===
Rank	Athlete	Country	Kneeling	Prone	Standing	1	2	3	4	5	Total	Notes
1st place, gold medalist(s)	Eglis Yaima Cruz	Cuba	151.5; 50.5; 51.2; 49.8	303.9; 49.6; 50.8; 52.0	403.2; 50.1; 49.2	413.2; 10.0	421.8; 8.6	432.1; 10.3	442.1; 10.0	451.7; 9.6	451.7	FPR
2nd place, silver medalist(s)	Amelia Fournel	Argentina	146.8; 49.5; 48.8; 48.5	298.0; 51.2; 49.4; 50.6	398.4; 50.0; 50.4	408.6; 10.2	417.7; 9.1	428.0; 10.3	436.9; 8.9	446.1; 9.2	446.1	
3rd place, bronze medalist(s)	Yarimar Mercado	Puerto Rico	147.5; 48.7; 47.1; 51.7	298.8; 49.8; 50.9; 50.6	399.9; 49.9; 51.2	410.2; 10.3	419.5; 9.3	428.9; 9.4	435.2; 6.3		435.2	
4	Diliana Méndez	Venezuela	148.3; 50.1; 50.2; 48.0	300.9; 50.3; 51.1; 51.2	396.3; 47.2; 48.2	406.8; 10.5	416.9; 10.1	425.9; 9.0			425.9	
5	Hannah Black	United States	149.6; 50.2; 50.3; 49.1	299.6; 51.8; 50.2; 48.0	396.8; 49.6; 47.6	406.6; 9.8	415.7; 9.1				415.7	
6	Amanda Furrer	United States	148.3; 48.5; 49.3; 50.5	301.6; 49.5; 52.0; 51.8	394.1; 49.7; 42.8	404.2; 10.1					404.2	
7	Ana Ramirez	El Salvador	147.5; 46.8; 49.6; 51.1	298.6; 49.9; 50.5; 50.7	393.2; 47.9; 46.7						393.2	
8	Alexis Martínez	Mexico	149.4; 49.8; 49.4; 50.2	301.2; 49.0; 51.2; 51.6	390.2; 40.5; 48.5						390.2	
