= Shooting at the 2010 South American Games – Women's 10m air rifle =

The Women's 10m air rifle event at the 2010 South American Games was held on March 23, with the qualification at 12:00 and the Finals at 14:00.

== Individual ==
=== Medalists ===
Gold	Silver	Bronze
Roberta Cabo; Brazil	Wendy Daisy de la Cruz; Bolivia	Cecilia Elena Zeid; Argentina

=== Results ===
==== Qualification ====
Rank	Athlete	Series				Total	Shoot-off
Rank	Athlete	1	2	3	4	Total	Shoot-off
1	Roberta Cabo (BRA)	99	95	99	96	389	
2	Karina Paola Cerpa (CHI)	97	96	97	98	388	
2	Wendy Daisy de la Cruz (BOL)	97	97	96	98	388	
2	Cecilia Elena Zeid (ARG)	97	97	97	97	388	
2	Diliana Méndez (VEN)	95	99	97	97	388	
6	Amelia Fournel (ARG)	97	94	99	96	386	
7	Sofia Estefania Bustamante (ECU)	96	94	96	97	383	
8	Monica Patricia Guzman (COL)	95	95	99	93	382	
8	Diana Cabrera (URU)	96	96	97	93	382	
10	Gabriela Plaza (CHI)	93	94	96	96	379	
11	Rosane Ewald (BRA)	95	96	93	94	378	
12	Karina Paola Loayza (PER)	92	93	94	98	377	
13	Carla Daniela Delgado (ECU)	95	96	93	92	376	
14	Lidnimar Rebolledo (VEN)	90	94	94	91	369	
15	Silvia Alejandra Lopez (PER)	89	90	90	96	365	
16	Magaly Amezquita (COL)	90	90	90	89	359	

==== Final ====
Rank	Athlete	Qual Score	Final Score	Total	Shoot-off
1st place, gold medalist(s)	Roberta Cabo (BRA)	389	99.8	488.8	
2nd place, silver medalist(s)	Wendy Daisy de la Cruz (BOL)	388	100.3	488.3	
3rd place, bronze medalist(s)	Cecilia Elena Zeid (ARG)	388	99.6	487.6	
4	Amelia Fournel (ARG)	386	100.4	486.4	
5	Diliana Méndez (VEN)	388	97.3	485.3	
6	Karina Paola Cerpa (CHI)	388	95.8	483.8	
7	Monica Patricia Guzman (COL)	382	101.2	483.2	
8	Sofia Estefania Bustamante (ECU)	383	96.2	479.2	

== Team ==
=== Medalists ===
Gold	Silver	Bronze
Cecilia Elena Zeid; Amelia Fournel; Argentina	Karina Paola Cerpa; Gabriela Plaza; Chile	Roberta Cabo; Rosane Ewald; Brazil

=== Results ===
Rank	Athlete	Series				Total
Rank	Athlete	1	2	3	4	Total
1st place, gold medalist(s)	Argentina					774
1st place, gold medalist(s)	Cecilia Elena Zeid (ARG)	97	97	97	97	388
1st place, gold medalist(s)	Amelia Fournel (ARG)	97	94	99	96	386
2nd place, silver medalist(s)	Chile					767
2nd place, silver medalist(s)	Karina Paola Cerpa (CHI)	97	96	97	98	388
2nd place, silver medalist(s)	Gabriela Plaza (CHI)	93	94	96	96	379
3rd place, bronze medalist(s)	Brazil					767
3rd place, bronze medalist(s)	Roberta Cabo (BRA)	99	95	99	96	389
3rd place, bronze medalist(s)	Rosane Ewald (BRA)	95	96	93	94	378
4	Ecuador					759
4	Sofia Estefania Bustamante (ECU)	96	94	96	97	383
4	Carla Daniela Delgado (ECU)	95	96	93	92	376
5	Venezuela					757
5	Diliana Méndez (VEN)	95	99	97	97	388
5	Lidnimar Rebolledo (VEN)	90	94	94	91	369
6	Peru					742
6	Karina Paola Loayza (PER)	92	93	94	98	377
6	Silvia Alejandra Lopez (PER)	89	90	90	96	365
7	Colombia					741
7	Monica Patricia Guzman (COL)	95	95	99	93	382
7	Magaly Amezquita (COL)	90	90	90	89	359
