= Shooting at the 2026 Central American and Caribbean Games =

- Venue: Centro Ecuestre Palmarejo (Pistol and Rifle); Polígono de Tiro al Plato El Higüero (Shotgun)
- Location: Santo Domingo, Dominican Republic
- Dates: 24–30 July (Shotgun); 1–6 August (Pistol and Rifle)

The shooting competition at the 2026 Central American and Caribbean Games was held in Santo Domingo, Dominican Republic, from 24 July to 6 August 2026 at the Centro Ecuestre Palmarejo and Polígono de Tiro al Plato El Higüero.

== Medal table ==
* Host nation (Dominican Republic)

| Rank | Nation | Gold | Silver | Bronze | Total |
|---|---|---|---|---|---|
| 1 | Mexico (MEX) | 13 | 5 | 10 | 28 |
| 2 | Guatemala (GUA) | 4 | 9 | 4 | 17 |
| 3 | Venezuela (VEN) | 4 | 3 | 2 | 9 |
| 4 | Puerto Rico (PUR) | 2 | 2 | 0 | 4 |
| 5 | Cuba (CUB) | 0 | 3 | 2 | 5 |
| 6 | Dominican Republic (DOM)* | 0 | 1 | 1 | 2 |
| 7 | Colombia (COL) | 0 | 0 | 2 | 2 |
| 7 | Guadeloupe (GLP) | 0 | 0 | 2 | 2 |
| Totals (8 entries) | | 23 | 23 | 23 | 69 |

== Medal summary ==
=== Men's events ===
| Event | Gold | Silver | Bronze |
|---|---|---|---|
| 10 m air rifle | Edson Ramírez; Mexico | Allan Márquez; Guatemala | Iván López; Colombia |
| 10 m air rifle team | Mexico; Carlos Quezada; Edson Ramírez; Hugo González | Guatemala; Donalson Muñoz; Douglas Oliva; Allan Márquez | Cuba; Rainier Quintanilla; Jonathan González; Eddy Vázquez |
| 50 m rifle 3 positions | Julio Iemma; Venezuela | Carlos Quezada; Mexico | Douglas Oliva; Guatemala |
| 50 m rifle 3 positions team | Guatemala; Donalson Muñoz; Douglas Oliva; Octavio Sandoval | Venezuela; Anibal Pérez; Santiago Niño; Julio Iemma | Mexico; Carlos Quezada; Edson Ramírez; Howard Tijerina |
| 10 m air pistol | David Valdez Mouet; Mexico | Diego Oduber; Venezuela | Sebastián Sánchez; Colombia |
| 10 m air pistol team | Venezuela; Diego Oduber; Douglas Gómez de Freitas; Rafael Ochoa | Mexico; Carlos González Garza; Daniel Urquiza; David Valdez Mouet | Guatemala; Albino Jiménez; José Castillo Aguilar; David Castillo Aguilar |
| 25 m rapid fire pistol | Douglas Gómez Salazar; Venezuela | Alejandro Delgado; Cuba | Diego Oduber; Venezuela |
| 25 m rapid fire pistol team | Venezuela; Douglas Gómez Salazar; Diego Oduber; Douglas Gómez de Freitas | Cuba; Milton Santiesteban; Jorge Grau; Alejandro Delgado | Mexico; Fidencio González; Daniel Urquiza; David Valdez Mouet |
| Trap | Jorge Orozco; Mexico | Jean Pierre Brol; Guatemala | Eduardo Lorenzo; Dominican Republic |
| Trap team | Guatemala; Jean Pierre Brol; Hebert Brol; Fernando Brol | Dominican Republic; Domingo Lorenzo; Eduardo Lorenzo; Henry Tejeda | Venezuela; Mario Soares; Leonel Martínez; Gabriele Evangelista |
| Skeet | Luis Gallardo; Mexico | Sebastián Bermúdez; Guatemala | Jesús Balboa; Mexico |
| Skeet team | Guatemala; Sebastián Bermúdez; Carlos Padilla; Santiago Romero | Puerto Rico; Luis Bermúdez III; Migel Pizarro; Jesús Medero | Guadeloupe; Jacky Chinapayen; Pierre Bourgeois; Jérémy Tilot |

=== Women's events ===
| Event | Gold | Silver | Bronze |
|---|---|---|---|
| 10 m air rifle | Goretti Zumaya; Mexico | Gloria Rivas; Guatemala | Erendira Barba; Mexico |
| 10 m air rifle team | Mexico; Samantha Ortega; Eréndira Barba; Goretti Zumaya | Cuba; Dianelys Pérez; Erisnelki Cruz; Lisbet Hernández | Guatemala; Gloria Rivas; Jazmine Matta; Carmen Tiul |
| 50 m rifle 3 positions | Yarimar Mercado; Puerto Rico | Jazmine Matta; Guatemala | Erendira Barba; Mexico |
| 10 m air pistol | Jennifer Valentín; Puerto Rico | Andrea Ibarra; Mexico | Mía Rosales; Mexico |
| 10 m air pistol team | Mexico; Mía Rosales; Alejandra Zavala; Andrea Ibarra | Puerto Rico; Abigail Granell; Andrea Figueroa; Jennifer Valentín | Cuba; Laina Pérez; María Pérez González; Melany Abreus |
| 25 m pistol | Elba Vega; Mexico | Nicole Saavedra; Venezuela | Andrea Ibarra; Mexico |
| Trap | Alejandra Ramírez; Mexico | Cinthya Clemenz; Mexico | Ingrid Moueza; Guadeloupe |
| Skeet | Gabriela Rodríguez; Mexico | Emily Padilla; Guatemala | Anabel Molina; Mexico |

=== Mixed events ===
| Event | Gold | Silver | Bronze |
|---|---|---|---|
| 10 m air rifle team | Mexico; Eréndira Barba; Carlos Quezada | Guatemala; Gloria Rivas; Allan Márquez | Mexico; Goretti Zumaya; Edson Ramírez |
| 10 m air pistol team | Mexico; Alejandra Zavala; Daniel Urquiza | Mexico; Andrea Ibarra; David Valdez | Guatemala; Stefany Figueroa; Albino Jiménez |
| Trap team | Guatemala; Fernando Brol; Adriana Ruano | Guatemala; Jean Pierre Brol; Waleska Soto | Mexico; Jorge Orozco; Alejandra Ramírez |
