= Shooting at the 2023 Pan American Games – Women's 50 metre rifle three positions =

Women's 50 metre rifle three positions at the 2023 Pan American Games
- Venue: Polígono de tiro de Pudahuel
- Dates: October 27
- Competitors: 24 from 14 nations
- Winning score: 458.4

Medalists
Gold medal	Mary Tucker	United States
Silver medal	Sagen Maddalena	United States
Bronze medal	Shannon Westlake	Canada

The women's 50 metre rifle three positions is a competition in the shooting events at the 2023 Pan American Games which was held on October 25 at Polígono de tiro de Pudahuel Santiago, Chile.

== Schedule ==
Date	Time	Round
October 25, 2023	09:00	Qualification
October 25, 2023	11:30	Final

== Results ==
=== Qualification round ===
The highest eight scores advance to the final.

Rank	Athlete	Country	1	2	Sub Total	Total	Notes
1	Sagen Maddalena	United States	99; 100; 98	99; 100; 100	198; 200; 198	596-40x	Q, PR
2	Mary Tucker	United States	98; 100; 96	99; 99; 98	197; 199; 194	590-32x	Q
3	Sara Vizcarra	Peru	99; 99; 94	96; 99; 99	195; 198; 193	586-28x	Q
4	Yarimar Mercado	Puerto Rico	97; 100; 95	98; 100; 95	195; 200; 190	585-32x	Q
5	Andrea Palafox	Mexico	97; 100; 96	96; 98; 95	193; 198; 95	582-20x	Q
6	Geovana Meyer	Brazil	95; 99; 96	99; 98; 94	194; 197; 190	581-21x	Q
7	Shannon Westlake	Canada	98; 99; 95	96; 99; 92	194; 198; 187	579-26x	Q
8	Dianelys Pérez	Cuba	96; 96; 99	97; 98; 93	193; 194; 192	579-23x	Q
9	Polymaría Velásquez	Independent Athletes Team	97; 08; 92	96; 98; 95	193; 196; 187	576-24x	
10	Ana Ramírez	El Salvador	98; 98; 93	92; 99; 94	190; 197; 187	574-26x	
11	Lisbet Hernández	Cuba	94; 99; 90	97; 98; 94	191; 197; 184	572-21x	
12	Amelia Fournel	Argentina	92; 97; 95	94; 97; 96	186; 194; 191	571-21x	
13	María Lamarque	Argentina	92; 99; 94	95; 100; 89	187; 199; 183	569-17x	
14	Alexia Arenas	Peru	95; 93; 93	95; 96; 96	190; 189; 189	568-21x	
15	Johanna Pineda	El Salvador	91; 95; 94	94; 97; 94	185; 192; 188	565-10x	
16	Simone Prachthauser	Brazil	96; 97; 89	97; 97; 88	193; 194; 177	564-19x	
17	Michel Quezada	Mexico	89; 95; 93	94; 98; 95	183; 193; 188	564-12x	
18	Ana Cruz	Ecuador	95; 90; 90	99; 94; 95	194; 184; 185	563-19x	
19	Ingrid Vela	Independent Athletes Team	92; 94; 91	94; 95; 96	186; 189; 187	562-14x	
20	Gabriela Lobos	Chile	93; 97; 90	93; 98; 90	186; 195; 180	561-15x	
21	Karina Vera	Chile	92; 96; 92	90; 95; 94	182; 191; 186	559-14x	
22	Mariel López	Nicaragua	91; 93; 86	93; 99; 90	184; 192; 176	552-16x	
23	María Auxiliadora López	Nicaragua	91; 92; 88	94; 94; 90	185; 186; 178	549-12x	
24	Dairene Márquez	Venezuela	92; 93; 86	95; 92; 87	187; 185; 173	545-9x	

=== Final ===
The results were as follows:

Rank	Athlete	Country	1st Stage		2nd Stage						Total	Notes
1st place, gold medalist(s)	Mary Tucker	United States	154.5; 52.2; 51.7; 50.6	310.1; 51.1; 52.1; 52.4	410.1; 48.8; 51.2	419.2; 9.1	429.9; 10.7	439.8; 9.9	449.2; 9.4	9.2	458.4	FPR
2nd place, silver medalist(s)	Sagen Maddalena	United States	153.3; 51.0; 51.2; 51.1	309.2; 51.5; 52.0; 52.4	407.6; 49.2; 49.2	418.2; 10.6	428.1; 9.9	437.6; 9.5	447.7; 10.1	9.5	457.2	
3rd place, bronze medalist(s)	Shannon Westlake	Canada	154.6; 50.3; 52.4; 51.9	308.7; 50.7; 51.7; 51.7	406.4; 48.0; 49.7	416.5; 10.1	425.5; 9.0	436.4; 10.9	10.1		446.5	
4	Yarimar Mercado	Puerto Rico	152.4; 51.2; 50.4; 50.8	307.3; 52.3; 51.3; 51.3	407.7; 50.5; 49.9	416.4; 8.7	425.4; 9.0	9.9			435.3	
5	Geovana Meyer	Brazil	150.1; 51.6; 49.6; 48.9	304.5; 51.9; 51.3; 51.2	404.3; 49.5; 50.3	414.9; 10.6	9.5				424.4	
6	Dianelys Pérez	Cuba	148.0; 50.5; 49.6; 47.9	301.9; 50.4; 52.1; 51.4	401.3; 50.1; 49.3	10.1					411.4	
7	Andrea Palafox	Mexico	146.1; 49.4; 46.9; 49.8	298.2; 51.6; 50.8; 49.7	48.5; 48.0						394.7	
8	Sara Vizcarra	Peru	144.9; 45.5; 51.2; 48.2	295.5; 50.1; 49.7; 50.8	47.0; 47.2						389.7	
