= Shooting at the 2010 South American Games – Women's 50m rifle 3 positions =

The Women's 50m rifle 3 positions event at the 2010 South American Games was held on March 26, with the qualification at 9:00 and the Finals at 13:00.

== Individual ==
=== Medalists ===
Gold	Silver	Bronze
Amelia Fournel; Argentina	Cacilia Elena Zeid; Argentina	Karina Paola Loayza; Peru

=== Results ===
==== Qualification ====
Rank	Athlete	Prone			Standing			Kneeling			Total
Rank	Athlete	1	2	T	3	4	T	5	6	T	Total
1	Amelia Fournel (ARG)	97	96	'193	95	96	191	94	95	189	573
2	Cecilia Elena Zeid (ARG)	98	97	195	90	92	182	96	97	193	570
3	Karina Paola Loayza (PER)	96	95	191	93	92	185	96	94	190	566
4	Lidnimar Rebolledo (VEN)	96	97	193	88	84	172	93	94	187	552
5	Diana Cabrera (URU)	95	94	189	87	87	174	94	91	185	548
6	Diliana Méndez (VEN)	95	94	189	97	86	183	85	89	174	546
6	Karina Paola Cerpa (CHI)	94	97	191	86	89	191	92	88	180	546
8	Rosane Ewald (BRA)	94	97	191	85	87	172	86	89	175	538
9	Victoria Machado (BRA)	92	95	187	82	87	169	94	87	181	537
10	Angela Rodriguez (COL)	92	90	182	87	81	168	89	93	182	532
11	Silvia Alejandra Lopez (PER)	93	92	185	88	84	172	88	84	172	529
12	Milena Paternina (COL)	94	95	189	76	86	162	89	88	177	528
13	Gladys Ojeda (CHI)	92	95	187	82	82	164	89	86	175	526

==== Final ====
Rank	Athlete	Qual Score	Final Score	Total	Shoot-off
1st place, gold medalist(s)	Amelia Fournel (ARG)	573	95.5	668.5	
2nd place, silver medalist(s)	Cacilia Elena Zeid (ARG)	570	86.6	656.6	
3rd place, bronze medalist(s)	Karina Paola Loayza (PER)	566	84.6	650.6	
4	Diana Cabrera (URU)	548	92.1	640.1	
5	Diliana Méndez (VEN)	546	93.2	639.2	10.4
6	Lidnimar Rebolledo (VEN)	552	87.2	639.2	9.2
7	Karina Paola Cerpa (CHI)	546	90.0	636.0	
8	Rosane Ewald (BRA)	538	89.5	627.5	

== Team ==
=== Medalists ===
Gold	Silver	Bronze
Amelia Fournel; Cecilia Elena Zeid; Argentina	Lidnimar Rebolledo; Diliana Méndez; Venezuela	Karina Paola Loayza; Silvia Alejandra Lopez; Peru

=== Results ===
Rank	Athlete	Prone			Standing			Kneeling			Total
Rank	Athlete	1	2	T	3	4	T	5	6	T	Total
1st place, gold medalist(s)	Argentina										1143
1st place, gold medalist(s)	Amelia Fournel (ARG)	97	96	'193	95	96	191	94	95	189	573
1st place, gold medalist(s)	Cecilia Elena Zeid (ARG)	98	97	195	90	92	182	96	97	193	570
2nd place, silver medalist(s)	Venezuela										1098
2nd place, silver medalist(s)	Lidnimar Rebolledo (VEN)	96	97	193	88	84	172	93	94	187	552
2nd place, silver medalist(s)	Diliana Méndez (VEN)	95	94	189	97	86	183	85	89	174	546
3rd place, bronze medalist(s)	Peru										1095
3rd place, bronze medalist(s)	Karina Paola Loayza (PER)	96	95	191	93	92	185	96	94	190	566
3rd place, bronze medalist(s)	Silvia Alejandra Lopez (PER)	93	92	185	88	84	172	88	84	172	529
4	Brazil										1075
4	Rosane Ewald (BRA)	94	97	191	85	87	172	86	89	175	538
4	Victoria Machado (BRA)	92	95	187	82	87	169	94	87	181	537
5	Chile										1072
5	Karina Paola Cerpa (CHI)	94	97	191	86	89	191	92	88	180	546
5	Gladys Ojeda (CHI)	92	95	187	82	82	164	89	86	175	526
6	Colombia										1060
6	Angela Rodriguez (COL)	92	90	182	87	81	168	89	93	182	532
6	Milena Paternina (COL)	94	95	189	76	86	162	89	88	177	528
