= Shooting at the 2024 Summer Olympics – Women's 10 metre air rifle =

Women's 10 metre air rifle at the Games of the XXXIII Olympiad
- Venue: National Shooting Centre, Châteauroux
- Dates: 28–29 July
- Competitors: 44 from 31 nations

Medalists
1st place, gold medalist(s)		Ban Hyo-jin	South Korea
2nd place, silver medalist(s)		Huang Yuting	China
3rd place, bronze medalist(s)		Audrey Gogniat	Switzerland

The women's 10 metre air rifle event at the 2024 Summer Olympics took place on 28–29 July 2024 at the National Shooting Centre, Châteauroux in France.

== Records ==
Prior to this competition, the existing world and Olympic records were as follows:

Qualification records
World record	Han Jiayu (CHN)	636.3	Baku, Azerbaijan	5 May 2024
Olympic record	Jeanette Hegg Duestad (NOR)	632.9	Tokyo, Japan	24 July 2021

Final records
World record	Zifei Wang (CHN)	254.8	Lima, Peru	19 April 2025
Olympic record	Yang Qian (CHN)	251.8	Tokyo, Japan	24 July 2021

== Schedule ==
All times are Central European Summer Time (UTC+2)

Date	Time	Round
Sunday, 28 July 2024	09:15	Qualification
Monday, 29 July 2024	09:30	Final

== Results ==
=== Qualification ===
Rank	Shooter	Nation	1	2	3	4	5	6	Total	Notes
1	Ban Hyo-jin	South Korea	106.2	105.7	104.8	106.6	105.9	105.3	634.5	Q OR
2	Jeanette Hegg Duestad	Norway	106.4	106.4	106.0	103.6	105.2	105.6	633.2	Q
3	Audrey Gogniat	Switzerland	104.6	105.2	105.2	105.3	106.0	106.3	632.6	Q
4	Huang Yuting	China	104.5	106.1	104.6	105.3	106.0	106.1	632.6	Q
5	Ramita Jindal	India	104.3	106.0	104.9	105.3	105.3	105.7	631.5	Q
6	Alexandra Le	Kazakhstan	104.3	106.2	106.0	103.8	105.5	105.6	631.4	Q
7	Sagen Maddalena	United States	104.8	104.2	105.7	105.8	105.3	105.6	631.4	Q
8	Océanne Muller	France	106.1	105.1	105.9	105.0	105.4	103.8	631.3	Q
9	Keum Ji-hyeon	South Korea	105.1	104.7	105.2	105.9	105.2	104.8	630.9	
10	Elavenil Valarivan	India	105.8	106.1	104.4	105.3	105.3	103.8	630.7	
11	Shermineh Chehel Amirani	Iran	104.1	105.9	104.4	106.1	105.9	103.6	630.0	
12	Misaki Nobata	Japan	104.0	104.2	104.8	105.6	105.1	106.2	629.9	
13	Julia Piotrowska	Poland	105.8	104.4	103.9	105.1	104.7	105.4	629.3	
14	Synnøve Berg	Norway	104.8	105.1	104.1	105.6	105.4	104.2	629.2	
15	Eszter Mészáros	Hungary	105.7	105.0	105.8	103.1	104.2	104.8	628.6	
16	Han Jiayu	China	104.3	106.0	103.2	104.9	105.2	104.5	628.1	
17	Arina Altukhova	Kazakhstan	104.6	105.0	104.3	104.9	103.8	105.1	627.7	
18	Yesugen Oyunbat	Mongolia	104.4	102.9	106.5	103.8	106.1	103.9	627.6	
19	Anna Janssen	Germany	102.4	105.1	103.1	105.6	106.6	104.7	627.5	
20	Goretti Zumaya	Mexico	104.1	104.5	105.6	104.7	103.6	104.9	627.4	
21	Aneta Stankiewicz	Poland	104.7	104.7	105.5	104.3	104.3	103.9	627.4	
22	Rikke Ibsen	Denmark	104.1	105.5	105.0	104.0	103.9	104.8	627.3	
23	Nina Christen	Switzerland	102.7	105.6	105.8	104.3	104.7	104.0	627.1	
24	Barbara Gambaro	Italy	105.8	102.0	105.8	103.6	104.2	105.4	626.8	
25	Lisa Müller	Germany	104.4	103.6	105.0	103.3	105.9	104.3	626.5	
26	Fatemeh Amini	Iran	103.7	104.7	104.4	103.6	104.7	105.1	626.2	
27	Stephanie Grundsøe	Denmark	103.4	105.4	104.1	104.4	104.8	104.1	626.2	
28	Nadine Ungerank	Austria	103.4	106.2	104.3	105.7	104.6	101.9	626.1	
29	Remas Khalil	Egypt	105.1	102.7	102.6	104.9	105.3	104.9	625.5	
30	Fernanda Russo	Argentina	104.1	105.2	105.2	104.0	103.3	103.6	625.4	
31	Anastasija Mojsovska	North Macedonia	104.5	103.7	104.3	104.4	104.0	104.4	625.3	
32	Mary Tucker	United States	101.9	103.5	104.8	105.4	103.7	105.9	625.2	
33	Manon Herbulot	France	104.2	104.4	104.4	104.4	104.7	103.1	625.2	
34	Veronika Blažíčková	Czech Republic	103.0	105.3	104.0	104.4	104.5	103.9	625.1	
35	Mai Magdy Elsayed Abuqarn	Egypt	104.3	105.4	103.5	103.0	104.0	104.5	624.7	
36	Lisbet Hernández	Cuba	103.2	104.5	104.3	104.2	104.3	104.2	624.7	
37	Seonaid McIntosh	Great Britain	103.7	103.8	104.7	103.9	104.7	103.7	624.5	
38	Geovana Meyer	Brazil	103.5	105.2	103.9	105.4	104.0	101.5	623.5	
39	Yarimar Mercado	Puerto Rico	103.2	102.6	103.8	104.1	102.8	105.5	622.0	
40	Lê Thị Mộng Tuyền	Vietnam	102.6	103.9	102.7	103.4	103.6	104.9	621.1	
41	Mariel Jose López Pavón	Nicaragua	103.4	103.1	102.4	103.5	104.0	101.1	617.5	
42	Sushmita Nepal	Nepal	104.5	101.7	100.7	99.9	102.2	98.8	607.8	
43	Luna Solomon	Refugee Olympic Team	99.9	101.1	98.3	99.9	101.4	100.6	601.2	
	Houda Chaabi	Algeria	Did not start							

=== Final ===
Rank	Athlete	Nation	5	10	12	14	16	18	20	22	24	Total	Notes
1st place, gold medalist(s)	Ban Hyo-jin	South Korea	52.8	104.8	125.6	147.1	168.7	190.0	211.0	232.3	251.8	251.8(+10.4)	EOR + SO: 10.4
2nd place, silver medalist(s)	Huang Yuting	China	53.0	105.5	126.5	147.6	168.6	189.8	210.9	231.0	251.8	251.8(+10.3)	EOR + SO: 10.3
3rd place, bronze medalist(s)	Audrey Gogniat	Switzerland	52.9	104.6	125.3	146.4	167.6	188.5	209.1	230.3	—	230.3	
4	Sagen Maddalena	United States	52.3	104.3	124.7	145.9	167.1	187.5	207.7	—		207.7	
5	Océanne Muller	France	51.5	104.4	125.0	145.3	166.0	187.1	—			187.1	
6	Alexandra Le	Kazakhstan	52.0	104.1	125.2	145.4	165.4	—				165.4	
7	Ramita Jindal	India	52.5	104.0	124.9	145.3	—					145.3	SO
8	Jeanette Hegg Duestad	Norway	50.5	103.6	124.1	—						124.1	-
