= Shooting at the 2010 South American Games – Women's 50m rifle prone =

The Women's 50m rifle prone event at the 2010 South American Games was held on March 24 at 12:00.

== Individual ==
=== Medalists ===
Gold	Silver	Bronze
Marlil Luisa Romero; Venezuela	Maria de los Reyes Cardellino; Argentina	Diana Cabrera; Uruguay

=== Results ===
==== Final ====
Rank	Athlete	Series						Total
Rank	Athlete	1	2	3	4	5	6	Total
1st place, gold medalist(s)	Marlil Luisa Romero (VEN)	95	96	96	99	94	94	574
2nd place, silver medalist(s)	Maria de los Reyes Cardellino (ARG)	95	95	98	94	97	94	573
3rd place, bronze medalist(s)	Diana Cabrera (URU)	96	98	96	97	95	91	573
4	Wendy Daisy de la Cruz (BOL)	95	97	95	94	96	95	572
5	Diliana Méndez (VEN)	94	97	96	95	97	93	572
6	Rosane Ewald (BRA)	92	96	95	97	95	94	569
7	Andrea Alvarez (ARG)	99	95	91	97	93	94	569
8	Silvia Alejandra Lopez (PER)	92	96	92	96	96	94	566
9	Karina Paola Cerpa (CHI)	94	95	96	90	97	94	566
10	Angela Rodriguez (COL)	96	94	90	91	96	97	564
11	Milena Paternina (COL)	87	94	97	95	97	91	561
12	Karina Paola Loayza (PER)	94	86	96	95	91	92	554
13	Eliane Pietsak (BRA)	87	95	93	93	92	88	548
14	Carolina Aurora Caro (CHI)	96	88	88	92	90	87	541

== Team ==
=== Medalists ===
Gold	Silver	Bronze
Marlil Luisa Romero; Diliana Méndez; Venezuela	Maria de los Reyes Cardellino; Andrea Alvarez; Argentina	Angela Rodriguez; RosMilena Paternina; Colombia

=== Results ===
Rank	Athlete	Series						Total
Rank	Athlete	1	2	3	4	5	6	Total
1st place, gold medalist(s)	Venezuela							1146
1st place, gold medalist(s)	Marlil Luisa Romero (VEN)	95	96	96	99	94	94	574
1st place, gold medalist(s)	Diliana Méndez (VEN)	94	97	96	95	97	93	572
2nd place, silver medalist(s)	Argentina							1142
2nd place, silver medalist(s)	Maria de los Reyes Cardellino (ARG)	95	95	98	94	97	94	573
2nd place, silver medalist(s)	Andrea Alvarez (ARG)	99	95	91	97	93	94	569
3rd place, bronze medalist(s)	Colombia							1125
3rd place, bronze medalist(s)	Angela Rodriguez (COL)	96	94	90	91	96	97	564
3rd place, bronze medalist(s)	Milena Paternina (COL)	87	94	97	95	97	91	561
4	Peru							1120
4	Silvia Alejandra Lopez (PER)	92	96	92	96	96	94	566
4	Karina Paola Loayza (PER)	94	86	96	95	91	92	554
5	Brazil							1117
5	Rosane Ewald (BRA)	92	96	95	97	95	94	569
5	Eliane Pietsak (BRA)	87	95	93	93	92	88	548
6	Chile							1107
6	Karina Paola Cerpa (CHI)	94	95	96	90	97	94	566
6	Carolina Aurora Caro (CHI)	96	88	88	92	90	87	541
