= Shooting at the 2023 Pan American Games – Women's 10 metre air rifle =

Women's 10 metre air rifle at the 2023 Pan American Games
- Venue: Polígono de tiro de Pudahuel
- Dates: October 21
- Competitors: 26 from 14 nations
- Winning score: 249.5

Medalists
Gold medal	Sagen Maddalena	United States
Silver medal	Fernanda Russo	Argentina
Bronze medal	Mary Tucker	United States

The women's 10 metre air rifle competition of the shooting events at the 2023 Pan American Games was held on October 21 at Polígono de tiro de Pudahuel in Santiago, Chile.

== Schedule ==
Date	Time	Round
October 21, 2023	09:00	Qualification
October 21, 2023	13:30	Final

== Results ==
=== Qualification round ===
The highest scores advance to the final.

Rank	Athlete	Country	1	2	3	4	5	6	Total	Notes
1	Sagen Magdalena	United States	104.9	105.9	105.2	105.4	104.9	105.6	631.9	Q, QPR
2	Mary Tucker	United States	106.0	104.0	105.2	104.5	105.3	105.2	630.2	Q
3	Alison Weisz	United States	104.4	103.5	104.6	103.6	104.4	105.4	625.9	Q
4	Goretti Zumaya	Mexico	105.2	106.0	104.5	104.6	103.5	101.2	625.0	Q
5	Fernanda Russo	Argentina	105.4	102.8	104.7	103.7	104.2	103.5	624.3	Q
6	Yarimar Mercado	Puerto Rico	104.0	102.9	103.2	103.7	103.5	106.0	623.3	Q
7	Geovana Meyer	Brazil	102.1	103.6	105.4	102.9	105.0	104.0	623.0	Q
8	Alexia Arenas	Peru	104.1	103.1	104.3	103.5	103.8	103.2	622.0	Q
9	Jasmine Matta	Independent Athletes Team	102.9	103.6	103.4	103.4	104.5	103.2	621.0	
10	Lisbet Hernández	Cuba	103.8	103.3	104.7	102.2	102.6	104.1	620.7	
11	Adianez Martínez	Cuba	103.4	104.6	102.1	102.6	105.3	101.7	619.7	
12	Sara Vizcarra	Peru	102.7	106.2	101.6	105.3	103.3	99.9	619.0	
13	Polymaría Velásquez	Independent Athletes Team	103.1	102.4	104.1	101.8	102.3	104.4	618.1	
14	Aleandra Robinson	Puerto Rico	103.3	103.1	102.7	101.5	103.2	103.8	617.6	
15	Gladys Aguilera	Chile	101.4	101.4	103.2	103.7	102.3	103.1	615.1	
16	Luisa Marquez	Mexico	101.1	103.2	103.9	102.0	103.0	101.3	614.5	
17	Ana Cruz	Ecuador	101.7	101.6	103.1	102.9	102.3	102.3	613.9	
18	Lola Sánchez	Argentina	102.8	102.4	102.2	101.3	104.5	99.8	613.0	
19	Ana Ramírez	El Salvador	103.5	103.8	102.1	100.0	99.6	102.2	611.2	
20	Selenia Ledezma	Bolivia	100.1	103.1	100.2	102.6	101.8	101.9	609.7	
21	Allison Aguilera	Chile	99.6	100.7	100.4	103.6	103.0	101.6	608.9	
22	Simone Prachthauser	Brazil	100.5	100.0	99.7	104.5	101.3	101.0	607.0	
23	Mariel Lopéz	Nicaragua	100.6	102.3	100.5	99.5	101.2	101.4	605.5	
24	Johanna Pineda	El Salvador	98.2	101.3	103.2	101.5	102.0	99.0	605.2	
25	María Auxiliadora López	Nicaragua	100.3	98.6	100.1	101.1	100.7	102.7	603.5	
26	Dairene Márquez	Venezuela	90.4	95.2	96.9	101.2	98.5	95.0	577.2	

=== Final ===
Rank	Athlete	Country	1st Stage		2nd Stage							Total	Notes
1st place, gold medalist(s)	Sagen Magdalena	United States	51.2; 10.6; 10.2; 10.3; 10.0; 10.1	103.7; 10.9; 10.6; 10.5; 10.2; 10.3	124.3; 10.2; 10.4	145.7; 10.6; 10.8	166.2; 10.4; 10.1	187.2; 10.6; 10.4	207.9; 10.6; 10.1	228.8; 10.5; 10.4	10.8; 9.9	249.5	FPR
2nd place, silver medalist(s)	Fernanda Russo	Argentina	52.3; 10.7; 10.6; 10.3; 10.0; 10.7	102.2; 9.3; 10.6; 10.1; 9.3; 10.6	123.3; 10.8; 10.3	143.0; 9.8; 9.9	164.2; 10.7; 10.5	185.7; 10.2; 10.3	206.2; 10.2; 103	226.8; 10.7; 9.9	10.5; 10.7	248.0	
3rd place, bronze medalist(s)	Mary Tucker	United States	51.4; 9.9; 10.5; 10.0; 10.6; 10.4	103.6; 10.2; 10.8; 10.4; 10.2; 10.6	124.3; 10.9; 9.8	144.9; 10.3; 10.3	164.9; 10.0; 9.9	186.4; 10.7; 10.9	206.9; 10.4; 10.1	9.4; 10.0		226.3	
4	Alison Weisz	United States	51.3; 10.2; 10.4; 10.7; 10.3; 9.7	103.2; 10.5; 10.2; 10.3; 10.4; 10.5	124.1; 10.5; 10.4	145.2; 10.4; 10.7	165.2; 9.3; 10.7	185.6; 10.1; 10.3	9.8; 10.2			205.6	
5	Goretti Zumaya	Mexico	49.9; 10.0; 10.0; 9.5; 10.0; 10.4	102.3; 10.5; 10.8; 10.7; 10.1; 10.3	122.5; 10.1; 10.1	143.3; 10.8; 10.0	164.4; 10.8; 10.3	9.6; 10.5				184.5	
6	Geovana Meyer	Brazil	50.2; 9.7; 10.0; 10.5; 9.9; 10.1	100.6; 10.1; 9.7; 10.2; 10.5; 9.9	121.1; 10.0; 10.5	141.9; 10.6; 10.2	9.6; 10.4					161.9	S-off:10.4
7	Alexia Arenas	Peru	51.6; 10.2; 9.8; 10.4; 10.6; 10.6	101.3; 10.0; 10.4; 9.6; 9.4; 10.3	120.6; 9.9; 9.4	10.8; 10.5						141.9	SO, S-off:9.8
8	Yarimar Mercado	Puerto Rico	51.1; 10.4; 10.1; 9.7; 10.0; 10.9	98.5; 9.1; 9.5; 10.6; 8.0; 10.1	10.5; 10.6							119.6	
