= Shooting at the 2023 Pan American Games – Mixed pairs air rifle =

Mixed pairs air rifle at the 2023 Pan American Games
- Venue: Polígono de tiro de Pudahuel
- Dates: October 23
- Competitors: 38 from 10 nations

Medalists
Gold medal	Mary Tucker; Rylan Kissell	United States
Silver medal	Goretti Zumaya; Edson Ramirez	Mexico
Bronze medal	Sagen Maddalena; Gavin Barnick	United States

The mixed pairs air rifle competition of the shooting events at the 2023 Pan American Games was held on October 23 at Polígono de tiro de Pudahuel Santiago, Chile.

== Schedule ==
Date	Time	Round
October 23, 2023	09:00	Qualification
October 23, 2023	10:00	Bronze medal match
October 23, 2023	10:30	Gold medal match

== Results ==
=== Qualification round ===
The first and second place advance to the gold medal match while the third and fourth place advance to the bronze medal match.

Rank	Athletes	Country	1	2	3	Total	Notes
1	Mary Tucker; Rylan Kissell	United States	210.7; 105.8; 104.9	210.2; 106.0; 104.2	209.2; 104.4; 104.8	630.1; 316.2; 313.9	QG
2	Goretti Zumaya; Edson Ramirez	Mexico	210.0; 104.9; 105.1	208.9; 104.8; 104.1	209.5; 104.6; 104.9	628.4; 314.3; 314.1	QG
3	Luisa Márquez; Carlos Quezada	Mexico	206.8; 104.4; 102.4	207.5; 102.8; 104.7	208.3; 104.7; 103.6	622.6; 311.9; 310.7	QB
4	Sagen Maddalena; Gavin Barnick	United States	207.9; 104.2; 103.7	206.1; 103.1; 103.0	207.8; 104.5; 103.3	621.8; 311.8; 310.0	QB
5	Lola Sánchez; Marcelo Gutiérrez	Argentina	206.9; 102.7; 104.2	204.9; 103.6; 101.3	207.7; 102.8; 104.9	619.5; 309.1; 310.4	
6	Fernanda Russo; Alexis Eberhardt	Argentina	205.3; 101.9; 103.4	207.7; 104.8; 102.9	206.0; 103.0; 103.0	619.0; 309.7; 309.3	
7	Jasmine Matta; Douglas Oliva	Independent Athletes Team	208.6; 105.9; 102.7	206.4; 103.2; 103.2	203.9; 103.1; 100.8	618.9; 312.2; 306.7	
8	Alexia Arenas; Diego Morín	Peru	207.8; 103.7; 104.1	206.5; 103.4; 103.1	203.8; 102.0; 101.8	618.1; 309.1; 309.0	
9	Polymaría Velásquez; Allan Márquez	Independent Athletes Team	205.7; 101.4; 104.3	204.6; 103.6; 101.0	206.6; 104.3; 102.3	619.9; 309.3; 307.6	
10	Sara Vizcarra; Cristian Morales	Peru	205.1; 100.7; 104.4	205.8; 102.8; 103.0	205.9; 103.2; 102.7	616.8; 306.7; 310.1	
11	Yarimar Mercado; Gustavo Enríquez	Puerto Rico	202.2; 101.2; 101.0	205.8; 103.6; 102.2	208.1; 103.4; 104.7	616.1; 308.2; 307.9	
12	Aleandra Robinson; Eyvin López	Puerto Rico	202.6; 103.6; 99.0	206.3; 102.3; 104.0	206.3; 103.9; 102.4	615.2; 309.8; 305.4	
13	Johanna Pineda; Israel Gutiérrez	El Salvador	202.9; 100.3; 102.6	203.4; 99.7; 103.7	207.0; 103.0; 104.0	613.3; 303.0; 310.3	
14	Ana Ramírez; Diego Santamaría	El Salvador	203.8; 99.6; 104.2	203.5; 99.5; 104.0	205.4; 102.9; 102.5	612.7; 302.0; 310.7	
15	Adianez Martínez; Rainier Quintanilla	Cuba	206.3; 102.7; 103.6	203.9; 100.8; 103.1	202.3; 100.5; 101.8	612.5; 304.0; 308.5	
16	Allison Aguilera; Daniel Vidal	Chile	203.1; 101.7; 101.4	203.7; 101.5; 102.2	205.0; 102.8; 102.2	611.8; 306.0; 305.8	
17	Lisbet Hernández; Alexander Molerio	Cuba	201.8; 100.8; 101.0	204.7; 102.6; 102.1	205.2; 103.5; 101.7	611.7; 306.9; 304.8	
18	Gladys Aguilera; Daniel Vidal	Chile	202.4; 101.3	200.4; 100.6	205.3; 103.1	608.1; 305.0	
19	Ana Cruz; Milton Machado	Ecuador	199.6; 102.5; 97.1	200.5; 102.1; 98.4	205.8; 103.0; 102.8	605.9; 307.6; 298.3	

=== Final ===
The results were as follows:

=== Bronze medal match ===
Rank	Athletes	Country	Total	Notes
3rd place, bronze medalist(s)	Sagen Maddalena; Gavin Barnick	United States	16	
4	Luisa Márquez; Carlos Quezada	Mexico	6	

=== Gold medal match ===
Rank	Athletes	Country	Total	Notes
1st place, gold medalist(s)	Mary Tucker; Rylan Kissell	United States	16	
2nd place, silver medalist(s)	Goretti Zumaya; Edson Ramirez	Mexico	10	
