= Shooting at the 2022 Asian Games – Mixed 10 metre air rifle team =

Mixed 10 metre air rifle team at the 2022 Asian Games
- Venue: Fuyang Yinhu Sports Centre
- Dates: 26 September 2023
- Competitors: 42 from 21 nations

Medalists
gold medal	Sheng Lihao; Huang Yuting	China
silver medal	Javokhir Sokhibov; Mukhtasar Tokhirova	Uzbekistan
bronze medal	Islam Satpayev; Alexandra Le	Kazakhstan
bronze medal	Park Ha-jun; Lee Eun-seo	South Korea

The mixed 10 metre air rifle team competition at the 2022 Asian Games in Hangzhou, China was held on 26 September 2023 at Fuyang Yinhu Sports Centre.

== Schedule ==
All times are China Standard Time (UTC+08:00)

Date	Time	Event
Tuesday, 26 September 2023	09:00	Qualification
Tuesday, 26 September 2023	10:45	Bronze medal matches
Tuesday, 26 September 2023	11:35	Gold medal match

== Records ==
Prior to this competition, the existing world, Asian and Games records were as follows.

World Record	India	635.8	Cairo, Egypt	20 February 2023
Asian Record	India	635.8	Cairo, Egypt	20 February 2023
Games Record	—	—	—	—

== Results ==
=== Qualification ===
Rank	Team	Series			Total	Notes
Rank	Team	1	2	3	Total	Notes
1	China (CHN)	212.0	210.7	211.7	634.4	GR
	Sheng Lihao	106.6	106.4	106.3	319.3	
	Huang Yuting	105.4	104.3	105.4	315.1	
2	Uzbekistan (UZB)	209.3	210.8	210.2	630.3	
	Javokhir Sokhibov	104.8	106.0	103.6	314.4	
	Mukhtasar Tokhirova	104.5	104.8	106.6	315.9	
3	South Korea (KOR)	210.5	210.5	208.6	629.6	
	Park Ha-jun	105.4	105.9	104.6	315.9	
	Lee Eun-seo	105.1	104.6	104.0	313.7	
4	Kazakhstan (KAZ)	209.2	209.9	210.2	629.3	
	Islam Satpayev	103.5	104.1	105.6	313.2	
	Alexandra Le	105.7	105.8	104.6	316.1	
5	Iran (IRI)	209.5	208.9	210.6	629.0	
	Amir Mohammad Nekounam	105.2	104.0	105.7	314.9	
	Shermineh Chehel-Amirani	104.3	104.9	104.9	314.1	
6	India (IND)	208.8	207.5	211.9	628.2	
	Divyansh Singh Panwar	104.3	104.0	106.0	314.3	
	Ramita Jindal	104.5	103.5	105.9	313.9	
7	Singapore (SGP)	211.2	207.7	208.0	626.9	
	Tang Hong An	104.6	103.2	103.5	311.3	
	Fernel Tan	106.6	104.5	104.5	315.6	
8	Mongolia (MGL)	208.2	207.7	210.4	626.3	
	Nyantain Bayaraa	104.8	104.8	105.0	314.6	
	Oyuunbatyn Yesügen	103.4	102.9	105.4	311.7	
9	Bangladesh (BAN)	209.0	208.9	207.9	625.8	
	Robiul Islam	104.3	103.8	103.4	311.5	
	Shaira Arefin	104.7	105.1	104.5	314.3	
10	Bahrain (BRN)	207.4	209.1	208.7	625.2	
	Khaled Mohamed Al-Doseri	103.6	105.0	103.9	312.5	
	Safa Al-Doseri	103.8	104.1	104.8	312.7	
11	Japan (JPN)	209.0	208.6	207.5	625.1	
	Masaya Endo	105.6	105.0	103.6	314.2	
	Shiori Hirata	103.4	103.6	103.9	310.9	
12	Thailand (THA)	207.3	206.0	209.6	622.9	
	Napis Tortungpanich	103.3	103.2	104.9	311.4	
	Chanittha Sastwej	104.0	102.8	104.7	311.5	
13	Oman (OMA)	207.6	208.5	206.5	622.6	
	Issam Al-Balushi	103.9	104.7	103.8	312.4	
	Siham Al-Hasani	103.7	103.8	102.7	310.2	
14	Indonesia (INA)	205.5	209.7	207.1	622.3	
	Fathur Gustafian	103.5	104.3	105.4	313.2	
	Amelia Sifaul Citra	102.0	105.4	101.7	309.1	
15	United Arab Emirates (UAE)	204.3	208.6	207.7	620.6	
	Ibrahim Khalil	103.3	104.3	103.7	311.3	
	Yasmin Tahlak	101.0	104.3	104.0	309.3	
16	Chinese Taipei (TPE)	207.1	205.9	206.0	619.0	
	Lu Shao-chuan	103.5	103.2	100.8	307.5	
	Lin Ying-shin	103.6	102.7	105.2	311.5	
17	Malaysia (MAS)	205.4	206.8	206.2	618.4	
	Haritz Iklil Hessly Hafiz	102.7	103.3	104.1	310.1	
	Nur Suryani Taibi	102.7	103.5	102.1	308.3	
18	Pakistan (PAK)	204.4	205.2	208.0	617.6	
	Ghufran Adil	103.1	102.3	103.5	308.9	
	Mehak Fatima	101.3	102.9	104.5	308.7	
19	Philippines (PHI)	202.9	204.1	206.5	613.5	
	Jayson Valdez	99.5	101.2	101.7	302.4	
	Amparo Acuña	103.4	102.9	104.8	311.1	
20	Qatar (QAT)	204.3	205.7	202.9	612.9	
	Ali Al-Muhannadi	103.6	103.2	101.8	308.6	
	Matara Al-Aseiri	100.7	102.5	101.1	304.3	
21	Maldives (MDV)	204.1	202.4	194.4	600.9	
	Shifan Ibrahim	101.9	99.5	96.1	297.5	
	Sharafiyya Abdul Rahman	102.2	102.9	98.3	303.4	

=== Finals ===
==== Bronze medal match 1 ====
Team	Score	1	2	3	4	5	6	7	8	9	10	11	12	13	14
Kazakhstan (KAZ)	17	20.1	20.6	20.9	21.2	19.9	21.4	21.1	21.2	20.6	20.6	20.5	21.2	19.7	21.3
Islam Satpayev		10.3	9.8	10.1	10.6	10.5	10.8	10.5	10.6	10.5	10.8	10.1	10.4	9.6	10.8
Alexandra Le		9.8	10.8	10.8	10.6	9.4	10.6	10.6	10.6	10.1	9.8	10.4	10.8	10.1	10.5
Iran (IRI)	11	21.0	20.3	20.7	21.6	20.3	20.3	20.7	21.0	20.7	20.2	20.5	20.3	20.6	20.4
Amir Mohammad Nekounam		10.4	10.6	10.7	10.8	10.6	9.9	10.4	10.5	10.7	9.8	9.9	10.5	9.8	10.2
Shermineh Chehel-Amirani		10.6	9.7	10.0	10.8	9.7	10.4	10.3	10.5	10.0	10.4	10.6	9.8	10.8	10.2

==== Bronze medal match 2 ====
Team	Score	1	2	3	4	5	6	7	8	9	10	11	12	13	14	15	16	17	18	19
South Korea (KOR)	20	20.7	20.7	20.8	20.7	21.7	20.8	21.5	21.3	21.0	20.7	20.2	21.3	20.7	21.6	21.1	21.0	21.0	20.9	21.5
Park Ha-jun		10.1	10.3	10.3	10.1	10.8	10.8	10.8	10.7	10.6	10.4	10.2	10.4	10.7	10.9	10.7	10.4		10.0	
Lee Eun-seo		10.6	10.4	10.5	10.6	10.9	10.0	10.7	10.6	10.4	10.3	10.0	10.9	10.0	10.7	10.4	10.6		10.9	
India (IND)	18	21.1	21.2	21.0	21.1	20.5	20.8	20.7	20.9	19.9	20.8	21.5	21.1	21.2	21.2	20.7	21.0	21.0	20.9	21.2
Divyansh Singh Panwar		10.8	10.7	10.5	10.3	10.4	10.3	9.9	10.3	9.8	10.3	10.7	10.5	10.5	10.7	10.6	10.2		10.1	
Ramita Jindal		10.3	10.5	10.5	10.8	10.1	10.5	10.8	10.6	10.1	10.5	10.8	10.6	10.7	10.5	10.1	10.8		10.8	

==== Gold medal match ====
Team	Score	1	2	3	4	5	6	7	8	9
China (CHN)	16	21.4	21.3	20.7	21.5	20.8	21.0	21.4	21.2	20.8
Sheng Lihao		10.8	10.7	10.4	10.7	10.3	10.6	10.8	10.7	10.6
Huang Yuting		10.6	10.6	10.3	10.8	10.5	10.4	10.6	10.5	10.2
Uzbekistan (UZB)	2	21.3	20.5	20.7	20.5	20.3	20.2	20.6	20.8	20.8
Javokhir Sokhibov		10.7	10.4	10.2	10.4	10.1	9.9	10.3	10.4	10.2
Mukhtasar Tokhirova		10.6	10.1	10.5	10.1	10.2	10.3	10.3	10.4	10.6
