= Shooting at the 2023 Pan American Games – Men's 10 metre air rifle =

Men's 10 metre air rifle at the 2023 Pan American Games
- Venue: Polígono de tiro de Pudahuel
- Dates: October 21
- Competitors: 26 from 14 nations
- Winning score: 245.5

Medalists
Gold medal	Edson Ramirez	Mexico
Silver medal	Rylan Kissell	United States
Bronze medal	Cristian Morales	Peru

The men's 10 metre air rifle competition of the shooting events at the 2023 Pan American Games was held on October 21 at Polígono de tiro de Pudahuel Santiago, Chile.

== Schedule ==
Date	Time	Round
October 21, 2023	11:00	Qualification
October 21, 2023	14:30	Final

== Results ==
=== Qualification round ===
The highest scores advance to the final.

Rank	Athlete	Country	1	2	3	4	5	6	Total	Notes
1	Edson Ramirez	Mexico	104.8	106.3	105.7	104.8	105.7	105.1	632.4	Q, QPR
2	Rylan Kissell	United States	103.6	104.2	104.1	105.2	104.7	104.7	626.5	Q
3	Marcelo Gutiérrez	Argentina	104.1	104.3	104.0	104.5	103.4	104.6	624.9	Q
4	Gavin Barnick	United States	104.4	103.1	104.7	104.0	104.5	103.9	624.6	Q
5	Carlos Quezada	Mexico	104.8	105.1	102.6	103.5	103.2	104.1	623.3	Q
6	Alexis Eberhardt	Argentina	101.3	103.5	104.7	105.6	103.3	104.6	623.0	Q
7	Cristian Morales	Peru	101.5	104.2	104.4	100.1	104.7	103.6	618.5	Q
8	Julio Iemma	Venezuela	103.0	103.0	104.0	103.0	102.9	102.2	618.1	Q
9	Douglas Oliva	Independent Athletes Team	103.5	103.4	102.6	102.5	104.3	101.5	617.8	
10	Timothy Sherry	United States	103.3	103.5	103.1	100.7	104.0	102.4	617.0	
11	Israel Gutierrez	El Salvador	101.7	102.7	103.5	102.1	104.1	102.5	616.6	
12	Diego Morín	Peru	102.5	102.6	103.1	102.2	103.7	102.0	616.1	
13	Daniel Vidal	Chile	102.5	102.8	103.3	102.8	102.5	101.8	615.7	
14	Rainier Quintanilla	Cuba	101.4	100.4	103.9	104.5	102.0	102.9	615.1	
15	Allan Márquez	Independent Athletes Team	103.9	100.9	102.9	101.5	103.1	102.4	614.7	
16	Anyelo Parada	Chile	102.0	100.1	103.0	103.0	103.6	102.3	614.0	
17	Milton Camacho	Ecuador	99.7	102.7	102.5	102.7	104.7	101.5	613.8	
18	Gustavo Enríquez	Puerto Rico	102.4	102.3	102.2	102.3	100.8	103.4	613.4	
19	Alexander Molerio	Cuba	101.6	100.2	101.8	104.8	102.5	102.0	612.9	
20	Tye Ikeda	Canada	100.3	100.1	102.2	104.7	101.3	103.6	612.2	
21	Diego Santamaria	El Salvador	102.2	103.3	102.7	100.9	101.9	101.2	612.2	
22	Rudi Lausarot	Uruguay	102.6	102.6	100.2	101.7	102.2	101.9	611.2	
23	Eyvin López	Puerto Rico	100.0	103.3	100.9	102.2	103.2	100.6	610.2	
24	Cassio De Mello	Brazil	101.3	102.6	100.9	101.4	101.4	100.4	608.0	
25	Eduardo Sampaio	Brazil	100.9	100.1	100.8	101.8	102.7	101.4	607.7	
26	Jhon Hurtado	Ecuador	99.9	97.1	100.0	98.6	98.2	98.1	591.9	

=== Final ===
Rank	Athlete	Country	1st Stage		2nd Stage							Total	Notes
1st place, gold medalist(s)	Edson Ramirez	Mexico	50.7; 10.8; 9.9; 10.3; 9.5; 10.2	101.9; 10.0; 10.1; 9.8; 10.8; 10.5	122.7; 10.4; 10.4	143.0; 9.9; 10.4	164.1; 10.4; 10.7	184.8; 10.4; 10.3	205.2; 10.1; 10.3	225.5; 10.5; 9.8	10.8; 9.2	245.5	
2nd place, silver medalist(s)	Rylan Kissell	United States	51.4; 10.8; 10.1; 10.8; 9.5; 10.2	103.5; 10.4; 10.9; 10.5; 10.3; 10.0	124.7; 10.6; 10.6	145.3; 10.6; 10.0	165.9; 10.6; 10.0	185.6; 9.2; 10.5	206.0; 10.1; 10.3	226.2; 10.3; 9.9	10.5; 8.7	245.4	
3rd place, bronze medalist(s)	Cristian Morales	Peru	50.0; 10.0; 9.8; 9.8; 10.3; 10.1	101.6; 10.5; 9.7; 10.7; 10.3; 10.4	123.2; 10.7; 10.9	144.0; 10.4; 10.4	164.3; 10.1; 10.2	184.8; 10.2; 10.3	205.5; 10.5; 10.2	10.4; 9.2		225.1	
4	Carlos Quezada	Mexico	50.8; 10.5; 10.8; 9.1; 10.3; 10.1	102.0; 10.4; 10.4; 9.7; 10.5; 10.2	122.7; 10.7; 10.0	143.8; 10.5; 10.2	164.2; 10.2; 10.2	183.8; 10.2; 9.4	10.7; 10.3			204.8	
5	Gavin Barnick	United States	51.3; 10.4; 9.5; 10.8; 10.6; 10.0	103.2; 10.5; 9.8; 10.8; 10.3; 10.5	124.1; 10.3; 10.6	144.1; 9.7; 10.3	164.3; 9.8; 10.4	9.9; 9.3				183.5	
6	Alexis Eberhardt	Argentina	50.5; 10.4; 9.8; 9.9; 10.1; 10.3	102.0; 10.2; 10.1; 10.4; 10.6; 10.2	122.6; 10.3; 10.3	143.7; 10.8; 10.3	10.5; 9.8					164.0	
7	Marcelo Gutiérrez	Argentina	50.3; 10.4; 10.0; 10.3; 9.9; 9.7	101.6; 10.3; 10.2; 10.7; 10.4; 9.7	121.8; 9.5; 10.7							141.9	
8	Julio Iemma	Venezuela	50.1; 10.2; 9.9; 10.1; 10.1; 9.8	100.8; 9.6; 10.9; 9.8; 9.9; 10.5	10.1; 10.1							121.0	
