= Shooting at the 2022 Asian Games – Women's 10 metre air rifle =

Women's 10 metre air rifle at the 2022 Asian Games
- Venue: Fuyang Yinhu Sports Centre
- Dates: 24 September 2023
- Competitors: 62 from 27 nations

Medalists
gold medal	Huang Yuting	China
silver medal	Han Jiayu	China
bronze medal	Ramita Jindal	India

The women's 10 metre air rifle competition at the 2022 Asian Games in Hangzhou, China was held on 24 September 2023 at Fuyang Yinhu Sports Centre. Huang Yuting of China won the gold medal.

== Schedule ==
All times are China Standard Time (UTC+08:00)

Date	Time	Event
Sunday, 24 September 2023	08:30	Qualification
Sunday, 24 September 2023	11:45	Final

== Records ==
Prior to this competition, the existing world, Asian and Games records were as follows.

Qualification
World Record	Alison Weisz (USA)	635.3	Lima, Peru	8 November 2022
Asian Record	Zhao Ruozhu (CHN)	634.0	New Delhi, India	23 February 2019
Games Record	Zhao Ruozhu (CHN)	631.9	Palembang, Indonesia	20 August 2018
Final
World Record	Han Jiayu (CHN)	254.0	Baku, Azerbaijan	12 May 2023
Asian Record	Apurvi Chandela (IND)	252.9	New Delhi, India	23 February 2019
Games Record	Zhao Ruozhu (CHN)	250.9	Palembang, Indonesia	20 August 2018

== Results ==
Legend

- DNS — Did not start

=== Qualification ===
Rank	Athlete	Series						Total	Notes
Rank	Athlete	1	2	3	4	5	6	Total	Notes
1	Han Jiayu (CHN)	105.8	104.3	106.0	106.2	105.7	106.1	634.1	GR
2	Ramita Jindal (IND)	104.3	106.7	105.2	104.3	105.4	106.0	631.9	
3	Huang Yuting (CHN)	105.8	104.7	104.1	105.5	106.5	105.0	631.6	
4	Wang Zhilin (CHN)	104.6	103.8	106.5	105.6	105.3	105.1	630.9	
5	Mehuli Ghosh (IND)	104.6	105.7	104.6	105.1	104.9	105.9	630.8	
6	Lee Eun-seo (KOR)	105.2	104.7	106.0	104.0	104.7	105.9	630.5	
7	Gankhuyagiin Nandinzayaa (MGL)	106.1	106.0	104.8	104.7	104.4	104.2	630.2	
8	Chen Chi (TPE)	104.0	105.2	105.6	104.6	104.3	105.4	629.1	
9	Oyuunbatyn Yesügen (MGL)	104.2	104.5	104.4	106.0	105.0	104.8	628.9	
10	Fernel Tan (SGP)	104.9	105.0	105.2	104.4	105.4	103.9	628.8	
11	Shermineh Chehel-Amirani (IRI)	104.0	103.7	106.6	104.6	104.5	105.2	628.6	
12	Yelizaveta Bezrukova (KAZ)	104.2	105.2	104.4	104.0	104.6	105.6	628.0	
13	Shaira Arefin (BAN)	105.2	104.7	106.5	103.6	103.9	104.1	628.0	
14	Mukhtasar Tokhirova (UZB)	105.5	103.9	105.0	105.7	104.4	103.4	627.9	
15	Aruuke Talantbekova (KGZ)	104.5	103.6	106.3	103.0	104.3	105.3	627.0	
16	Lê Thị Mộng Tuyền (VIE)	104.2	104.8	103.9	103.6	105.0	105.4	626.9	
17	Elaheh Ahmadi (IRI)	105.0	105.2	102.5	103.9	105.2	105.1	626.9	
18	Lin Ying-shin (TPE)	105.3	105.2	104.1	103.6	104.5	103.5	626.2	
19	Alexandra Le (KAZ)	105.1	104.3	105.4	103.2	104.1	104.0	626.1	
20	Martina Veloso (SGP)	104.2	103.8	105.4	104.7	103.4	104.5	626.0	
21	Nguyễn Thị Thảo (VIE)	103.0	104.9	104.3	104.9	104.7	104.1	625.9	
22	Shiori Hirata (JPN)	103.8	104.6	104.2	103.7	104.1	105.3	625.7	
23	Anora Lagutenko (TJK)	103.0	104.2	104.3	103.3	104.8	106.0	625.6	
24	Chanittha Sastwej (THA)	103.9	103.1	104.6	105.9	104.4	103.2	625.1	
25	Nafisha Tabasum (BAN)	104.1	104.7	105.2	103.0	103.3	104.4	624.7	
26	Phí Thanh Thảo (VIE)	103.2	103.9	104.5	106.0	103.6	102.3	623.5	
27	Kamrun Nahar Koly (BAN)	104.4	103.4	104.7	103.3	102.9	104.6	623.3	
28	Ashi Chouksey (IND)	103.2	104.5	104.9	104.8	102.5	103.4	623.3	
29	Masayyu Putri Fadillah (INA)	105.0	104.1	103.6	103.5	103.7	102.9	622.8	
30	Jang Jeong-in (KOR)	102.6	100.8	106.0	104.1	105.3	103.6	622.4	
31	Eunice Leow (SGP)	102.9	103.1	104.1	103.6	104.5	103.9	622.1	
32	Audrey Zahra Dhiyaanisa (INA)	103.0	104.1	104.6	103.0	102.4	104.9	622.0	
33	Haruka Nakaguchi (JPN)	102.9	103.9	102.6	104.4	104.1	104.0	621.9	
34	Cho Eun-young (KOR)	103.2	102.8	104.6	102.9	105.6	102.8	621.9	
35	Thanyalak Chotphibunsin (THA)	103.4	103.9	104.6	103.7	103.0	103.0	621.6	
36	Sung Yu-ting (TPE)	102.6	102.7	104.5	104.3	104.0	103.4	621.5	
37	Chuluunbadrakhyn Narantuyaa (MGL)	103.7	102.7	102.1	104.9	103.7	103.8	620.9	
38	Najmeh Khedmati (IRI)	104.2	102.9	103.1	102.6	103.9	103.8	620.5	
39	Alia Husna Budruddin (MAS)	102.3	101.9	103.1	103.4	104.5	104.7	619.9	
40	Mehak Fatima (PAK)	102.6	101.2	102.5	106.6	102.6	104.1	619.6	
41	Safa Al-Doseri (BRN)	102.9	103.1	102.9	103.0	103.0	103.9	618.8	
42	Amparo Acuña (PHI)	102.1	102.9	105.1	103.4	103.0	101.5	618.0	
43	Malika Lagutenko (TJK)	102.1	103.9	103.0	101.4	103.9	103.5	617.8	
44	Nur Suryani Taibi (MAS)	101.7	103.9	105.0	102.0	101.7	103.5	617.8	
45	Aijan Ergeshova (KGZ)	102.9	102.8	102.5	103.7	102.6	103.1	617.6	
46	Amelia Sifaul Citra (INA)	103.0	103.7	102.3	102.8	102.7	102.8	617.3	
47	Shlisha Bhandari (NEP)	101.1	100.3	102.5	105.0	104.8	103.2	616.9	
48	Siham Al-Hasani (OMA)	101.3	103.7	102.2	103.3	103.2	101.9	615.6	
49	Yasuyo Matsumoto (JPN)	101.1	102.9	104.0	102.4	102.1	102.8	615.3	
50	Al-Anoud Al-Khalili (OMA)	102.4	102.1	102.3	102.2	104.1	101.8	614.9	
51	Sara Al-Doseri (BRN)	100.1	101.9	104.7	102.6	101.4	103.8	614.5	
52	Tamiris Abdykerimova (KGZ)	99.2	104.8	102.0	104.2	101.1	102.7	614.0	
53	Yasmin Tahlak (UAE)	103.2	102.3	102.2	100.1	102.4	103.7	613.9	
54	Lenchu Kunzang (BHU)	101.9	103.1	102.2	101.9	99.8	103.0	611.9	
55	Amina Al-Tarshi (OMA)	103.1	101.4	103.5	102.2	99.8	101.7	611.7	
56	Matara Al-Aseiri (QAT)	101.4	100.6	101.7	102.3	103.6	101.3	610.9	
57	Jayden Mohprasit (THA)	101.1	102.3	100.9	101.8	100.6	102.8	609.5	
58	Sushmita Nepal (NEP)	103.2	100.0	102.6	99.3	102.2	100.6	607.9	
59	Sharafiyya Abdul Rahman (MDV)	100.1	101.8	102.7	99.2	102.1	100.0	605.9	
—	Shahd Al-Darwish (QAT)							DNS	
—	Aisha Al-Mahmoud (QAT)							DNS	
—	Nelita Ximenes (TLS)							DNS	

=== Final ===
Rank	Athlete	1st stage		2nd stage – Elimination							S-off	Notes
Rank	Athlete	1	2	1	2	3	4	5	6	7	S-off	Notes
1st place, gold medalist(s)	Huang Yuting (CHN)	52.8	105.3	125.9	146.7	168.3	189.2	210.4	231.8	252.7		GR
2nd place, silver medalist(s)	Han Jiayu (CHN)	53.2	104.0	124.6	146.1	167.2	188.3	209.4	230.4	251.3		
3rd place, bronze medalist(s)	Ramita Jindal (IND)	52.7	104.3	125.3	146.6	167.0	187.5	209.0	230.1			
4	Mehuli Ghosh (IND)	52.3	103.8	124.6	145.2	166.6	187.3	208.3				
5	Lee Eun-seo (KOR)	52.0	104.3	125.6	146.3	167.0	187.3				SO	
6	Gankhuyagiin Nandinzayaa (MGL)	51.4	103.5	124.2	145.3	165.6						
7	Oyuunbatyn Yesügen (MGL)	52.7	104.3	124.5	145.1							
8	Chen Chi (TPE)	50.6	102.1	122.3								
