= Shooting at the 2023 Pan American Games – Men's trap =

Men's trap at the 2023 Pan American Games
- Venue: Polígono de tiro de Pudahuel
- Dates: October 26 - October 27
- Competitors: 27 from 15 nations

Medalists
Gold medal	Jean Pierre Brol	Independent Athletes Team
Silver medal	Leonel Martínez	Venezuela
Bronze medal	Hebert Brol	Independent Athletes Team

The men's trap competition of the shooting events at the 2023 Pan American Games was held from October 26 to 27 at Polígono de Tiro de Pudahuel in Santiago, Chile.

== Schedule ==
Date	Time	Round
October 26, 2023	09:30	Qualification - Day 1
October 27, 2023	09:30	Qualification - Day 2
October 27, 2023	14:30	Final

== Results ==
=== Qualification round ===
The best six scores advance to the final.

Rank	Athlete	Country	1	2	3	4	5	Total	Notes
1	Jean Pierre Brol	Independent Athletes Team	24	24	24	25	24	121	Q, CB:3
2	Jorge Orozco	Mexico	24	23	23	24	24	118	Q
3	Hebert Brol	Independent Athletes Team	24	25	22	22	24	117	Q, CR:34
4	Alessandro de Souza Ferreira	Peru	24	24	21	23	24	116	Q, CB:25
5	Derrick Mein	United States	24	25	22	22	23	116	Q, CB:48
6	Leonel Martínez	Venezuela	23	23	23	23	23	115	Q, CB:10
7	Jaison Santin	Brazil	23	22	21	24	24	114	
8	William Hinton	United States	21	22	25	22	24	114	CB:4
9	Joaquin Cisneros	Argentina	21	24	24	23	21	113	
10	Hussein Kluber	Brazil	23	24	23	22	21	113	CB:12
11	Franco Gonzalez	Uruguay	20	22	24	21	25	112	
12	Claudio Vergara	Chile	23	23	19	23	24	112	CB:4
13	Esteban Caro	Colombia	22	23	23	22	22	112	CB:1
14	Mario Soares	Venezuela	21	22	24	24	21	112	CB:11
15	Asier Cilloniz	Peru	19	22	19	24	25	109	
16	Eduardo Lorenzo	Dominican Republic	21	21	21	23	23	109	
17	Justin St. John	Barbados	21	22	24	21	21	109	CB:6
18	Fernando Vidal	Argentina	20	20	23	21	24	108	CB:7
19	Danilo Caro	Colombia	25	21	22	18	21	107	
20	Domingo Nicolás Lorenzo	Dominican Republic	20	21	22	22	20	105	
21	Cristóbal Valenzuela	Chile	23	24	18	20	19	104	CB:17
22	Luis Orranti	Mexico	21	22	20	19	21	103	CB:7
23	Manuel García	Panama	19	20	20	19	24	102	
24	Colin Grover	Canada	21	20	21	17	23	102	
25	César Menacho	Bolivia	20	15	22	22	18	97	
26	Richard Greenidge	Barbados	22	23	13	17	18	93	CB:14
27	Eduardo Taylor	Panama	20	20	18	18	17	93	CB:1

=== Final ===
The results were as follows:

Rank	Athlete	Country	Total	Notes
1st place, gold medalist(s)	Jean Pierre Brol	Independent Athletes Team	43	PR
2nd place, silver medalist(s)	Leonel Martínez	Venezuela	42	
3rd place, bronze medalist(s)	Hebert Brol	Independent Athletes Team	30	
4	Alessandro de Souza Ferreira	Peru	28	
5	Derrick Mein	United States	22	
6	Jorge Orozco	Mexico	16	
