= Huang Yuting (sport shooter) =

Chinese sport shooter (born 2006)

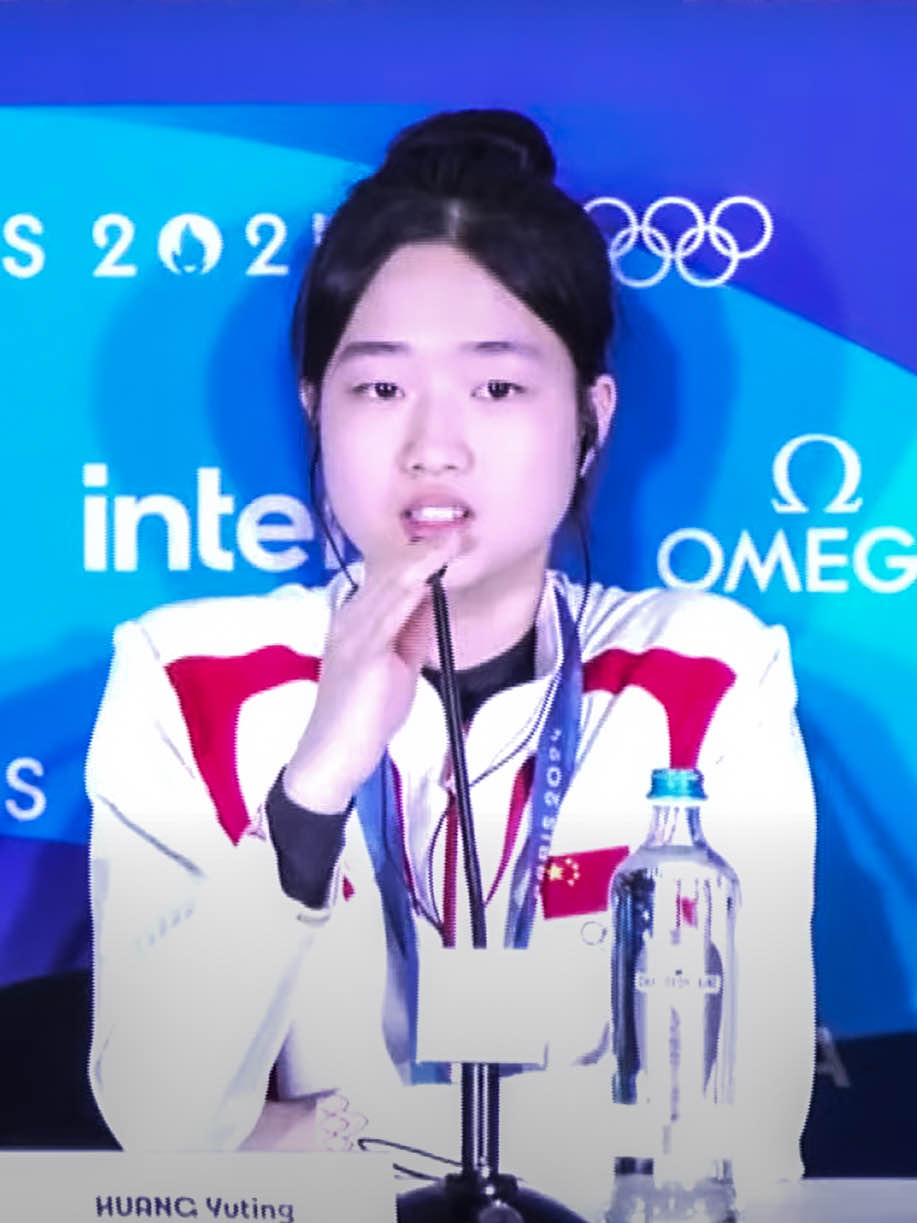
- Huang in 2024

Personal information
- Born: 3 September 2006 (age 20) Taizhou, Zhejiang, China

Sport
- Sport: Sports shooting
Medal record
Women's shooting
Representing China
Olympic Games
| Gold medal – first place | 2024 Paris | 10 m air rifle mixed team |
| Silver medal – second place | 2024 Paris | 10 m air rifle |
World Championships
| Gold medal – first place | 2022 Cairo | 10 m air rifle mixed team |
| Gold medal – first place | 2022 Cairo | 10 m air rifle team |
| Gold medal – first place | 2023 Baku | 10 m air rifle mixed team |
| Silver medal – second place | 2022 Cairo | 10 m air rifle |
Asian Games
| Gold medal – first place | 2022 Hangzhou | 10 m air rifle |
| Gold medal – first place | 2022 Hangzhou | 10 m air rifle mixed team |
| Gold medal – first place | 2022 Hangzhou | 10 m air rifle team |
Asian Championships
| Gold medal – first place | 2023 Changwon | 10 m air rifle team |

Huang Yuting (simplified Chinese: 黄雨婷; traditional Chinese: 黃雨婷; pinyin: Huáng Yǔtíng; born 3 September 2006) is a Chinese sports shooter. She won three medals in air rifle events at the 2022 ISSF World Shooting Championships. She won the gold medal in 10m Air Rifle Mixed Team in a duo with Sheng Lihao and a silver medal in 10m Air Rifle event at the Summer Olympics 2024 in Paris.
