= Rylan Kissell =

American sport shooter (born 2002)

Personal information
- Born: Rylan William Kissell; May 13, 2002 (age 24) Wheat Ridge, Colorado, U.S.
- Education: University of Alaska Fairbanks

Sport
- Country: United States
- Sport: Shooting
Medal record
Men's shooting
Representing United States
Pan American Games
Gold medal – first place	2023 Santiago	Mixed pairs air rifle
Silver medal – second place	2023 Santiago	10 m air rifle

Rylan William Kissell (/ˈraɪlən ˈkɪsəl/ RYE-lən KISS-əl; born May 13, 2002) is an American sport shooter. He won the gold medal in mixed pairs air rifle at the 2023 Pan American Games along with Mary Tucker.
