= Judo at the 2015 Pan American Games – Men's 73 kg =

Men's 73 kg at the 2015 Pan American Games
- Venue: Mississauga Sports Centre
- Dates: July 12
- Competitors: 9 from 9 nations

Medalists
Gold medal	Magdiel Estrada	Cuba
Silver medal	Alejandro Clara	Argentina
Bronze medal	Augusto Miranda	Puerto Rico
Bronze medal	Arthur Margelidon	Canada

The men's 73 kg competition of the judo events at the 2015 Pan American Games in Toronto, Canada, was held on July 12 at the Mississauga Sports Centre.

== Schedule ==
All times are Central Standard Time (UTC-6).

Date	Time	Round
July 12, 2015	15:44	Preliminary bout
July 12, 2015	15:44	Quarterfinals
July 12, 2015	16:33	Repechage
July 12, 2015	17:22	Semifinals
July 12, 2015	20:52	Bronze medal matches
July 12, 2015	21:06	Final

== Results ==
Legend

- 1st number = Ippon
- 2nd number = Waza-ari
- 3rd number = Yuko

=== Bracket ===
Preliminaries
David Tavera (MEX)	000S1
Fernando Ibañez (ECU)	001S1

Quarter Finals
Alex William Pombo Silva (BRA)	100
Juan Rosa (ESA)	000
Alejandro Clara (ARG)	010S2
Fernando Ibañez (ECU)	000S2
Magdiel Estrada (CUB)	001
Lwilli Santana (DOM)	001S3
Arthur Margelidon (CAN)	000
Augusto Miranda (PUR)	001S1

Semi Finals
Alex William Pombo Silva (BRA)	000S3
Alejandro Clara (ARG)	000S2
Magdiel Estrada (CUB)	100S1
Augusto Miranda (PUR)	000S2

Final
Alejandro Clara (ARG)	000S1
Magdiel Estrada (CUB)	000

=== Repechage round ===
Two bronze medals were awarded.

Repechage		Bronze medal
Juan Rosa (ESA)	000S3
Fernando Ibañez (ECU)	001S2	Fernando Ibañez (ECU)	000S2
		Augusto Miranda (PUR)	000S1

Repechage		Bronze medal
Lwilli Santana (DOM)	000S1
Arthur Margelidon (CAN)	100S1	Arthur Margelidon (CAN)	100S1
		Alex William Pombo Silva (BRA)	010
