= Gavin Barnick =

American sport shooter (born 2002)

Personal information
- Nationality: American
- Born: November 23, 2002 (age 23) Menasha, Wisconsin

Sport
- Country: United States
- Sport: Shooting
Medal record
Men's shooting
Representing United States
Pan American Games
Bronze medal – third place	2023 Santiago	Mixed pairs air rifle

Gavin Barnick (born November 23, 2002) is an American sport shooter. He won the bronze medal in the 2023 Pan American Games in the Mixed pairs air rifle along with Sagen Maddalena.
