= Ramita Jindal =

Indian sport shooter (born 2004)

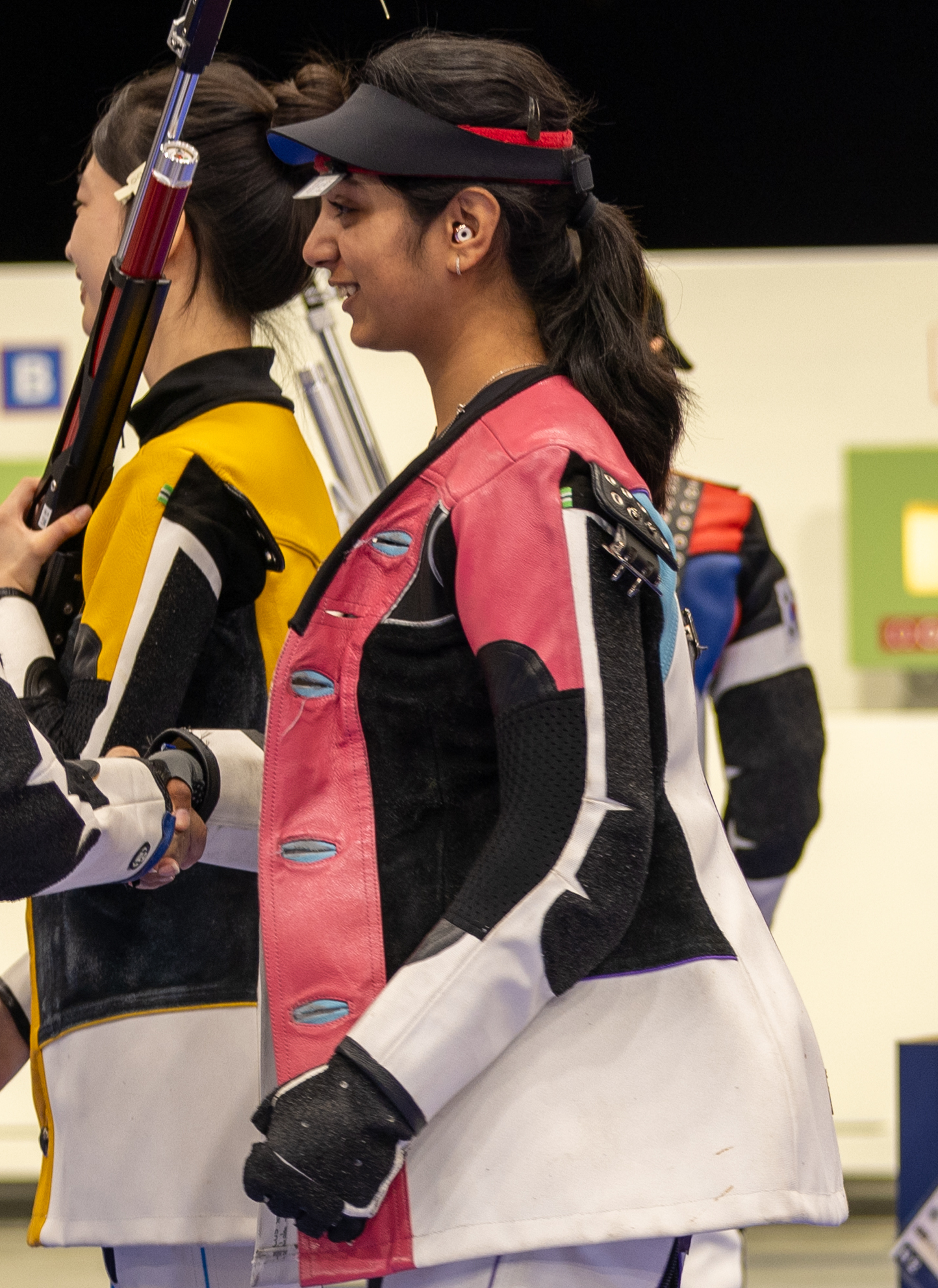
- Jindal after the 10 metre air rifle final at the 2024 Summer Olympics

Personal information
- Nationality: Indian
- Born: 16 January 2004 (age 22) Ladwa, Kurukshetra, Haryana, India
- Height: 1.58 m (5 ft 2 in)

Sport
- Country: India
- Sport: shooting
Medal record
Women's shooting
Representing India
World Championships
Gold medal – first place	2023 Baku	10 m air rifle team
Gold medal – first place	2022 Cairo	10 m air rifle junior
Gold medal – first place	2022 Cairo	10 m air rifle junior team
ISSF World Cup
Gold medal – first place	2022 Baku	10 m air rifle team
Silver medal – second place	2022 Changwon	10 m air rifle team
Asian Shooting Championships
Silver medal – second place	2023 Changwon	10 m air rifle mixed team
Bronze medal – third place	2023 Changwon	10 m air rifle
Bronze medal – third place	2023 Changwon	10 m air rifle team
Asian Games
Silver medal – second place	2022 Hangzhou	10m air rifle team
Bronze medal – third place	2022 Hangzhou	10 m air rifle
ISSF Junior World Championships
Bronze medal – third place	2021 Lima	10 m air rifle

Ramita Jindal (born 16 January 2004) is an Indian sport shooter. She won a silver medal in the women's 10 metre air rifle team event and a bronze medal in the women's 10 metre air rifle event at the 2022 Asian Games. She is a student of Hansraj College, Delhi University.

== Career ==
In the Indian Olympic selection trials in 2024, she scored 636.4 points, 0.1 more than the world record. With a score of 631.5 in the qualification round, she came fifth and made it to the finals of the women's 10 metre air rifle event at the 2024 Summer Olympics in Paris.
