= Shannon Westlake =

Canadian sport shooter (born 1985)

Personal information
- Born: November 21, 1985 (age 40) Toronto, Canada
- Height: 167 cm (5 ft 6 in)

Sport
- Sport: Sport shooting rifle
Medal record
Women's shooting
Representing Canada
Pan American Games
Bronze medal – third place	2023 Santiago	50 m rifle 3 positions

Shannon Westlake (born November 21, 1985) is a Canadian sport shooter competing in the rifle discipline. Westlake was born in Toronto, and raised in Keswick, Ontario.

== Career ==
Westlake has represented Canada at three Pan American Games. In her debut at the 2015 Pan American Games in Toronto, Canada, Westlake finished 18th in the Women's 50 metre rifle three positions event. In 2019, Westlake finished ninth in the Women's 50 metre rifle three positions event. Finally in 2023, Westlake won the bronze medal for Canada in the Women's 50 metre rifle three positions. The bronze medal helped secure an Olympic Quota for the 2024 Summer Olympics.

In July 2024, Westlake was officially named to Canada's 2024 Olympic team.
