= Leonel Martínez =

Venezuelan sports shooter (born 1963)

Personal information
- Nationality: Venezuelan
- Born: 18 September 1963 (age 62)

Sport
- Sport: Sports shooting
Medal record
Men's shooting
Representing Venezuela
Pan American Games
| Silver medal – second place | 2023 Santiago | Trap |

Leonel Martínez (born 18 September 1963) is a Venezuelan sports shooter. He competed in the mixed trap event at the 1984 Summer Olympics.

In October 2023, he qualified for the Paris 2024 Olympic Games, where he finished 28th of 30.
