= Shooting at the 2023 Pan American Games =

- Shooting pictogram
- Venue: Polígono de Tiro de Pudahuel
- Start date: October 21, 2023
- End date: October 27, 2023
- No. of events: 15 (6 men, 6 women, 3 mixed)
- Competitors: 244 from 20 nations

Shooting competitions at the 2023 Pan American Games in Santiago, Chile are scheduled to be held between October 21 and 27, 2023 at the Polígono de Tiro de Pudahuel.

15 medal events are scheduled to be contested. Six for men, six for women and three mixed gender events. A total of 244 sport shooters will qualify to compete at the games.

The top shooter, not already qualified, in rifle and pistol individual events, together with the top two shooters, not already qualified, in shotgun individual events, will qualify for the 2024 Summer Olympics in Paris, France.

== Qualification ==
A total of 244 sport shooters will qualify to compete. Each nation may enter a maximum of 24 athletes (two per each individual event). There will be three qualification events for shooters to qualify. There will be no quotas awarded for the mixed events, as nations must use already qualified athletes to compete in them. As host nation, Chile will get a quota of six athletes (two per each discipline, and can qualify more) and there will also be two wild cards awarded to nations not qualified.

== Participating nations ==
A total of 20 countries qualified athletes.

- Argentina (14)
- Barbados (4)
- Bolivia (3)
- Brazil (18)
- Canada (14)
- Chile (12)
- Colombia (5)
- Cuba (14)
- Dominican Republic (4)
- Ecuador (8)
- El Salvador (4)
- Independent Athletes Team (17)
- Mexico (20)
- Panama (4)
- Paraguay (1)
- Peru (20)
- Puerto Rico (14)
- United States (27)
- Uruguay (1)
- Venezuela (6)

== Medal summary ==
=== Medal table ===
* Host nation (Chile)

Rank	NOC's	Gold	Silver	Bronze	Total
1	United States	5	5	8	18
2	Mexico	5	4	0	9
3	Independent Athletes Team	2	1	1	4
4	Canada	1	0	1	2
5	Chile*	1	0	0	1
5	Cuba	1	0	0	1
7	Argentina	0	2	0	2
7	Venezuela	0	2	0	2
9	Ecuador	0	1	1	2
10	Peru	0	0	3	3
11	Brazil	0	0	1	1
Totals (11 entries)		15	15	15	45

=== Medalists ===
==== Men ====
Event	Gold	Silver	Bronze
10 metre air rifle	Edson Ramírez; Mexico	Rylan Kissell; United States	Cristian Morales; Peru
50 metre rifle three positions	Carlos Quezada; Mexico	Timothy Sherry; United States	Lucas Kozeniesky; United States
10 metre air pistol	Tugrul Ozer; Canada	James Hall; United States	Felipe Wu; Brazil
25 metre rapid fire pistol	Leuris Pupo; Cuba	Douglas Gómez; Venezuela	Henry Leverett; United States
Trap	Jean Pierre Brol; Independent Athletes Team	Leonel Martínez; Venezuela	Hebert Brol; Independent Athletes Team
Skeet	Vincent Hancock; United States	Federico Gil; Argentina	Nicolás Pacheco; Peru

==== Women ====
Event	Gold	Silver	Bronze
10 metre air rifle	Sagen Maddalena; United States	Fernanda Russo; Argentina	Mary Tucker; United States
50 metre rifle three positions	Mary Tucker; United States	Sagen Maddalena; United States	Shannon Westlake; Canada
10 metre air pistol	Alejandra Zavala; Mexico	Alexis Lagan; United States	Diana Durango; Ecuador
25 metre pistol	Alejandra Zavala; Mexico	Diana Durango; Ecuador	Alexis Lagan; United States
Trap	Adriana Ruano; Independent Athletes Team	Waleska Soto; Independent Athletes Team	Rachel Tozier; United States
Skeet	Francisca Crovetto; Chile	Gabriela Rodríguez; Mexico	Daniella Borda; Peru

==== Mixed ====
Event	Gold	Silver	Bronze
10 metre air pistol	Mexico; Carlos González; Andrea Ibarra	Mexico; Daniel Urquiza; Alejandra Zavala	United States; Nick Mowrer; Lisa Emmert
10 metre air rifle	United States; Rylan Kissell; Mary Tucker	Mexico; Edson Ramírez; Goretti Zumaya	United States; Gavin Barnick; Sagen Maddalena
Skeet	United States; Vincent Hancock; Dania Vizzi	Mexico; Luis Gallardo; Gabriela Rodríguez	United States; Dustan Taylor; Austen Smith

== See also ==
- Shooting at the 2023 Parapan American Games
- Shooting at the 2024 Summer Olympics
