= Edson Ramírez =

Mexican sport shooter (born 2000)

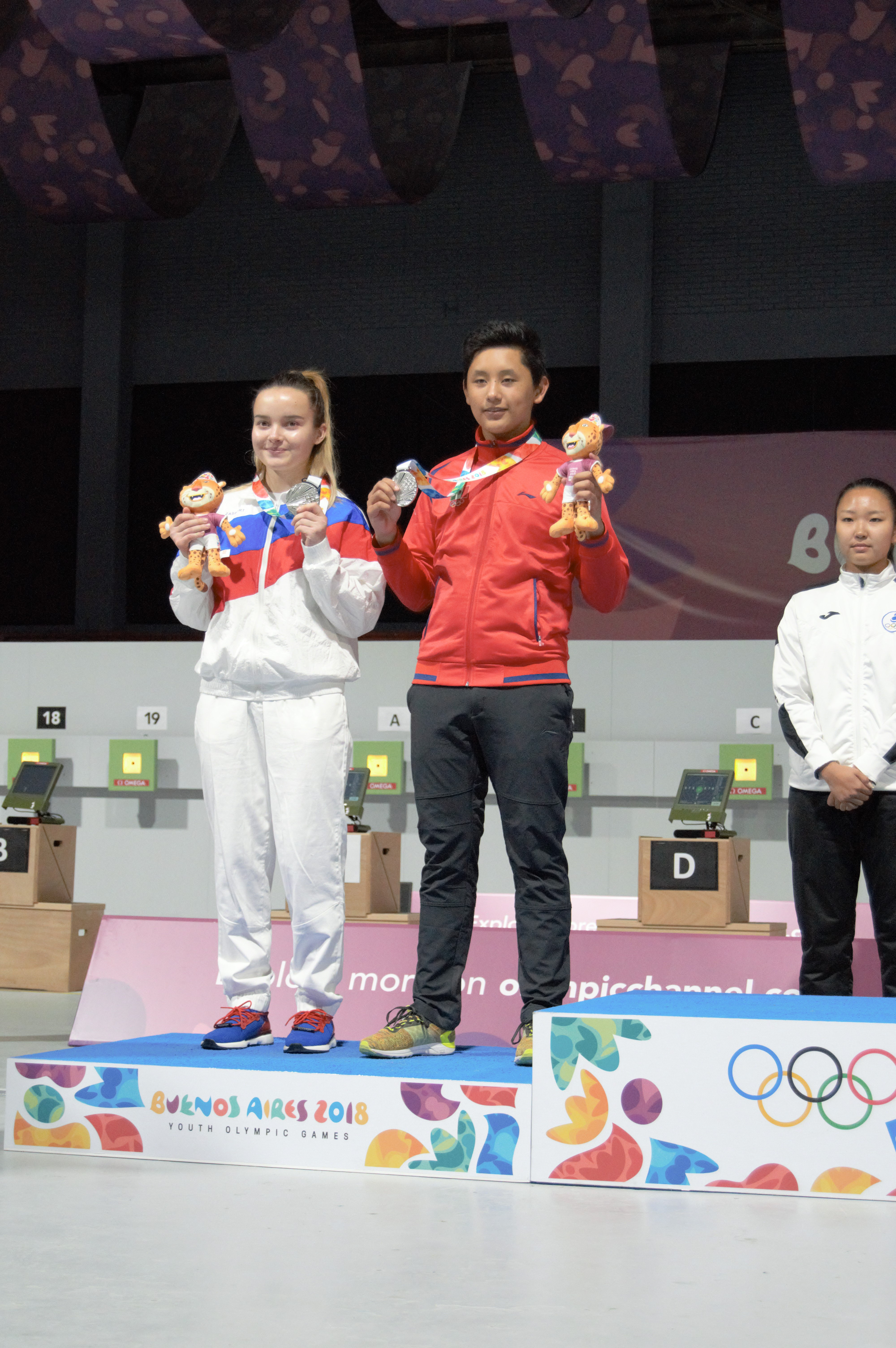
- Ramírez (in red) at the 2018 Summer Youth Olympics

Personal information
- Full name: Edson Ismael Ramírez Ramos
- Born: 10 July 2000 (age 26) Ciudad Victoria, Tamaulipas, Mexico

Sport
- Country: Mexico
- Sport: Shooting
Medal record
Men's shooting
Representing Mexico
Pan American Games
Gold medal – first place	2023 Santiago	10 m air rifle
Silver medal – second place	2019 Lima	10 m air rifle
Silver medal – second place	2023 Santiago	Mixed pairs air rifle
Bronze medal – third place	2019 Lima	Mixed 10 m air rifle
Central American and Caribbean Games
Gold medal – first place	2018 Barranquilla	10 m air rifle
Gold medal – first place	2018 Barranquilla	Team 10 m air rifle
Gold medal – first place	2018 Barranquilla	Mixed 10 m air rifle

Edson Ismael Ramírez Ramos (Note: In this Spanish name, the first or paternal surname is Ramírez and the second or maternal family name is Ramos.) (born 10 July 2000) is a Mexican sport shooter. He won the silver medal in the men's 10 metres air rifle event at the 2019 Pan American Games held in Lima, Peru. He also won the bronze medal in the mixed 10 metres air rifle event together with Gabriela Martínez.

In 2018, he won the silver medal in the mixed 10 metre air rifle event at the Summer Youth Olympics held in Buenos Aires, Argentina. He also competed in the boys' 10 metre air rifle where he failed to qualify to compete in the final.

He represented Mexico at the 2020 Summer Olympics in Tokyo, Japan. He competed in the men's 10 metre air rifle event.
