= Mukhtasar Tokhirova =

Uzbekistani sports shooter (born 2000)

Personal information
- Nationality: Uzbekistani
- Born: 5 March 2000 (age 26)

Sport
- Sport: Sports shooting
Medal record
Women's shooting
Representing Uzbekistan
Asian Games
Silver medal – second place	2022 Hangzhou	10 m air rifle mixed team
Asian Airgun Championships
Silver medal – second place	2021 Shymkent	10 m air rifle mixed team

Mukhtasar Tokhirova (born 5 March 2000) is an Uzbekistani sports shooter. She competed in the women's 10 metre air rifle event at the 2020 Summer Olympics.
