= Amanda Furrer =

American sport shooter

Personal information
- Born: January 17, 1991 (age 35) Spokane, Washington, U.S.
- Height: 5 ft 6 in (168 cm)
- Weight: 123 lb (56 kg)

Sport
- Country: United States
- Sport: Sports shooting
- Event: STR3X20
- College team: Ohio State Buckeyes
Medal record
Women's shooting
Representing United States
Pan American Games
| Bronze medal – third place | 2007 Rio de Janeiro | STR3X20 |
World Championships
| Gold medal – first place | 2010 Munich | STR3X20 Team |

Amanda Banta (née Furrer, born January 17, 1991) is an American rifle shooter who competes in the 50 metre rifle three positions event. She won a bronze medal at the 2007 Pan American Games. She competed at the 2012 Summer Olympics, where she placed 15th in the 50 m rifle three positions event.

Furrer was also an alternate at the 2008 Summer Olympics.
