= Mary Tucker (sport shooter) =

American sports shooter (born 2001)

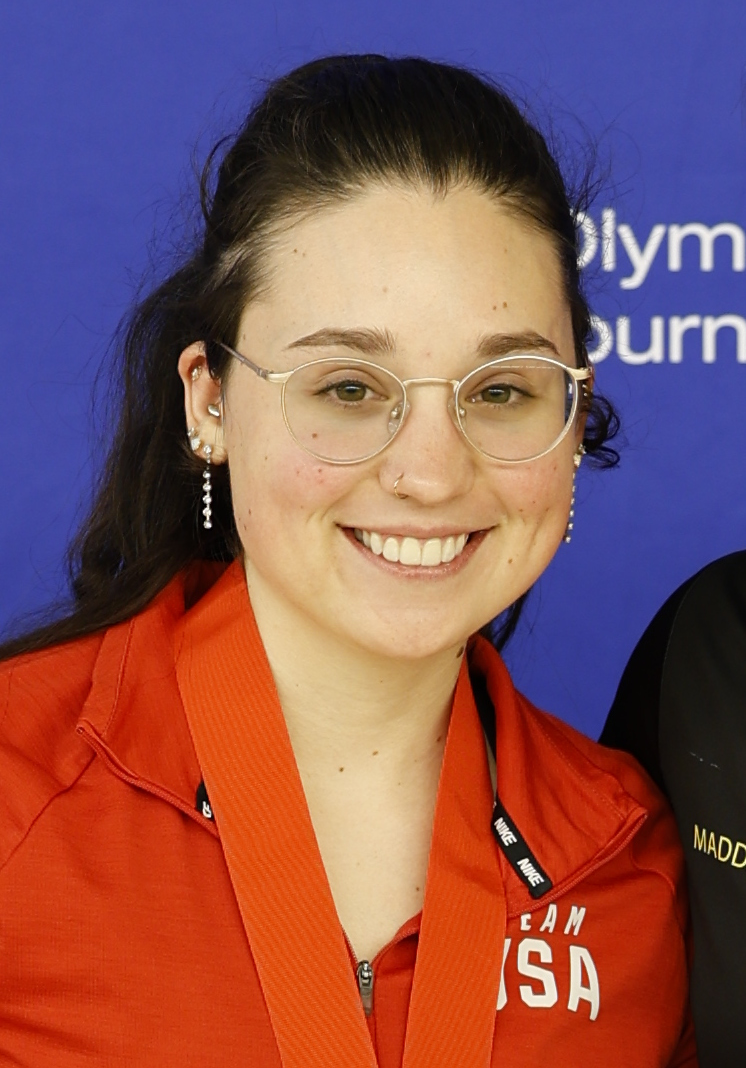
- Tucker in 2023

Personal information
- Full name: Mary Carolynn Tucker
- Nationality: United States
- Born: July 20, 2001 (age 24) Pineville, North Carolina, U.S.
- Height: 5 ft 3 in (160 cm)
- Weight: 120 lb (54 kg)

Sport
- Country: USA
- Sport: Shooting
- Club: West Virginia Mountaineers
- Coached by: Jayme Shipley
Medal record
Women's shooting
Representing the United States
Olympic Games
| Silver medal – second place | 2020 Tokyo | Mixed 10 m air rifle team |
Pan American Games
| Gold medal – first place | 2023 Santiago | 50 m rifle three positions |
| Gold medal – first place | 2023 Santiago | Mixed 10 m air rifle |
| Bronze medal – third place | 2023 Santiago | 10 m air rifle |
World Championships
| Gold medal – first place | 2023 Baku | 50 m rifle 3 positions team |
| Silver medal – second place | 2022 Cairo | 10 m air rifle team |
| Bronze medal – third place | 2022 Cairo | 50 m rifle prone |
World Cup
| Gold medal – first place | 2021 New Delhi | 10 m air rifle |
World Summer University Games
| Silver medal – second place | 2021 Chengdu | 10 m Air rifle |
| Bronze medal – third place | 2021 Chengdu | Mixed 10 m air rifle team |

Mary Carolynn Tucker (born July 20, 2001) is an American sport shooter. She won silver in the 10m air rifle mixed at the 2020 Tokyo Olympic Games. Previously she has won gold at the 2021 ISSF World Cup in the 10 metre air rifle. She also won a silver medal in 10 metre air rifle team women and a bronze medal in 10m air rifle mixed team in the ISSF World Cup 2021, New Delhi. After the games she took home 6 medals from the Junior World Championships and the 10 meter air rifle championship from the 2021 Pan American Games. Tucker is right handed and is right eye dominant.

After completing high school at Sarasota Military Academy she enrolled at the University of Kentucky (UK). Tucker qualified for the U.S. Olympic team in February 2020 for Tokyo Olympics in air rifle. In March 2021, she led UK to the NCAA rifle team championship, winning individual titles in both contested disciplines of air rifle and smallbore. She has since doubled the NCAA team championship as well as winning overall high performer for the second straight year. Following her junior season at Kentucky, Tucker transferred to West Virginia University, where she was crowned 2023 CRCA and GARC Shooter of the Year, among numerous accolades.
