= Goretti Zumaya =

Mexican sport shooter (born 1997)

Personal information
- Full name: Goretti Alejandra Zumaya Flores
- Nationality: (Mexico) Mexican
- Born: 31 May 1997 (age 29) Salamanca, Guanajuato, Mexico
Medal record
Women's shooting
Representing Mexico
Pan American Games
Gold medal – first place	2015 Toronto	10 m air rifle
Silver medal – second place	2023 Santiago	Mixed 10 m air rifle

Goretti Alejandra Zumaya Flores (Note: In this Spanish name, the first or paternal surname is Zumaya and the second or maternal family name is Flores.) (born 31 May 1997) is a Mexican sports shooter. She competed in the women's 10 metre air rifle event at the 2016 Summer Olympics. Zumaya also competed in the same event(individual and team) at the 2024 Summer Olympics.
