= Fernanda Russo =

Argentine sport shooter (born 1999)

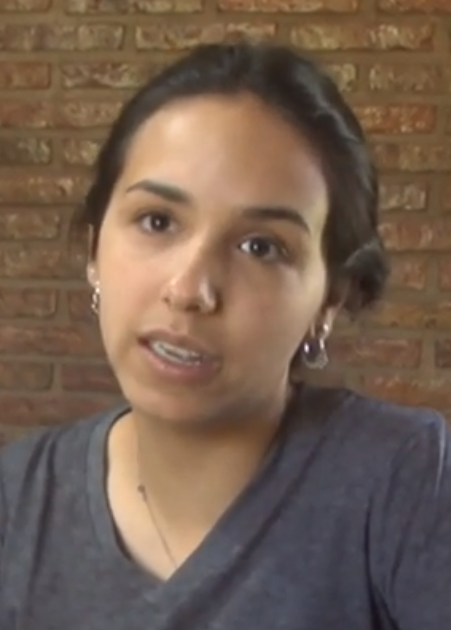
- Fernanda Russo

Personal information
- Full name: Fernanda Russo
- Nationality: Argentina
- Born: 2 October 1999 (age 26) Córdoba, Argentina
- Height: 1.66 m (5 ft 5 in)
- Weight: 58 kg (128 lb)

Sport
- Sport: Shooting
- Event: 10 m air rifle (AR40)
Medal record
Women's shooting
Representing Argentina
Pan American Games
Gold medal – first place	2019 Lima	Mixed 10 m air rifle
Silver medal – second place	2015 Toronto	10 m air rifle
Silver medal – second place	2023 Santiago	10 m air rifle
Bronze medal – third place	2019 Lima	10 m air rifle
Representing (International Olympic Committee) Mixed-NOCs
Summer Youth Olympics
Silver medal – second place	2014 Nanjing	Mixed team

Fernanda Russo (born 2 October 1999 in Córdoba) is an Argentine sport shooter. She won a silver medal in the air rifle at the 2015 Pan American Games, and also shared a runner-up prize with Mexico's José Santos Valdes in the mixed international rifle team at the 2014 Summer Youth Olympics.

Russo made her first Olympic team for Argentina as a fourteen-year-old at the 2014 Summer Youth Olympics in Nanjing, China, claiming the silver medal in shooting. In her first event, the girls' 10 m air rifle, she shot 406.9 points to finish thirteenth from a field of twenty but missed out on a chance to compete in the final. Two days later, Russo and her Mexican partner José Santos Valdes had put up a decent aim to take home the silver in the mixed international rifle team competition, losing the final match 2–10 to Hungary's István Péni and Egypt's Hadir Mekhimar.

The 2015 Pan American Games in Toronto, Ontario, Canada sought Russo a chance to prove her credentials on the world stage despite her age. Coming to the final round of the women's 10 m air rifle with a fourth-seeded score of 411.3, Russo marked a superb 204.7 to claim a silver medal in a duel against Mexico's Goretti Zumaya, who eventually walked away with a victory by just a narrow 0.1-point margin. Moreover, Russo secured a place on the Argentine team and had an opportunity to be selected for her first ever Olympics.

She competed at the 2020 Summer Olympics.
