= Shermineh Chehel-Amirani =

Iranian Shooting Athlete

Personal information
- Born: June 20, 1999 (age 27) Tehran, Iran
- Education: Polymer Engineering at Amir Kabir University

Sport
- Country: Iran
- Sport: Shooting
- Event: 10m Air Rifle
- Coached by: Maryam Talebi (National Team)
Medal record
Event / 1st / 2nd / 3rd; World Championships / – / 1 / –
Women's shooting
Representing Iran
World Championships
Silver medal – second place	2023 Baku	10m Air Rifle Mixed Team
- Updated on 20 July 2024

Shermineh Chehel Amirani (Persian: شرمینه چهل‌امیرانی; born 20 June 1999) is an Iranian Shooting Athlete. She will represent Iran at the 2024 Summer Olympics in Paris.

== 2024 Summer Olympic ==
Year	Host	Event	Score	Rank	Final	Ref
2024	Paris, France	10 metre air rifle	630.0	11	Did not advance	
