= Sagen Maddalena =

American sport shooter

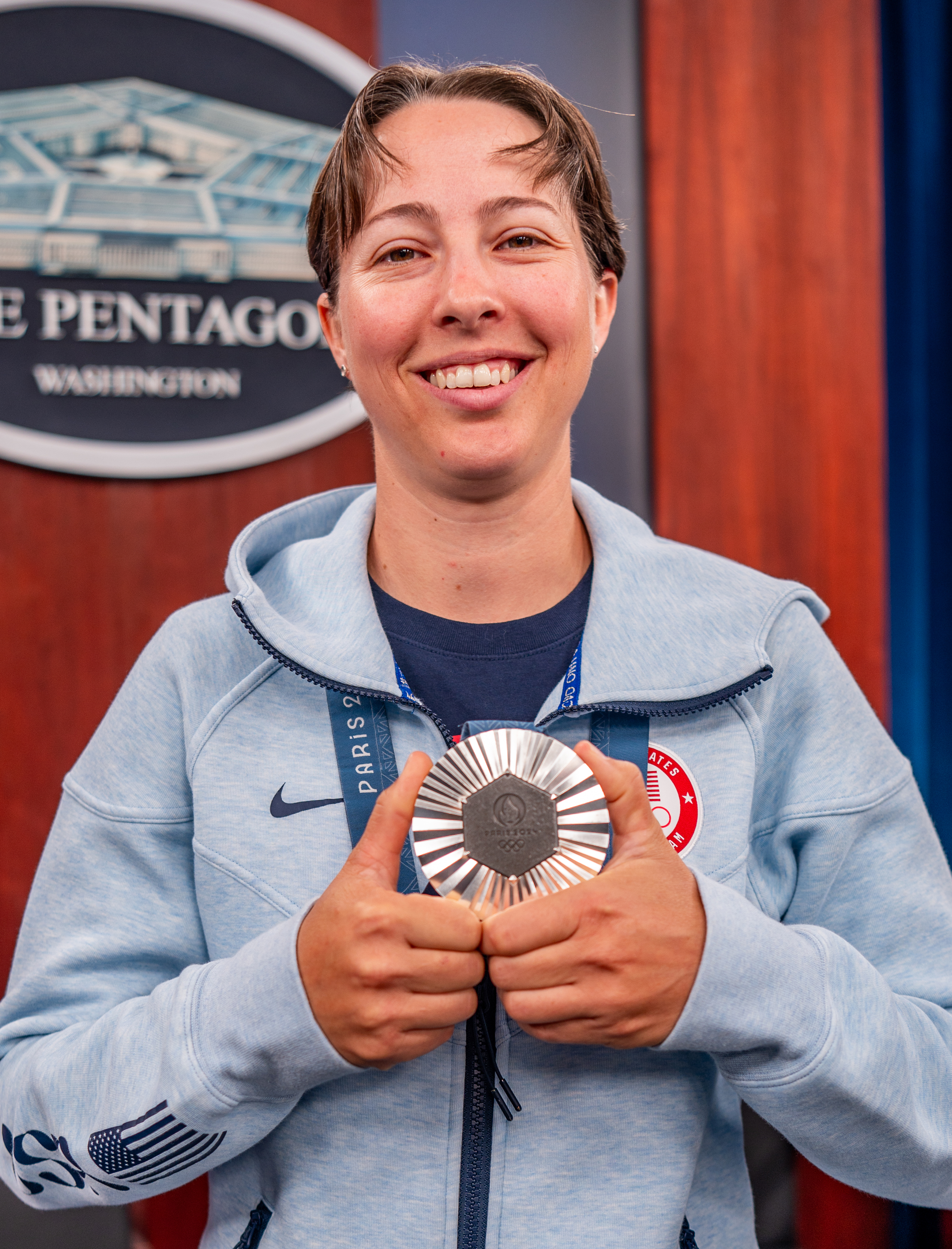
- Maddalena in 2024

Personal information
- Born: August 16, 1993 (age 32) Woodland, California, U.S.

Sport
- Sport: Shooting
Medal record
Women's shooting
Representing the United States
Olympic Games
Silver medal – second place	2024 Paris	50m rifle 3 positions
World Championships
Gold medal – first place	2022 Cairo	50 m rifle prone mixed team
Gold medal – first place	2023 Baku	50 m rifle 3 positions team
Silver medal – second place	2022 Cairo	10 m air rifle team
Bronze medal – third place	2023 Baku	50 m rifle 3 position
World Cup Final
Gold medal – first place	2021 Wroclaw	50 m rifle 3 positions
Gold medal – first place	2021 Wroclaw	50 m rifle 3 positions mixed team
Bronze medal – third place	2022 Cairo	10m air rifle
World Cup
Silver medal – second place	2022 Rio De Janeiro	50 m rifle 3 positions Team
Silver medal – second place	2022 Cairo	50 m rifle 3 positions Team
Silver medal – second place	2021 New Dehli	10m air rifle Team
Bronze medal – third place	2022 Rio De Janeiro	50 m rifle 3 positions
Pan American Games
Gold medal – first place	2023 Santiago	10 metre air rifle
Bronze medal – third place	2023 Santiago	Mixed pairs air rifle

Sagen Maddalena (/ˈseɪdʒən ˌmædəˈliːnə/ SAY-jən MAD-ə-LEE-nə; born 16 August 1993) is a soldier and an American sport shooter. She represented the United States at the 2020 Summer Olympics in Tokyo and the 2024 Summer Olympics in Paris. She currently lives in Groveland, California.

She is a sergeant in the United States Army and serves as a shooter/instructor with the international team of the Army Marksmanship Unit.

== Career ==
Maddalena got her start in competitive precision shooting on the state team as a California Grizzlies junior team member, competing in service rifle and being team captain. She credits this team for teaching her leadership and teamwork. She attended her first Civilian Marksmanship Program Highpower National Match at Camp Perry, Ohio during the summer of 2010. Sagen was awarded Distinguished Rifleman by the Civilian Marksmanship Program in 2011.

Maddalena competed on the University of Alaska Fairbanks Rifle Team 2013–2018. During that time she redshirted her first year and then competed the next four years. Maddalena is a four-time NRA First Team All-American in Air Rifle (2014–15, 2015–16, 2016-17 & 2017–18), three-time NRA First Team All-American in Smallbore (2015–16, 2016-17 & 2017–18), three-time CRCA First Team Aggregate All-American (2016, 2017 & 2018), and NRA Second Team All-American in Smallbore (2015). She Won Two Gold medals at 2021 President Cup in Wrocław and Won Bronze Medal at 2022 President Cup in Cairo Madalena Won Two Silver Medal and one Bronze Medal at 2022 World Cup. She Won Silver Medal at 2021 World Cup in New Delhi.

Maddalena won a silver medal at the 2024 Paris Olympics in the 50m rifle three positions event.
