= Amelia Fournel =

Argentine sport shooter

Personal information
- Full name: Amelia Rosa Fournel
- Nationality: Argentina
- Born: 1977 (age 48–49) Santa Fe, Argentina
- Height: 1.57 m (5 ft 2 in)
- Weight: 57 kg (126 lb)

Sport
- Sport: Shooting
- Events: 10 m air rifle (AR40); 50 m rifle 3 positions (STR3X20)
- Club: Tiro Federal Santa Fé
- Coached by: Julio Escalante; Claudio Fournel
Medal record
Women's shooting
Representing Argentina
Pan American Games
Silver medal – second place	1995 Mar del Plata	AR40
Silver medal – second place	2015 Toronto	STR3X20
Bronze medal – third place	1999 Winnipeg	AR40
Bronze medal – third place	2003 Santo Domingo	AR40

Amelia Rosa Fournel (born 1977 in Santa Fe) is an Argentine sport shooter. She produced a career tally of five medals, including four (two silver and two bronze) from the Pan American Games, and was selected to compete for Argentina in two editions of the Olympic Games (1996 and 2000). Having pursued the sport since the age of fifteen, Fournel trained full-time for the Santa Fe Shooting Federation (Spanish: Tiro Federal Santa Fe) in her native Santa Fe, under her personal coach and brother Claudio Fournel.

Fournel's Olympic debut came at the 1996 Summer Olympics in Atlanta, where she scored 392 points to finish in a thirteenth-place tie with four other shooters in the 10 m air rifle, narrowly missing out the final round by just a single-point gap.

At the 2000 Summer Olympics in Sydney, Fournel qualified for her second Argentine squad in rifle shooting, by having registered a minimum Olympic qualifying standard of 388 and finishing third from the 1999 Pan American Games in Winnipeg, Manitoba, Canada. In the 10 m air rifle, Fournel could not improve her previous Olympic feat in the qualifying stage, as she logged a dismal score of 390 out of 400 that ended her up in a twenty-eighth place tie with three other shooters. In her second event, 50 m rifle 3 positions, Fournel fired 188 in the prone and 177 each in both standing and kneeling to accumulate an overall record of 542 points, leaving her towards the bottom of the leaderboard in the penultimate position out of forty-two prospective shooters.
