= Diliana Méndez =

Venezuelan sport shooter (born 1982)

Personal information
- Nationality: Venezuela
- Born: 27 October 1982 (age 43) Caracas, Distrito Capital, Venezuela
- Height: 1.72 m (5 ft 7 1/2 in)
- Weight: 58 kg (128 lb)

Sport
- Sport: Shooting
- Event(s): 10 m air rifle (AR40); 50 m rifle 3 positions (STR3X20)
- Club: Orion Practical Shooting Club
- Coached by: Boris Loginov

Diliana Méndez (born October 27, 1982, in Caracas, Distrito Capital) is a Venezuelan sport shooter. She is also a member of Orion Practical Shooting Club in Maracay, Aragua, and is coached and trained by Boris Loginov.

== Career ==
Mendez represented Venezuela at the 2008 Summer Olympics in Beijing, where she competed for two rifle shooting events. She placed forty-third out of forty-seven shooters in the women's 10 m air rifle, with a total score of 386 points. Nearly a week later, Mendez competed for her second event, 50 m rifle 3 positions, where she was able to shoot 192 targets in a prone position, and 188 each in standing and in kneeling, for a total score of 568 points, finishing only in thirty-ninth place.
