= Rosane Ewald =

Brazilian sports shooter (born 1973)

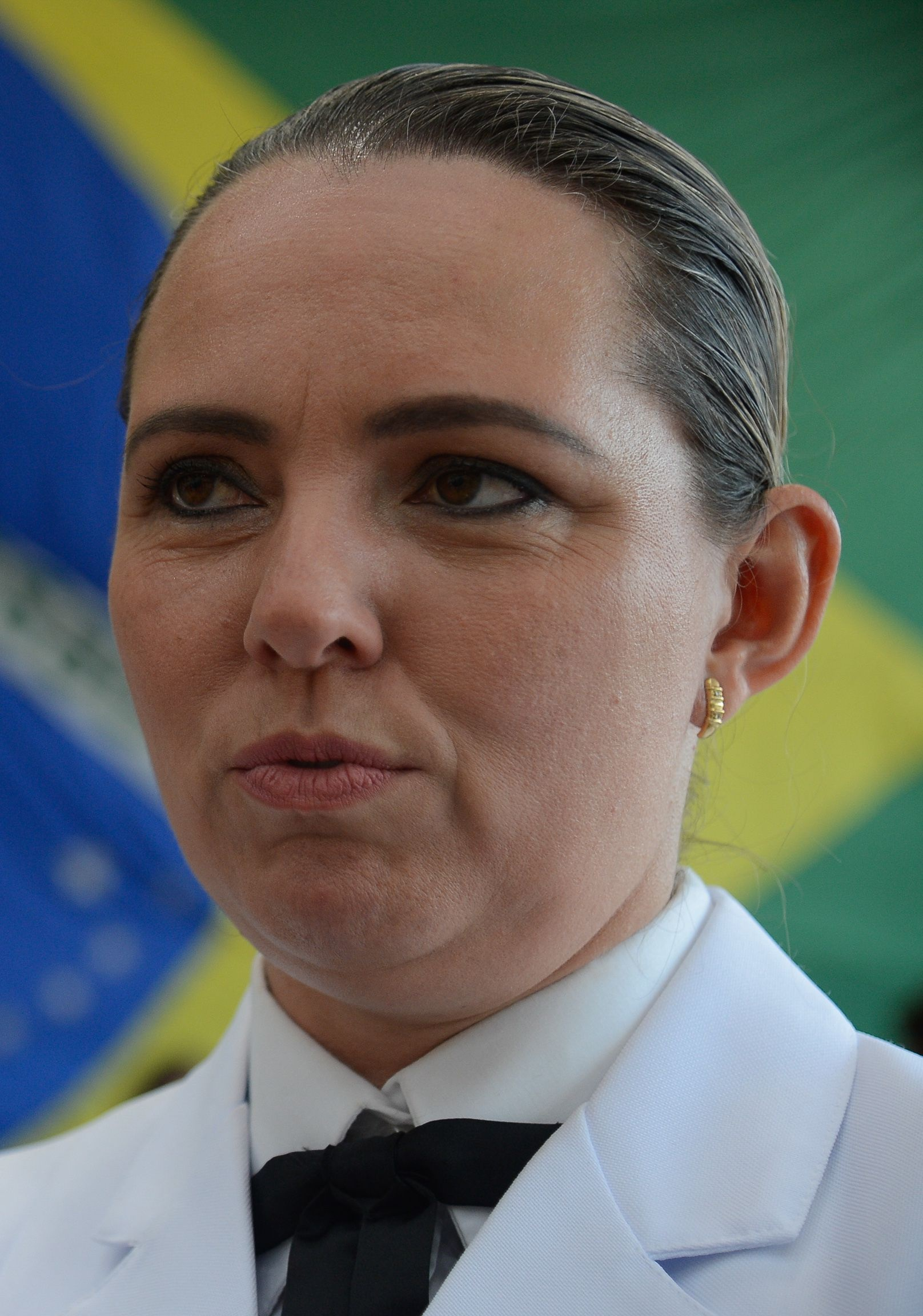
- Rosane Sibele Budag Ewald in 2017

Personal information
- Born: 27 August 1973 (age 52)

Sport
- Sport: Sports shooting

Rosane Ewald (born 27 August 1973) is a Brazilian sports shooter. She competed in the women's 10 metre air rifle event at the 2016 Summer Olympics.
