= Diana Cabrera =

Uruguayan-Canadian sports shooter

Personal information
- Born: 18 March 1984 (age 42) Toronto, Canada
- Education: Centennial College
- Height: 1.61 m (5 ft 3 in)

Sport
- Sport: Shooting sports
Medal record
Representing Uruguay
South American Games
Bronze medal – third place	2010 Medellin	50m rifle

Diana Valerie Cabrera (born 18 March 1984 in Toronto, Ontario) is a Uruguayan-Canadian sports shooter.

The 1.61-metre (5 ft 3 in) Cabrera, who weighed in at 65 kg (143 lb) in 2015, began shooting in September 1999 at the Scarborough Rifle Club. She initially took up the sport for her father, who feared having to give up his extensive firearms collection due to an illness. He asked her to acquire a possession and acquisition licence (PAL) so she could keep his collection. Cabrera's talent was recognized at the club and she began to shoot competitively.

In 2006, while a student at Centennial College, Cabrera represented Canada for the 2006 Commonwealth Games in the discipline 50-metre rifle. However, she began competing for Uruguay, her parents' home country, which would pay her travel expenses to international events. She continued to live and work in Canada, where she was the office manager for the Canadian Shooting Sports Association (CSSA) at their headquarters in Toronto from 2008 to 2013.

In 2007 she represented the Uruguay national team in the 2007 Pan American Games in Rio de Janeiro. In 2010, Cabrera competed in the 2010 South American Games in Medellin and won the bronze medal in 50-metre rifle, prone, with a score of 573 points. This was the first medal win for Uruguay in this event. In 2012 Cabrera competed at the XIX Campeonato Sudamericano de Tiro Deportivo held in Buenos Aires where she won the silver medal at the 50m-prone event and finished in third place overall, making a comeback in her standings. In 2014 Cabrera competed in both the World Championships and the American Championships. The following year she participated with the Uruguayan team at the 2015 Pan American Games in her home town of Toronto, where she finished in 21st place in both the 10-metre air rifle and the 50-metre rifle events.
