= Yarimar Mercado =

Puerto Rican sports shooter

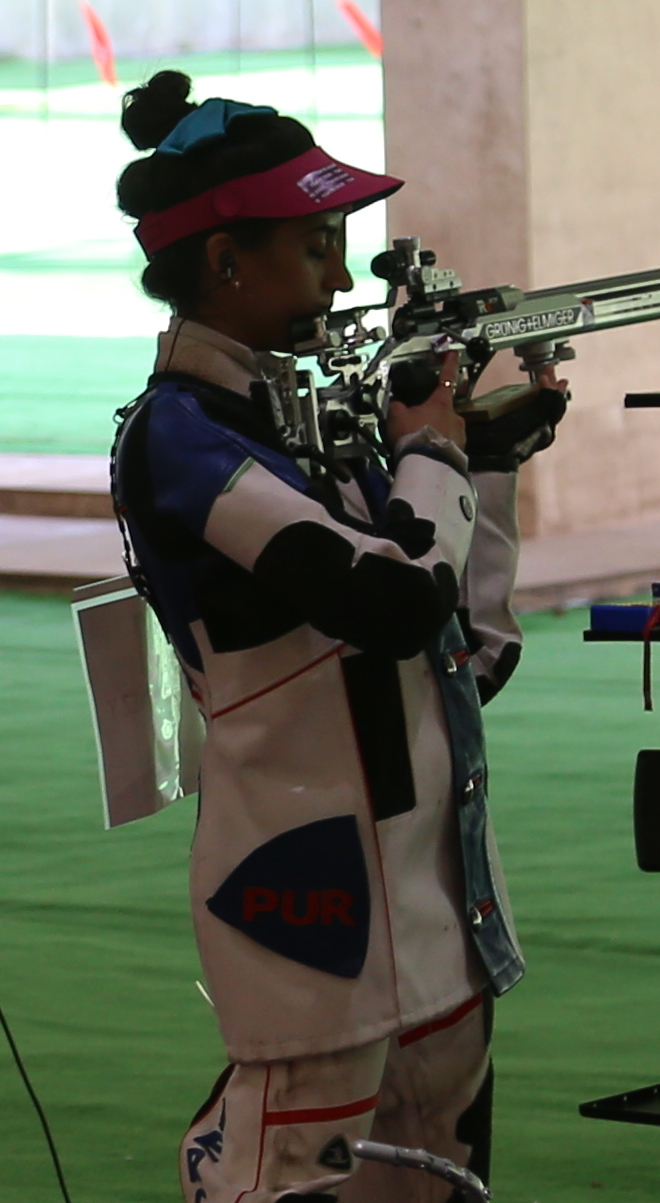
- Yarimar Mercado at the 2020 Summer Olympics

Personal information
- Full name: Yarimar Mercado Martínez
- Nationality: Puerto Rican
- Born: 12 March 1995 (age 31) Yauco, Puerto Rico
- Height: 1.50 m (4 ft 11 in)
- Weight: 48 kg (106 lb)

Sport
- Sport: Shooting
- Event(s): 10 m air rifle (AR40); 50 m rifle 3 positions (STR3X20); 50 m rifle prone (STR60PR)
Medal record
Women's shooting
Representing Puerto Rico
Pan American Games
| Bronze medal – third place | 2015 Toronto | STR3X20 |

Yarimar Mercado Martínez (born March 12, 1995) is a Puerto Rican sports shooter. She competed in the women's 10 metre air rifle event at the 2016 Summer Olympics.

In April 2022, her mother was killed by a stray bullet in her Connecticut home while she was sewing.
