= Catalonia national racquetball team =

Catalonia
- Association: Federació Catalana de Raquetbol
- Confederation: ERF (Europe)
- IRF code: CAT (Catalonia)

World Championships
- Appearances: 2 (First in 2006)
- Best result: Overall: 13th place (2008); Men: 13th place (2008); Women: 13th place (2008)

European Championships
- Appearances: 3 (First in 2007)
- Best result: Overall: winners (2009); Men: winners (2009); Women: winners (2009)

Catalonia national racquetball team represents the Catalan Racquetball Federation in racquetball international competitions. Competes as a member of the European Racquetball Federation and International Racquetball Federation. Catalonia won the European Championships in 2009, in the overall, men and women competitions.

== History ==
IRF World Championships
	Year	Host	Men	Women	Overall
XIII	2006	Dominican Republic	17th	17th	17th
XIV	2008	Ireland	13th	13th	13th
XV	2010	South Korea	–	–	–

ERF European Championships
	Year	Host	Men	Women	Overall
XIV	2007	Italy	3rd	4th	
XV	2009	France	Champions	Champions	Champions
XVI	2011	Germany	–	–	–
XVII	2013	Italy	3rd	3rd	3rd

== Players ==
=== National team at the European Championship 2013 ===
- Ignasi Herms
- Dani Pascual

- Anna Ventura
- Maria Pajares

=== National team in the European Championship 2009 and World Championship 2008 ===
- Víctor Montserrat
- Carlos Oviedo

- Elisabet Consegal
- Raquel Consegal
