= Germany national racquetball team =

Germany
- Association: Deutscher Racquetball Verband e.V.
- Confederation: ERF (Europe)
- IRF code: GER (Germany)

World Championships
- Appearances: 14 (First in 1981)
- Best result: Overall: 4th place (1981); Men: 5th place (1990); Women: 5th place (1984)

European Championships
- Best result: Overall: winners (1993, 1997, 1999, 2005); Men: winners (1991, 1993, 1997, 1999, 2005)

Germany national racquetball team represents the German Racquetball Federation in racquetball international competitions. Competes as a member of the European Racquetball Federation and International Racquetball Federation. Germany has won the European Championships 5 times in men's competition and 4 in overall's.

== History ==
IRF World Championships
	Year	Host	Men	Women	Overall
I	1981	USA	–	–	4th
II	1984	USA	8th	5th	6th
III	1986	USA	9th	12th	11th
IV	1988	Germany	7th	8th	7th
V	1990	Venezuela	5th	13th	8th
VI	1992	Canada	6th	11th	9th
VII	1994	Mexico	11th	13th	10th
VIII	1996	USA	8th	11th	9th
IX	1998	Bolivia	7th	–	14th
X	2000	Mexico	12th	15th	11th
XI	2002	Puerto Rico	25th	11th	16th
XII	2004	South Korea	13th	–	17th
XIII	2006	Dominican Republic	14th	13th	12th
XIV	2008	Ireland	12th	10th	12th
XV	2010	South Korea	–	–	–

== Players ==
National team in the European Championship 2009

- Oliver Bertels
- Eric Gordon
- Arne Schmitz
- Bernd Dröge

- Andrea Gordon
- Yvonne Kortes
- Lara Ludwig

National team in the World Championship 2008

- Oliver Bertels
- Marcel Czempisz
- Joachim Loof
- Trevor Meyer

- Andrea Gordon
- Yvonne Kortes
- Lara Ludwig
