= Belgium national racquetball team =

Belgium
- Association: Belgian Racquetball Federation
- Confederation: ERF (Europe)
- IRF code: BEL (Belgium)

World Championships
- Appearances: 11 (First in 1984)
- Best result: Overall: 9th place (1988); Men: 10th place (1984); Women: 8th place (1984)

Belgium national racquetball team represents the Belgian Racquetball Federation in racquetball international competitions. Is a member of the European Racquetball Federation since 1985 and International Racquetball Federation. Ireland has won the European Championships 9 times in women's competition, 7 times in overall's and 5 in men's competition.

== History ==
IRF World Championships
	Year	Host	Men	Women	Overall
II	1984	USA	10th	8th	10th
III	1986	USA	14th	10th	12th
IV	1988	Germany	15th	11th	9th
V	1990	Venezuela	24th	12th	16th
VI	1992	Canada	18th	12th	13th
VII	1994	Mexico	18th	16th	14th
VIII	1996	USA	–	–	–
IX	1998	Bolivia	14th	–	18th
X	2000	Mexico	22nd	22nd	21st
XI	2002	Puerto Rico	22nd	–	22nd
XII	2004	South Korea	–	–	–
XIII	2006	Dominican Republic	18th	–	18th
XIV	2008	Ireland	19th	–	20th
XV	2010	South Korea			

== Players ==
National team in the European Championship 2009

- Paul Devos
- Bart Wouters
- Niklaas Deboutte
