= Italy national racquetball team =

Italy
- Association: Federazione Italiana Racquetball
- Confederation: ERF (Europe)
- IRF code: ITA (Italy)

World Championships
- Appearances: 2 (First in 1992)
- Best result: Overall: 18th place (2006); Men: 18th place (2006); Women: 16th place (1992)

The Italy national racquetball team represents the Federazione Italiana Racquetball in racquetball international competitions. Is a member of the European Racquetball Federation and International Racquetball Federation.

== History ==
IRF World Championships
	Year	Host	Men	Women	Overall
VI	1992	Canada	–	16th	21st
VII	1994	Mexico	–	–	–
VIII	1996	USA	–	–	–
IX	1998	Bolivia	–	–	–
X	2000	Mexico	–	–	–
XI	2002	Puerto Rico	–	–	–
XII	2004	South Korea	–	–	–
XIII	2006	Dominican Republic	18th	–	18th
XIV	2008	Ireland	–	–	–
XV	2010	South Korea	–	–	–

== Players ==
National team in World Championships 1992 Montreal, Canada

- Nadia Verilli

National team in the European Championships 1997 Hamburg

- Jacopo Sasso
- Pasquale De Nora

National team in the European Championships 1999 Bad Tölz

- Jacopo Sasso
- Bruno Aletta

National team in the European Championships 2009

- Benedetto Zonca
- Cristobal Accorsi
