= Netherlands national racquetball team =

Netherlands
- Association: Nederlandse Racquetball Associatie
- Confederation: ERF (Europe)
- IRF code: NED (Netherlands)

World Championships
- Appearances: 14 (First in 1981)
- Best result: Overall: 3rd place (1984); Men: 5th place (1984); Women: 3rd place (1984)

European Championships
- Best result: Overall: winners (3 times); Men: winners (2 times); Women: winners (once)

The Netherlands national racquetball team represents the Nederlandse Racquetball Associatie in racquetball international competitions. Is a member of the European Racquetball Federation and International Racquetball Federation. The Netherlands has won the European Championships 3 times in overall's competition, 2 times in men's and 1 in women's competition.

== History ==
IRF World Championships
	Year	Host	Men	Women	Overall
I	1981	USA	–	–	5th
II	1984	USA	5th	3rd	3rd
III	1986	USA	6th	7th	7th
IV	1988	Germany	9th	3rd	5th
V	1990	Venezuela	10th	8th	8th
VI	1992	Canada	8th	10th	10th
VII	1994	Mexico	12th	–	17th
VIII	1996	USA	13th	15th	14th
IX	1998	Bolivia	16th	15th	13th
X	2000	Mexico	15th	–	24th
XI	2002	Puerto Rico	15th	–	19th
XII	2004	South Korea	12th	–	15th
XIII	2006	Dominican Republic	16th	16th	16th
XIV	2008	Ireland	10th	–	16th
XV	2010	South Korea	–	–	–

== Players ==
National team in the European Championships 2009

- Pascal Matla
- Peter De Jong
- Edwin Schipper
