= France national racquetball team =

France
- Association: Fédération Française de Racquetball
- Confederation: ERF (Europe)
- IRF code: FRA (France)

World Championships
- Appearances: 6 (First in 1986)
- Best result: Overall: 10th place (1988); Men: 11th place (1986); Women: 8th place (1986)

France national racquetball team represents the Fédération Française de Racquetball in racquetball international competitions. It is a member of the European Racquetball Federation and International Racquetball Federation.

== History ==
IRF World Championships
	Year	Host	Men	Women	Overall
III	1986	USA	11th	8th	11th
IV	1988	Germany	17th	10th	10th
V	1990	Venezuela	–	–	–
VI	1992	Canada	14th	–	20th
VII	1994	Mexico	–	–	–
VIII	1996	USA	–	–	–
IX	1998	Bolivia	–	–	–
X	2000	Mexico	–	–	–
XI	2002	Puerto Rico	31st	–	31st
XII	2004	South Korea	–	–	23rd
XIII	2006	Dominican Republic	–	11th	21st
XIV	2008	Ireland	–	–	–
XV	2010	South Korea			

== Players ==
National team in the European Championship 2009

- Philippe Lecomte
- David Roques
- Benjamin Teinturier
- Nicolas Mufraggi
