= Ireland national racquetball team =

National Raquetball team for the Republic of Ireland

Ireland
- Association: Racquetball Association of Ireland
- Confederation: ERF (Europe)
- IRF code: IRL (Republic of Ireland)

World Championships
- Appearances: 20 (First in 1981)
- Best result: Overall: 6th place (1981,1986,1988,1990); Men: 5th place (1986,1990,1992); Women: 2nd place (1981)

European Championships
- Appearances: 20 (First in 1981)
- Best result: Overall: winners (1983,1985,1991,1995,2001,2003,2007,2013,2017,2019); Men: winners (1983,1985,2001,2003,2007,2013,2017,2019); Women: winners (1983,1985,1989,1991,1993,1995,2003,2005,2007,2013,2017,2019,2023,2025)

Ireland national racquetball team represents Ireland and the Racquetball Association of Ireland in racquetball international competitions. It competes as a member of the European Racquetball Federation and International Racquetball Federation. Ireland has won the European Championships 8 times in men's competition, 13 times in women's competition and 10 times overall.

== History ==
IRF World Championships
	Year	Host	Men	Women	Overall
I	1981	USA	4th	2nd	6th
II	1984	USA	–	–	–
III	1986	USA	7th	5th	6th
IV	1988	Germany	8th	6th	6th
V	1990	Venezuela	12th	5th	6th
VI	1992	Canada	10th	5th	7th
VII	1994	Mexico	15th	–	20th
VIII	1996	USA	14th	–	16th
IX	1998	Bolivia	15th	11th	10th
X	2000	Mexico	19th	13th	17th
XI	2002	Puerto Rico	21st	14th	15th
XII	2004	South Korea	–	–	–
XIII	2006	Dominican Republic	12th	10th	11th
XIV	2008	Ireland	9th	11th	10th
XV	2010	South Korea	15th of 21	9th of 21	13th of 21
XVI	2012	Dominican Republic	13th of 22	–	16th of 22
XVII	2014	Canada	15th of 21	14th of 17	15th of 21
XVIII	2016	Colombia	-	14th of 16	16th of 18
XIX	2018	Costa Rica	15th of 18	13th of 15	14th of 18
XX	2021	Guatemala	11th of 14	10th of 13	12th of 14
XXI	2022	Mexico	-	-	-
XXII	2024	San Antonio, USA	13th of 16	13th of 13	13th of 16
XXIII	2026	Temuco, Chile	11th of 13	11th of 11	11th of 13

European_Racquetball_Championships
	Year	Host	Men	Women	Overall
I	1981	Netherlands			
II	1983	Germany			
III	1985	Belgium	1st	1st	1st
IV	1987	Netherlands			
V	1989	France		1st	
VI	1991	Belgium		1st	1st
VII	1995	Ireland	2nd	1st	1st
VIII	1997	Germany		-	
IX	1999	Germany		-	
X	2001	Ireland	1st	-	1st
XI	2003	Netherlands	1st	1st	1st
XII	2005	Germany		1st	
XIII	2007	Italy	1st	1st	-
XIV	2009	France	3rd	3rd	-
XV	2011	Germany	2nd	2nd	-
XVI	2013	Italy	1st	1st	1st
XVII	2015	Germany	-	-	-
XVIII	2017	Netherlands	1st	1st	1st
XIX	2019	Germany	1st	1st	1st
XX	2021	No Event	-	-	-
XXI	2023	Germany	2nd	1st	-
XXII	2025	Switzerland	2nd	1st	-
