= 2015 European Racquetball Championships =

Tournament details
- Dates: 24 - 27 June
- Edition: 18
- Nations: 3
- Venue: Sport Department
- Location: Hamburg, Germany

- XVIII Racquetball European Championships: Germany 2015 -
- Men's Single
Champion	(Germany) Oliver Bertels
Runner-up	(Germany) Arne Schmitz
- Women's Single
Champion	(Germany) Andrea Gordon
Runner-up	(Germany) Lara Ludwig
- Men's Doubles
Champions	(Germany) O. Bertels / A. Schmitz
Runner-up	(Germany) A. Dietrich / (Austria) Jan Lysakowski
- Women's Doubles
Champions	(Germany) L. Ludwig / A. Gordon
Runner-up	(Germany) C. Hoenig / R. Hartmann

The XVIII Racquetball European Championships were held in Hamburg, (Germany) from June 24–27, 2015, with only 3 countries represented. The EURO 2015 were under the patronage of the city of Hamburg.

The venue was the Sport Department, in Hamburg, with 3 regulation racquetball courts. In addition to the European Championships, the European Racquetball Masters and Junior Racquetball Championships were held at the same time.

The opening ceremony was on June 24 with the president of European Racquetball Federation, Mike Mesecke, and the president of German Racquetball Federation, Jörg Ludwig.

== Men's Singles Competition ==
First round
1	O. Bertels (GER)
8	S. Langmeier (GER)	15	15
9	P. Rakowski (POL)	0	0
5	A. Dietrich (GER)	9	15	11
12	A. Kisicki (GER)	15	9	0
13	Florian Mosshammer (GER)	2	3
4	M. Mesecke(GER)	15	15
3	Jan Lysakowski (AUT)
6	M. Scheffler (GER)	15	15
11	C. Czempisz (GER)	0	0
7	S. Macaluso (GER)	15	15
10	N. Krieger (GER)	11	9
2	A. Schmitz (GER)

Quarterfinals
1	O. Bertels	15	15
8	S. Langmeier	5	1
5	A. Dietrich	12	8
4	M. Mesecke	15	15
3	J. Lysakowski	15	15
6	M. Scheffler	6	10
7	S. Macaluso	0	6
2	A. Schmitz	15	15

Semifinals
1	O. Bertels	15	15
4	M. Mesecke	0	6
3	J. Lysakowski	6	4
4	A. Schmitz	15	15

Final
1	O. Bertels	15	15
2	A. Schmitz	8	1

Winner
OLIVER BERTELS (Germany)

== Ladies Singles Competition ==
Ladies Singles	W	L	GW	GL
(Germany) Renate Hartmann	0	2	0	6
(Germany) Lara Ludwig	1	1	2	2
(Germany) Andrea Gordon	2	0	6	0

Winner
ANDREA GORDON (Germany)

== Men's Doubles Competition ==
First round
1	A. Schmitz / O. Bertels (GER)
8	T. Scheffler / L. Kock (GER)	0	0
9	A. Kisicki / A. Dobberstein (GER)	15	15
5	C. Czempisz / F. Mosshammer (GER)
12
13
4	T. Krieger / N. Krieger (GER)
3	A. Dietrich / J Lysakowski (GER) (AUT)
6	F. Süchting / Süchting (GER)
11	0	0
7	S. Langmeier / S. Macaluso (GER)	11	15	2
10	P. Rakowski / V. Farrier (POL)(GER)	15	5	11
2	M. Scheffler / M. Mesecke (GER)

Quarterfinals
1	A. Schmitz / O. Bertels	15	15
8	A. Kisicki / A. Dobberstein	1	1
5	Czempisz / Mosshammer	5	15	6
4	Krieger / Krieger	15	11	6
3	Dietrich / Lysakowski	15	15
6	Süchting / Süchting	8	7
7	Rakowski /Farrier	w	b	f
2	Scheffler / Mesecke

Semifinals
1	Schmitz / Bertels	15	15
4	Krieger /Krieger	2	1
3	Dietrich / Lysakowski	6	15	11
4	Rakowski / Farrier	15	14	4

Final
1	Schmitz / Bertels	15	15
2	Dietrich / Lysakowski	6	13

Winner
ARNE SCHMITZ & OLIVER BERTELS (Germany)

== Ladies Doubles Competition ==
Final
1	A. Gordon / L. Ludwig (GER)	15	15
2	C. Hoening / R. Hartmann (GER)	1	1

Winner
ANDREA GORDON & LARA LUDWIG (Germany)

== See also ==
- European Racquetball Championships
