= European Racquetball Tour =

The European Racquetball Tour (ERT) is composed by several racquetball tournaments in Europe. It was established in 1999 and is promoted by the European Racquetball Federation.

== 2017–2018 season ==
European Racquetball Tour 2017-2018
Event	Men's singles	Women's singles	Men's doubles	Women's doubles
(Republic of Ireland) Irish & Kilkenny Open; Oct. 21-12, 2017 - Kilkenny	(Republic of Ireland) Noel O Callaghan	(Republic of Ireland) Donna Ryder	(Republic of Ireland) Ray Breen (Republic of Ireland) Mark Murphy	(Republic of Ireland) Kate Ryan (Republic of Ireland) Anne Beckett
(Germany) Hamburg Open; Oct. 27-28, 2017 - Hamburg	(Germany) Trevor Meyer	(Republic of Ireland) Donna Ryder	(Germany) Marcel Czempisz (Germany) Joachim Loof	-
(Netherlands) Dutch Open; Mar 16-18, 2018 - The Hague	(Germany) Marcel Czempisz	(Netherlands) Maaike Weerdesteyn	(Netherlands) Edwin Schipper (Netherlands) Pascal Matla	
(Republic of Ireland) Castlebar Open; Mar. 24-25, 2018 - Castlebar	(Republic of Ireland) Noel O Callaghan	(Republic of Ireland) Aisling Hickey	(Republic of Ireland) Noel O Callaghan (Republic of Ireland) Eoin Tynan	(Republic of Ireland) S Ainsworth (United States) S Lynch
(Germany) German Open; Apr 07-08, 2018 - Hamburg	(Germany) Oliver Bertels	(Germany) Yvonne Mesecke	(Germany) Oliver Bertels (Germany) André Dietrich	
(Republic of Ireland) Arklow Irish Open; Apr 14-15, 2018 - Arklow	(Republic of Ireland) Mark Murphy	(Republic of Ireland) Aisling Hickey	(Republic of Ireland) Mark Murphy (Republic of Ireland) Stevie Quinn	(Republic of Ireland) Majella Haverty (Republic of Ireland) Katie Kenny
(Italy) Italian Open; May 26–27, 2018 - Brembate	(Germany) Marcel Czempisz	(Italy) Consuelo del Prato	(Ecuador) Daniel Alvarez (United States) J.D. Lattuca	

== 2014–2015 season ==
European Racquetball Tour 2014-2015
Event	Men's singles	Women's singles	Men's doubles	Women's doubles
(Germany) Hamburg Open; Oct. 11-12, 2014 - Hamburg	(Germany) Oliver Bertels	(Mexico) Luisa Aldrete	(Germany) Oliver Bertels (Germany) Arne Schmitz	-
(Germany) Angel Tree Tournament * Dec.06-07, 2014 - Wiesbaden	(Germany) Oliver Bertels	(Germany) Lara Ludwig		
(France) Paris Open; Jan. 23-25, 2015 - Nanterre	(Republic of Ireland) Gary Lynch			
(Republic of Ireland) Castlebar Open * Mar. 28-29, 2015 - Castlebar	(Republic of Ireland) Mark Murphy	(Republic of Ireland) Donna Ryder	(Republic of Ireland) Mark Murphy (Republic of Ireland) Stevie Quinn	
(Germany) German Open; Mar. 20-22, 2015 - Hamburg	(Germany) Arne Schmitz	(Germany) Manuela Dietrich	(Germany) Oliver Bertels (Germany) Arne Schmitz	
(Italy) Italian Open; Apr 18-19, 2015 - Brembate	(Republic of Ireland) Noel O Callaghan	(Italy) ?		
(Republic of Ireland) Arklow Irish Open; May 2–3, 2015 - Arklow	(Republic of Ireland) Noel O'Callaghan	(Republic of Ireland) Aisling Hickey	(Republic of Ireland) Mark Murphy (Republic of Ireland) Pat Hanley	(Republic of Ireland) Susan Farrell (Republic of Ireland) Toni Neary
(Germany) Bavarian Open; May 15–17, 2015 - Bad Tölz	(United States) Ed Acuavera	(Germany) Simone Jorczik	(Germany) Oliver Bertels (Germany) Arne Schmitz	

- Satellite level

== 2009–2010 season ==
European Racquetball Tour 2009-2010
Event	Men's singles	Women's singles	Men's doubles	Women's doubles
(Germany) Hamburg Open; Sep.25-27, 2009 - Hamburg	(Canada) Vincent Gagnon	(Germany) Yvonne Kortes	(Germany) Joachim Loof (Germany) Trevor Meyer	-
(Netherlands) Dutch Open; Oct. 23-25, 2009 - Schinnen	cancelled	cancelled		
(Belgium) Belgian Open; Nov.21-22, 2009 - Brussels	(Bolivia) Humberto Morales	(United States) Angela Burth		
(Germany) Angel Tree Tournament * Dec.12-13, 2009 - Heidelberg	(United States) Mike Bowers	(Germany) Yvonne Kortes		
(Catalonia) Catalan Open; Dec. 11-13, 2009 - Barcelona	(Catalonia) Víctor Montserrat	(Catalonia) Elisabet Consegal		
(Italy) Italian Open; Mar. 5-6, 2010 - Brembate	(France) Philippe Lecomte	(United States) Angela Burth		
(Turkey) Turkish Open; Mar. 19-22, 2010 - Istanbul	(Canada) Bernard Guys	(Turkey) Ayten Keçeci		
(Republic of Ireland) Castlebar Open * Mar. 21-22, 2010 - Castlebar		(Republic of Ireland) Donna Ryder		(Republic of Ireland) Ciara McManamon (Republic of Ireland) Clodagh McManamon
(Germany) German Open; Mar. 26-28, 2010 - Hamburg	(Germany) Oliver Bertels	(United States) Angela Burth	(Germany) Oliver Bertels (Germany) Mike Mesecke	
(Republic of Ireland) Arklow Irish Open; Apr. 30-May 3, 2010 - Arklow	(Republic of Ireland) Noel O'Callaghan	(Republic of Ireland) Donna Ryder	(Republic of Ireland) Adam Neary (Republic of Ireland) Noel O'Callaghan	(Republic of Ireland) Majella Haverty (Republic of Ireland) Katie Kenny
(Germany) Bad Tölz Open; May 14–16, 2010 - Bad Tölz	(Germany) Oliver Bertels	(Germany) Yvonne Kortes	(United States) Victor Farrier (United States) Michael Dufrene	
(France) French Open; Jun. 12-13, 2010 - Nanterre	(France) Philippe Lecomte	(United States) Angela Burth	(Bolivia) Verduguez (France) Philippe Lecomte	

- Satellite level

== 2008–2009 season ==
European Racquetball Tour 2008-2009
Event	Men's singles	Women's singles	Men's doubles	Women's doubles
(Netherlands) Dutch Open; Oct. 10-12, 2008	(Netherlands) Pascal Matla		(Netherlands) Pascal Matla (Netherlands) Edwin Schipper	
(Germany) Hamburg Open; Oct.31-Nov.2, 2008 - Hamburg	(Germany) Martin Klippel	(Germany) Yvonne Kortes	(Germany) Oliver Bertels (Germany) Martin Klippel	
(Belgium) Belgian Open; Nov.21-23, 2008 - Brussels	(Germany) Arne Schmitz		(Germany) Oliver Bertels (Germany) Arne Schmitz	
(Catalonia) Catalan Open; Dec. 19-21, 2008 - Barcelona	(Catalonia) Víctor Montserrat	(Bolivia) Marioli Caballero		
(France) French Open; Jan. 17-18, 2009 - Nanterre-Paris	(United States) Cliff Swain			
(Turkey) Turkish Open	(Germany) Trevor Meyer			
(Italy) 4th Italian Open; Mar. 7-1, 2009 - Brembate	(Catalonia) Albert Serfaty	(Italy) Consuelo Del Prato	(Catalonia) Albert Serfaty (Venezuela) Ricardo Soto	
(Germany) 28th German Open; Apr. 3-5, 2009 - Hamburg	(Germany) Martin Klippel	(Germany) Yvonne Kortes	(Germany) Joachim Loof (Germany) Trevor Meyer	-
(Republic of Ireland) 25th Arklow Irish Open; May. 1-4, 2009 - Arklow	(Republic of Ireland) Noel O'Callaghan	(Republic of Ireland) Toni Neary	(Republic of Ireland) Adam Neary (Republic of Ireland) Noel O'Callaghan	(Republic of Ireland) Toni Neary (Republic of Ireland) Geraldine Byrne

== 2007–2008 season ==
European Racquetball Tour 2007-2008
Event	Men's singles	Women's singles	Men's doubles	Women's doubles
(Germany) 24th Hamburg Open; Sep.21-23, 2007 - Hamburg	(Germany) Joachim Loof	(United States) Sallie Benedict	(Germany) Joachim Loof (Germany) Trevor Meyer	-
(Catalonia) Barcelona Trophy; Nov. 1-4, 2007 - Barcelona	(Catalonia) Víctor Montserrat	(Catalonia) Anna Ventura	(Catalonia) Víctor Montserrat (Catalonia) Ignasi Pérez	-
(Belgium) 22nd Belgian Open; Nov. 17-18, 2007 Antwerp	(United States) Tim Hardison			
(France) French Open; Jan. 12-13, 2008	(Catalonia) Carlos Oviedo	(Germany) Yvonne Kortes	(Germany) Joachim Loof (Germany) Trevor Meyer	
(Italy) 3rd Italian Open; Mar. 8-9, 2008 - Brembate	(Catalonia) Víctor Montserrat	(Germany) Yvonne Kortes	(Catalonia) Carlos Oviedo (Catalonia) Albert Serfaty	-
(Germany) 27th German Open; Apr. 4-6, 2008 - Hamburg	(Germany) Martin Klippel	(Germany) Yvonne Kortes	(Germany) Joachim Loof (Germany) Trevor Meyer	(Germany) Yvonne Kortes (Germany) Y. Welsch
(Turkey) Turkish Open; Mar. 28-30, 2008 - Istanbul	(Catalonia) Carlos Oviedo	(Turkey) Ayten Kececi		
(Republic of Ireland) 24th Arklow Irish Open; May. 2-5, 2008 - Arklow	(Catalonia) Carlos Oviedo	(Republic of Ireland) Geraldine Byrne	(Republic of Ireland) Liam Hughes (Republic of Ireland) Noel O'Callaghan	(Republic of Ireland) Toni Neary (Republic of Ireland) Geraldine Byrne
