= Jennifer Saunders (racquetball) =

Canadian racquetball player

- Saunders at 2006 World Championships

Personal information
- Nickname: Jen
- Nationality: Canadian
- Born: November 18, 1976 (age 49) Thompson, Manitoba
- Height: 5 ft 7 in (170 cm)
- Weight: 75 kg (165 lb)

Sport
- Sport: Racquetball
- Turned pro: 2001
- Coached by: Ron Brown (1999–2009), Evan Pritchard (2009–2012), Sue Swaine (2012–2013), Cliff Swain (2013–2015), Corey Osborne, (2017–2019)
- Retired: 2019

Achievements and titles
- World finals: 2nd (2002, 2012)
- National finals: 1st (Women's Singles: 2002, 2005, 2009–2014, 2016, 2018–2019, Women's Doubles: 2003–2007, 2009, 2011–2015, 2018-2019)
- Highest world ranking: LPRT – 7th (2010–11, 2011–12)
Medal record
Women's Racquetball
Representing Canada
World Championships
Bronze medal – third place	2016 Cali	Doubles
Silver medal – second place	2012 Santo Domingo	Singles
Bronze medal – third place	2012 Santo Domingo	Women's Team
Silver medal – second place	2010 Seoul	Women's Team
Bronze medal – third place	2008 Kingscourt	Singles
Bronze medal – third place	2008 Kingscourt	Women's Team
Bronze medal – third place	2006 Santo Domingo	Singles
Silver medal – second place	2006 Santo Domingo	Women's Team
Bronze medal – third place	2004 Anyang	Doubles
Bronze medal – third place	2004 Anyang	Women's Team
Silver medal – second place	2002 Puerto Rico	Singles
Pan Am Championships
Bronze medal – third place	2019 Barranquilla	Doubles
Bronze medal – third place	2016 San Luis Potosi	Doubles
Bronze medal – third place	2012 Temuco	Doubles
Silver medal – second place	2010 San Pedro Sula	Singles
Bronze medal – third place	2008 San Jose	Singles
Silver medal – second place	2004 Cuenca	Doubles
Pan American Games
Bronze medal – third place	2015 Toronto	Women's team

Jennifer "Jen" Saunders (born November 18, 1976) is a Canadian retired racquetball player from Winnipeg, Manitoba. In her last Canadian Championships in 2019, Saunders won both Women's Singles, for a record extending 11th time, and Women's Doubles, for a 13th time. Her 11 Canadian Women's Singles Championships and 24 combined Canadian Women's Singles and Doubles Championships are Canadian women's records. Saunders was the 2009 Manitoba Female Athlete of the Year as voted by the Manitoba Sportswriters and Sportscasters Association. Saunders announced her retirement from competition in December 2019, as she accepted the position of Administrator of High Performance and Sport Development with Racquetball Canada. In July 2020, Saunders was named as one of the 2020 inductees into the Manitoba Sports Hall of Fame.

== Personal life ==
Saunders was born in Thompson, Manitoba, to Ed and Ruth Saunders, the youngest of their three girls. Growing up in Thompson, she began playing racquetball at age 10. Saunders moved to Winnipeg to attend the University of Winnipeg, where she earned a Bachelor of Arts degree in Physical Activity and Sport Studies in 1999. She was hired by Racquetball Manitoba in 1999 as program coordinator, and she is now their executive director.

Saunders was a referee at the 1999 Pan American Games in Winnipeg, as well as the 2000 World Championships. She was recognized by Racquetball Canada for this work with the Women's Award in 2000 (co-winner with Valari Hendrickson).

== Racquetball career ==
=== 1996–2002 ===
Saunders's racquetball career started slowly. "I wasn't very good as a teenager playing racquetball," said Saunders, and "when I was 18, people laughed at me when I said I wanted to be on the national team." At 19, She won Women's A at the 1996 Canadian Championships in Montreal. Despite that win, Saunders wasn't ranked in the top 50 women players in Canada at age 20.

She then won back-to-back Mixed Doubles A Division titles, in 1997 with François Viens and in 1998 with Trent Foley.

Competing in the Women's Open Doubles division at the 1999 Canadian Championships, Saunders and partner Julie Neubauer won the consolation title. They followed that with a 4th-place finish at the 2000 Canadian Championships.

Saunders got to her first significant result in Women's Singles at the Canadian Championships in 2001, when she was the 6th seed yet reached the final by defeating Lori-Jane Powell in the semi-finals, 11–6, 11–0, 11–2, but lost the final to Josée Grand'Maître, 11–5, 11–6, 11–7. Saunders again played Women's Doubles with Neubauer, and they finished 5th.

Saunders made Team Canada for the first time in 2002, when she played Women's Singles at the 2002 Pan American Championships (then called Tournament of the Americas) in Cochabomba, Bolivia. Saunders finished 4th, as she lost to American Laura Fenton in the semi-finals, and then lost to American Rhonda Rajsich in the 3rd place match.

After being a finalist in Women's Singles at Nationals in 2001, Saunders went one better at the 2002 Canadian Championships, as she captured her first Women's Singles title. She defeated Neubauer in the quarterfinals, 15–7, 15–4, Powell in the semi-finals, 15–10, 15–6, and Grand'Maître in the final, 15–12, 15–4. Afterwards, Saunders, then 25, said "it's something I've worked on for so long and it's so unbelievable. I couldn't imagine it could go any better." She came 3rd in Women's Doubles playing with Powell, as they lost in the semi-finals to Grand'Maître and Chantal Turgeon, 15–10, 15–9, in the semi-finals, then beat Neubauer and Véronique Guillemette for 3rd, 15–7, 15–11.

Her Canadian Championship qualified her to play in the Racquetball World Championships for the first time. Saunders played Women's Singles for Canada at the 2002 World Championships in Puerto Rico, where she was the silver medalist. Saunders reached the final by defeating the USA's Laura Fenton, 15–6, 7–15, 11–3, in the semi-finals, but in the final she lost to USA veteran Cheryl Gudinas, 15–13, 15–13.

=== 2003–2008 ===
In 2003, Saunders and Josée Grand'Maître started playing Women's Doubles together, and it became the most successful partnership in Canadian racquetball history, as they won 10 Canadian Championships together. Their first Women's Doubles title was at the 2003 Canadian Championships. They defeated Saunders's former doubles partners Powell and Neubauer, who played together that year, in the final, 15–6, 8–15, 11–8. But Saunders didn't successfully defend her Women's Singles title, although she did get to the final for a third straight year. In the semi-finals, Saunders beat Grand'Maître in the semi-finals, 15–7, 15–8, but in the final, she narrowly lost to Powell, 8–15, 15–4, 13–11.

Her performances helped to earn Saunders a spot on Team Canada at the 2003 Pan American Games in Santo Domingo, Dominican Republic. She played Women's Singles, but lost in the quarterfinals to teammate Lori-Jane Powell, 15–14, 14–15, 11–1. The Canadians met in the quarters because Saunders didn't win her pool, losing two matches: one to Angela Grisar of Chile, 15–3, 14–15 11–5, and one to Claudine Garcia of the Dominican Republic, 11–15, 15–7, 11–6. while Powell won all her pool matches and claimed the 2nd seed for the medal round playoffs.

The 2004 Canadian Championships played out as they did in 2003. Saunders and Grand'Maître won Women's Doubles for the second time, defeating Powell and Neubauer in the final, 15–9, 15–8, and Geneviève Brodeur and Véronique Guillemette in the semi-finals, 15–2, 15–2. But in Women's Singles, Saunders lost the final to Powell, 15–13, 15–13. She reached the final by defeating Grand'Maître in the semis, 9–15, 15–12, 11–7.

At the 2004 World Championships in Anyang, South Korea, Saunders played Women's Doubles with Grand'Maître, and they finished with bronze medals, as they lost to Mexicans Susana Acosta and Rosy Torres, 8–15, 15–5, 11–4. In the Women's Team event, Saunders and her Canadian teammates got silver, losing to Team USA in the final.

Saunders won both Women's Singles and Doubles at the 2005 Canadian Championships. She and Grand'Maître won their 3rd straight doubles title, again defeating Powell and Neubauer, 15–12, 11–15, 11–2. In the singles semi-finals, Saunders defeated Grand'Maître, 15–7, 15–8, and then beat Linda Ellerington in the final, 15–3, 11–15, 11–1 to win her second Women's Singles Canadian Championship.

Saunders's accomplishments in 2005 got her nominated for the 2005 Manitoba Female Athlete of the year finalist.

Saunders and Grand'Maître won their 4th Canadian Championship in Women's Doubles in 2006, when they again defeated Powell and Neubauer in the final, 15–8, 15–0. However, in Women's Singles, Saunders lost the final to Christie Van Hees, 15–11, 15–11.

Saunders made her third appearance at the World Championships in 2006 in Santo Domingo, Dominican Republic. She played Women's Singles, defeating Mexican Paola Longoria in the quarterfinals, 15–6 15–5, but losing to Angela Grisar of Chile in the semi-finals, 15–9, 15–6, resulting in a bronze medal. In the Women's Team event, Team Canada got silver as they lost the final to the USA two matches to one, including Saunders's loss to Cheryl Gudinas, 15–12, 15–4.

Saunders competed in Women's Singles at the 2007 Pan American Championships in Santiago, Chile, where she lost to Paola Longoria in the quarterfinals.

Saunders's results at the 2007 Canadian Championships mirrored 2006, as she and Grand'Maître won their 5th Canadian Championship in Women's Doubles, but she again lost the final of Women's Singles to Van Hees. Her performances were recognized with a nomination for 2007 Manitoba Female Athlete of the Year.

In 2008, Saunders played Women's Singles at the Pan American Championships in San Jose, Costa Rica, where she was a bronze medalist after losing in the semi-finals to Paola Longoria of Mexico, 15–6, 6–15, 11–10.

Saunders was runner up in both Women's Singles and Doubles at the 2008 Canadian Championships in Burlington, Ontario, which was the first year she hadn't won at least one of those titles since 2001. She won the first game of the Women's Singles final versus Van Hees, but lost in a tie-breaker, 14–16, 15–7, 11–0. Saunders and Grand'Maître lost the Women's Doubles final to Geneviève Brodeur and Véronique Guillemette, 10–15, 16–14, 11–9. Indeed, that year Saunders and Grand'Maître needed a tie-breaker just to get to the final, as they went three games in the semi-finals versus Alison Schlichemeyer and Brandi Jacobson Prentice, winning 15–9, 14–16, 11–3.

At the 2008 World Championships in Kingscourt, Ireland, Saunders was 4th in Women's Singles, and 3rd in the Women's Team event. In singles, she lost in the semi-finals to Cheryl Gudinas of the US, 15–8, 11–15, 11–8, and then lost to Paola Longoria in 3rd place match, 15–9, 15–8. In the Women's Team event, Canada lost to Bolivia in the semi-finals, 3–0, but then defeated Chile, 2–1, for the bronze medal.

=== 2009–2014 ===
Saunders competed in Women's Singles at the 2009 Pan American Championships in Cali, Colombia, losing to Cheryl Gudinas of the US in the quarterfinals, 15–5, 15–10.

Saunders got back in the winner's circle at the 2009 Canadian Championships in Edmonton, as she won both Women's Singles and Doubles. For the first time in the singles final, she played Frédérique Lambert, winning 15–10, 15–8. Saunders and Grand'Maître won Women's Doubles for the 6th time.

Saunders's performances on the women's pro tour results in her finishing 9th at the end of the 2008–09 season.

Saunders competed at the 2009 World Games in Kaoshiung, Taiwan. She defeated Cristina Cordova of Ecuador to reach the quarterfinals, but in the quarters Saunders lost to Angela Grisar of Chile, 15–7, 15–5.

Saunders two Canadian Championships, top 10 pro ranking, and World Games results, led to her being named the 2009 Manitoba Female Athlete of the Year as voted by the Manitoba Sportswriters and Sportscasters Association.

Saunders was a finalist in Women's Singles at the 2010 Pan American Championships in San Pedro Sula, Honduras. She defeated Mexican Nancy Enriquez in the semi-finals, 15–12, 15–11, but lost the final to Enriquez's teammate Paola Longoria, 15–10, 15–11.

Saunders successfully defended her Women's Singles Canadian Championship in 2010 in Burnaby, British Columbia. She defeated Josée Grand'Maître, 15–2, 15–10, in the Women's Singles final. Saunders and Grand'Maître once again teamed up in Women's Doubles, but were defeated by Frédérique Lambert and Brandi Jacobson Prentice, 15–8, 17–19, 11–4.

Saunders travelled to the 2010 World Championships in Seoul, South Korea, where she lost in the quarterfinals to Mexican Nancy Enriquez, 15–9, 15–9. But she was part of the Canadian team that were silver medalists in the Women's Team event, as they got to the final with a win over the home team of South Korea, and then lost to the US in final.

In August 2010, Saunders had her best women's pro tournament result at the 2010 Texas Open, as she defeated Adrienne Fisher in the quarterfinals, 11–8, 11–4, 14–12, and then beat Kerri Wachtel, 11–7, 8–11, 11–4, 12–10, in the quarterfinals. But in the semi-finals Saunders lost to Paola Longoria, 11–7, 11–5, 11–6.

Saunders was nominated for the 2010 Manitoba Female Athlete of the Year.

Saunders was the 2nd seed in Women's Singles at the 2011 Pan American Championships in Managua, Nicaragua, but was upset by Chilean Angela Grisar, 15–10, 13–15, 11–10.

Saunders won both Women's Singles and Doubles at the 2011 Canadian Championships in Antigonish and Port Hawkesbury, Nova Scotia. In Women's Singles, Saunders defeated Frédérique Lambert, 15–11, 15–7, while in Women's Doubles she and Josée Grand'Maître won their 7th title, as they defeated the defending champions Lambert and Brandi Jacobson Prentice, 15–3, 12–15, 11–3.

Saunders was ranked 7th at the end of the 2010–11 women's professional season, which was a career high.

Saunders was on Team Canada for the 2011 Pan American Games in Guadalajara, Mexico. She played Women's Singles, and won all her group stage matches. However, in the playoffs Saunders lost her first match versus Angela Grisar in the Round of 16, 15–11, 15–7. In the quarterfinals of the Women's Team event, Saunders played both singles and doubles (with Brandi Jacobson Prentice) for Canada against Ecuador, but she lost both her matches, so Ecuador beat Canada, denying the Canadians a place on the podium.

At the 2012 Pan American Championships in Temuco, Chile, Saunders played both Women's Singles and Doubles. She lost in the quarterfinals of Women's Singles to Bolivian Carola Loma, 15–5, 12–15, 11–6. Saunders teamed with Christine Richardson in Women's Doubles, and they got to the semi-finals, but lost to Loma and Jenny Daza of Bolivia, 15–12, 15–11, so they were bronze medalists.

Saunders successfully defended her Women's Singles and Doubles titles at the 2012 Canadian Championships in Brossard, Quebec. In the Women's Singles final, Saunders defeated Frédérique Lambert, 11–15, 15–1, 11–7, while she and Josée Grand'Maître won their 8th Women's Doubles title, beating Lambert and Brandi Jacobson Prentice, 16–14, 15–10.

Saunders repeated her career high #7 ranking on the women's professional season at the end of the 2011–12.

Ten years after reaching the Women's Singles final at her first World Championships, Saunders found herself in the Women's Singles final once again. She got there by defeating Mexican Jessica Parrilla in the quarterfinals, 15–7, 15–9, then in the semi-finals Saunders got the better of Cheryl Gudinas, who had beaten her in that final a decade previously, 5–15, 15–13, 11–6. But in the final, Saunders again lost, as Mexican Paola Longoria beat her 15–11, 15–2. Nevertheless, it was Saunders's second silver medal at Worlds. In the Women's Team event, Saunders and Team Canada were bronze medalists, as they lost to Mexico in the semi-finals, but defeated Colombia in the 3rd place playoff.

Saunders qualified to go to the 2013 Pan American Championships in Cali, Colombia, but Racquetball chose not to send a team to the event because of a Canadian government travel advisory.

For a third year, Saunders won both Women's Singles and Doubles at the 2013 Canadian Championships in Langley, British Columbia. She defeated Josée Grand'Maître in the Women's Singles final, 15–6, 16–14. In Women's Doubles, Saunders and Grand'Maître defeated Brigitte Richard and Christine Richardson, 15–9, 7–15, 11–5.

In the summer of 2013, Saunders represented Canada at the World Games in Cali, Colombia, where she lost to Cristina Amaya, 15–4, 15–14, in the Round of 16.

Saunders played at the 2014 Pan American Championships in Santa Cruz, Bolivia, where she played Women's Singles, finishing in the Round of 16 after a loss to Bolivian Jenny Daza, 15–10, 15–4.

At the 2014 Canadian Championships, Saunders was the 2nd seed, as Frédérique Lambert had overtaken her in the Racquetball Canada rankings. Lambert had a good season on the Ladies Professional Racquetball Tour, which would see her finish in the top 10 for the first time in her career. And the 2014 Canadian Championships were in Brossard, Québec at Lambert's home club. Thus, it seemed a perfect set up for Lambert to win her first Canadian Women's Singles title. However, Saunders defeated Lambert in three games, 15–6, 6–15, 11–9, winning her 8th Canadian Championship in Women's Singles, which set the career record, breaking a tie she had with Heather Stupp.

Saunders and Lambert played Women's Doubles together at the 2014 World Championships in Burlington, Ontario. It was the first chance for Saunders to play an international event on home soil. However, the pair lost in the quarterfinals to the Ecuador team of Veronica Sotomayor and Maria Paz Muñoz, 15–6, 7–15, 11–8.

Saunders's accomplishments in 2014 led to another nomination for Manitoba Female Athlete of the Year.

=== 2015–2019 ===
At the 2015 Pan American Championships, Saunders played both Women's Singles and Doubles. In singles, she finished 11th, as players played down to 16, as the results would determine the seedings for the 2015 Pan American Games. She lost in the Round of 16 to Carola Loma of Bolivia, 15–9, 15–14, and then in the 9–12 playoff Saunders defeated Angela Grisar of Chile, 15–10, 15–4, but lost to Venezuelan Mariana Paredes, 4–15, 15–9, 11–7.

At the 2015 Canadian Championships, Saunders lost in Women's Singles for the first time since 2008, as Lambert won her first Canadian singles title. But in her first year playing Women's Doubles without Josée Grand'Maître, Saunders again captured the Women's Doubles title, as she and Danielle Drury defeated Frédérique Lambert and Michèle Morissette, 15–8, 2–15, 11–8.

Saunders's results got her a spot on Team Canada for the Pan Am Games in Toronto, She played Women's Singles, losing in the Round of 16 to Carola Loma of Bolivia, 15–9, 15–1. But in the Women's Team event, she and Lambert captured a bronze medal after defeating Argentina in the quarterfinals, 2–0, and losing to the US in the semi-finals, 2–0. The medal was special for Saunders. "I've been waiting for this medal for a long time," said Saunders. "It took three Pan Am Games to win one, but winning it at home is incredible."

Saunders competed for Canada at the 2016 Pan American Championships in San Luis Potosí, Mexico. She play both Women's Singles and Doubles with Frédérique Lambert. Saunders lost in the quarterfinals of singles to Bolivian Jenny Daza, 15–3, 15–8, but she and Lambert reached the podium in doubles, as they defeated Daza and Carola Loma in the quarterfinals, 15–8, 15–7, and then lost to Mexicans Paola Longoria and Samantha Salas, 15–5, 15–8, in the semi-finals, so they were awarded bronze medals.

In 2016, Saunders won her 9th Canadian Championship in Women's Singles in 2016, defeating Michèle Morissette in the final, 15–10, 17–15. But in doubles Saunders and Drury failed to defend their title, as they lost to Morissette and Christine Richardson. The win gave Saunders 20 Canadian Women's Singles and Doubles Open Division titles, which is the most for a Canadian woman or man, one more than Mike Green.

Saunders played Women's Doubles with Frédérique Lambert at the 2016 World Championships in Cali, Colombia, where they were bronze medalists. They defeated the Argentina team of Maria Jose Vargas and Pia Dati, 15–7, 15–9, in the quarterfinals, but in the semi-finals, the USA team of Aimee Ruiz and Janel Tisinger beat Saunders and Lambert, 15–8, 15–7.

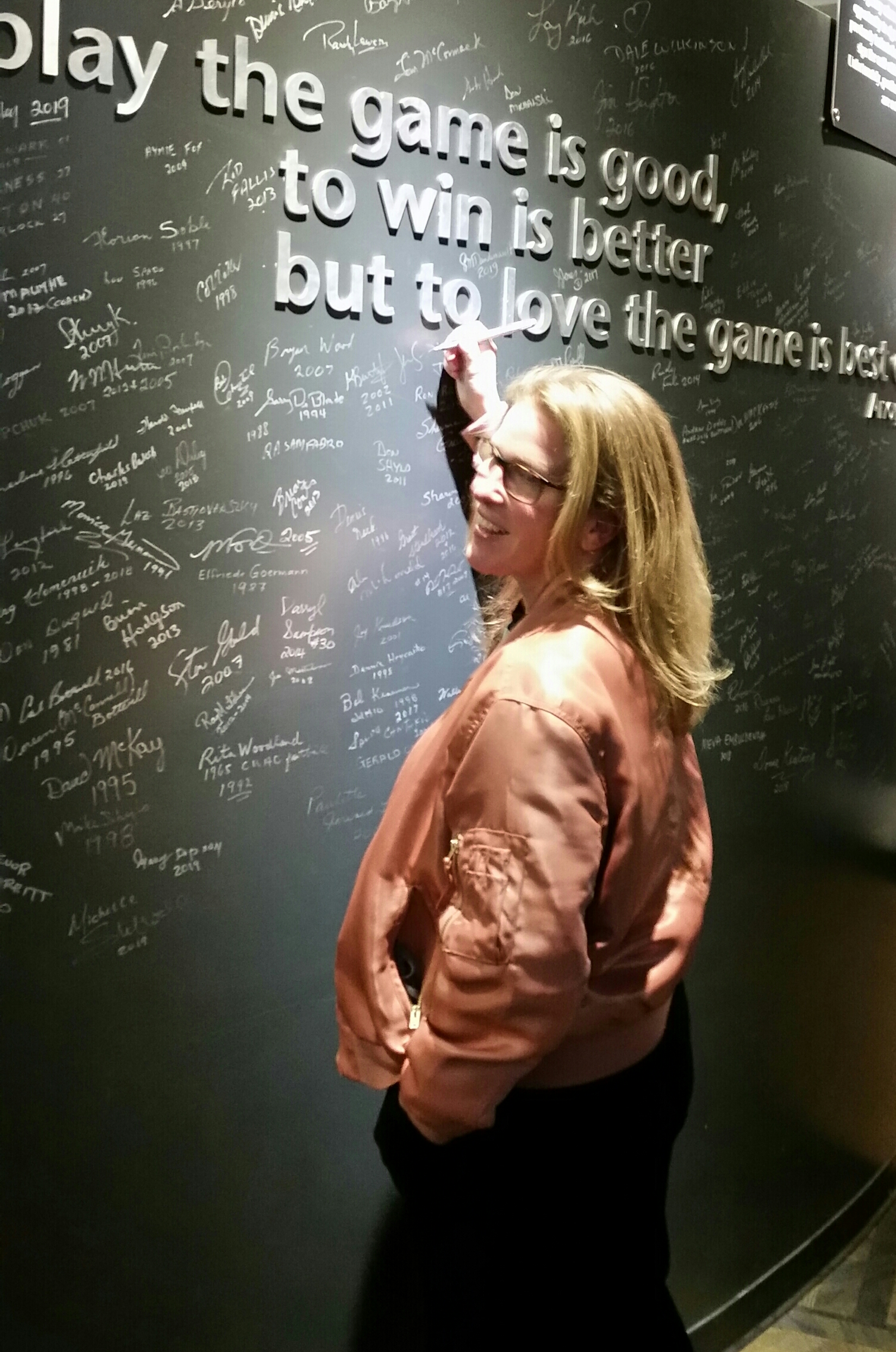
Jen Saunders signs the wall at the Manitoba Sports Hall of Fame

Saunders began the 2016–17 season well with wins at both Racquetball Canada National Team Selection Events. She defeated Michèle Morissette, 15–7, 15–8, in Valleyfield, Quebec, and Christine Richardson in Calgary, 15–8, 15–9. Those wins helped to get Saunders a spot on Team Canada for the 2017 Pan American Championships in San Jose, Costa Rica, where she played both Women's Singles and Women's Doubles with Danielle Drury. In singles, Saunders was drawn in the elimination Round of 32 against teammate Michèle Morissette, and defaulted to her. In doubles, Saunders and Drury lost in the Round of 16 to Gabriela Martinez and Andrea Martinez of Guatemala, 15–7, 15–13.

At the 2017 Canadian National Championships, Saunders lost the Women's Singles final to Frédérique Lambert, 15–7, 15–8. In Women's Doubles, Saunders played with Danielle Drury, and they finished 2nd to Michèle Morissette and Christine Richardson, losing to them 17–15, 15–13. It's the first time since 2008 that Saunders did not win either Women's Singles or Doubles at the Canadian Championships.

Saunders came 2nd in the first National Team Selection Event of the 2017–18 season in Vernon, British Columbia, where she lost to Lambert in the final, 15–6, 15–4. But she rebounded to win the second Selection Event in Kitchener, Ontario, as Saunders defeated Alexis Iwaasa, 15–7, 13–15, 11–7, in the final.

At the 2019 Pan American Racquetball Championships, Saunders played Women's Doubles with Danielle Drury, and they were bronze medalists, losing to Colombians Cristina Amaya and Adriana Riveros in the semi-finals.

At the 2019 Canadian Championships in Langley, British Columbia, Saunders won both Women's Singles, winning for the 11th time, and Women's Doubles with Danielle Drury. Those were her 11th Women's Singles title, and 13th Women's Doubles title.

Saunders's 2019 Nationals wins helped to qualify her for Team Canada at the 2019 Pan American Games in Lima, Peru. She played both singles and doubles with Frédérique Lambert in Lima. Saunders lost all three of her matches in the group stage of Women's Singles, so didn't qualify for the medal round. In Women's Doubles she and Lambert lost in the quarterfinals to Argentina's Natalia Mendez and Maria Jose Vargas, 15–9, 15–9. They also lost to Argentina in the quarterfinals of the Women's Team event.

In December 2019, Saunders retired from competition as the reigning Canadian Champion in Women's Singles and Women's Doubles. People laughed when she said she wanted to be on Team Canada, yet she spent 17 years as a member of Team Canada. "My entire career was based on proving people wrong," said Saunders.

== Career summary ==
Saunders has won 11 Canadian Women's Singles Championships, which is a record, and 13 Canadian Women's Doubles Championships, and her combined 24 titles are a record.

Internationally, Saunders has competed for Canada on 29 occasions: 8 World Championships, 4 Pan American Games, 2 World Games and 15 Pan American Championships. Across those competitions, Saunders has garnered 18 medals: 12 in Women's Singles or Doubles and 6 in Women's Team events.

Saunders's record on the women's pro tour is 64–83 with one semi-final appearance. She finished in the top 10 three times, including back to back seasons (2010–11 and 2011–12) at #7, her career high.

=== Career record ===
This table lists Saunders's results across annual events.

Event	1999	2000	2001	2002	2003	2004	2005	2006	2007	2008	2009	2010	2011	2012	2013	2014	2015	2016	2017	2018	2019
Racquetball Canada National Singles			2nd	W	2nd	2nd	W	2nd	2nd	2nd	W	W	W	W	W	W	2nd	W	2nd	W	W
Racquetball Canada National Doubles	CON	4th	5th	3rd	W	W	W	W	W	2nd	W	2nd	W	W	W	W	W	2nd	2nd	W	W
LPRT Ranking			21	13	13		43	25	22	19	9	13	7	7	13	17	34	31		35	-

Note: W = winner, F = finalist, SF = semi-finalist, QF = quarterfinalist, 16 = Round of 16, CON = consolation winner.

== See also ==
- List of racquetball players
