= 2017 European Racquetball Championships =

Tournament details
- Dates: 13–16 September
- Edition: 19
- Nations: 6
- Venue: Westvliet Fitness & Racket club
- Location: The Hague, Netherlands

- XIX Racquetball European Championships: The Netherlands 2017 -
- Men teams
Champions	(Republic of Ireland) Ireland
Runners-up	Germany
Third place	Netherlands
Fourth place	Italy
- Women teams
Champions	(Republic of Ireland) Ireland
Runners-up	Germany
Third place	Netherlands
- Men's Single
Champion	(Republic of Ireland) Johnny O Kenney
Runner-up	(Germany) Arne Schmitz
- Women's Single
Champion	(Republic of Ireland) Donny Ryder
Runner-up	(Republic of Ireland) Katie Kenny
- Men's Doubles
Champions	(Republic of Ireland) P. Ryder / O’Donogue
Runner-up	(Republic of Ireland) O'keeney / Devenney
- Women's Doubles
Champions	(Republic of Ireland) D. Ryder / Kenny
Runner-up	(Republic of Ireland) Gill / Downey

The XIX Racquetball European Championships were held in The Hague, (Netherlands) from September 13 to 16 2017, with four men's national teams and three women's national teams in competition. No senior or junior competitions were held in The Hague due to the lack of court time. This marks the first time since 1995 that the European Racquetball Championships were not held in one venue.

The venue was the Westvliet Welness & Racquet Club, near The Hague, with 1 regulation racquetball court. The 4 men's teams were Germany, Ireland, Italy and The Netherlands and the 3 women's teams were Germany, Ireland and the Netherlands. Team Belgium dropped out to several injured players only a few days before the beginning of the competition. In total, 6 nations competed in the Individual competition with players from Belgium, Germany, Ireland, Italy Poland and The Netherlands.

The opening ceremony was on September 13 with the president of European Racquetball Federation, Mike Mesecke, and the president of Nederlands Racquetball Association, Erik Timmermanns. The Closing Ceremony was held in attendance of 7-time European Singles Champion Joachim Loof (Germany), 5-time European Doubles Champion Trevor Meyer (Germany) as well as former ERF President Erik Meyer (Belgium).

== Men's national teams competition ==
=== Final round ===
September 13/14, 2017

Semi-finals
Germany	3
Netherlands	0
(Republic of Ireland) Ireland	3
Italy	0

Final
(Republic of Ireland) Ireland	2
Germany	1
Third place
Netherlands	3
Italy	0

Semifinals

Germany	3-0	Netherlands
M. Czempisz; A. Dietrich; Schmitz / Mesecke	7-15, 15–7, 11-4; 15-12, 15-11; 15-13, 15-10	P. Matla; M. van Zanten de Jong / van Zanten

Ireland	3-0	Italy
J. Devenney; J. O Kenney; Ryder / O`donoghue	15-6, 15-2; 15-13, 15-5; 11-5, 15–5, 11-10	J.D. Lattuca; Carlo Papini; Lattuca / Papini

3rd and 4th places

Netherlands	2-1	Italy
P. Matla; M. van Zanten de Jong / van Zanten	15-10, 15-3; 6-15, 5-15; 15-3, 15-10	J.D. Lattuca; Carlo Papini; Lattuca / Papini

FINAL

Ireland	2-1	Germany
J. Devenney; J. O Kenney; Ryder / O`donoghue	15-10, 8-15, 11-4; 15-14, 15-3; 12-15, 12-15	M. Czempisz; A. Dietrich; Schmitz / Mesecke

Champions
IRELAND

=== Men's teams final standings ===
Men's Team
1	(Republic of Ireland) Ireland
2	Germany
3	Netherlands
4	Italy

== Women's national teams competition ==
Women	W	L	GW	GL
(Republic of Ireland) Ireland	2	0	4	2
Netherlands	1	1	4	2
Germany	0	2	1	5

September 13, 2017
September 13, 2017	Ireland	3-0	Netherlands	The Hague (Netherlands)
September 13, 2017	D. Ryder; K. Kenny; Gill / Downey	15-11, 15-7; 15-0, 15-11; 15-8, 15-12	D. Wannee; K. Tritsmans; Wannee / Tritsmans	The Hague (Netherlands)

September 13, 2017
September 13, 2017	Netherlands	2-1	Germany	The Hague (Netherlands)
September 13, 2017	D. Wannee; K. Tritsmans; Wannee / Tritsmans	15-7, 15-9; 15-3, 15-2; 15-13, 13–15, 11-9	L. Ludwig; R. Hartmann; Ludwig / Mesecke	The Hague (Netherlands)

September 14, 2017
September 14, 2017	Ireland	3-0	Netherlands	The Hague (Netherlands)
September 14, 2017	D. Ryder; K. Kenny; Gill / Downey	15-3, 15-4; 15-1, 15-2; 15-3, 15-13	D. Wannee; K. Tritsmans; Wannee / Tritsmans	The Hague (Netherlands)

Champions
IRELAND

=== Women's teams final standings ===
Women's Team
1	(Republic of Ireland) Ireland
2	Netherlands
3	Germany

== Men's Single competition ==
First round
1	M. Czempisz (GER)	15	15
2	M. van Zanten (NED)	3	4
9	E. Schipper (NED)	15	9	4
8	D. O`donoghue (IRL)	9	15	11
5	P. Matla (NED)	15	15
12	A. Dietrich (GER)	5	2
13	E. Timmermans (NED)	7	8
4	J. O Kenney (IRL)	15	15
3	J. Devenney (IRL)	15	15
14	P. de Jong (NED)	6	1
11	C. Papini (ITA)	3	11
6	P. Ryder (IRL)	15	15
7	JD Lattuca (ITA)	9	11
10	P. Rakowski (POL)	15	15
7	N. Deboutte (BEL)	8	0
2	A. Schmitz (GER)	15	15

Quarterfinals
1	M. Czempisz	15	15
8	D. O`donoghue	11	5
5	P. Matla	12	9
4	J. O Kenney	15	15
3	J. Devenney	6	10
6	P. Ryder	15	15
7	P. Rakowski	11	10
2	A. Schmitz	15	15

Semifinals
1	M. Czempisz	12	14
4	J. O Kenney	15	15
6	P. Ryder	11	15	10
2	A. Schmitz	15	10	11

Final
1	J. O Kenney	15	15
2	A. Schmitz	8	4

Winner
Johnny O Kenney (Republic of Ireland)

== Women's Single competition ==
First round
1	D. Ryder (IRL)
9	L.Ludwig (GER)	14	6
8	A. Gill (IRL)	15	15
5	D. Wannee (NED)	5	5
12	O. Downey (IRL)	15	15
13	R. Hartmann (GER)
4	K. Kenny (IRL)	w	b	f

Semifinals
1	D. Ryder	15	15
8	A. Gill	12	6
5	O. Downey	1	8
4	K. Kenny	15	15

Final
1	D. Ryder	15	15
4	K. Kenny	6	10

Winner
DONNA RYDER (Republic of Ireland)

== Men's Doubles competition ==
First round
1	Schmitz/Czempisz (GER)	15	15
8	Rakowski/Deboutte (POL)(BEL)	8	8
9	Lattuca/Papini (ITA)	1	1
8	O'Keeney/Devenney (IRE)	15	15
5	Matla/Schipper (NED)	15	15
6	Dietrich/Mesecke (GER)	6	5
7	de Jong/van Zanten (NED)	9	7
2	Ryder/O`Donoghue (IRL)	15	15

Semifinals
1	Schmitz/Czempisz	15	14	4
8	O Keeney/Devenney	9	15	11
5	Matla/Schipper	6	6
4	Ryder/O`Donoghue	15	15

Final
O Keeney/Devenney	15	13	7
4	Ryder/O`Donoghue	3	15	11

Winners
PADRAIC RYDER / DARRAGH O`DONOGHUE (Republic of Ireland)

== Women's Doubles competition ==
Ladies Singles	W	L	GW	GL
(Republic of Ireland) Ryder/Kenny	2	0	0	6
(Republic of Ireland) Downey/Gill	1	1	2	2
(Germany) Ludwig/Mesecke	0	2	6	0

Winner
DONNA RYDER / KATIE KENNY (Republic of Ireland)

== See also ==
- European Racquetball Championships
