= 2009 European Racquetball Championships =

Tournament details
- Dates: 3–9 August
- Edition: 15
- Venue: Forrest Hill City Form
- Location: Paris, France

- XV Racquetball European Championships: France 2009 -
- Men teams
Champions	Catalonia
Runners-up	Germany
Third place	(Republic of Ireland) Ireland
Fourth place	Netherlands
- Women teams
Champions	Catalonia
Runners-up	Germany
Third place	(Republic of Ireland) Ireland
- Men's Single
Champion	(Catalonia) Víctor Montserrat
Runner-up	(Catalonia) Carlos Oviedo
- Women's Single
Champion	(Catalonia) Elisabet Consegal
Runner-up	(Germany) Yvonne Kortes
- Men's Doubles
Champions	(Republic of Ireland) Ad. Neary / J. Farrell
Runner-up	(Germany) E. Gordon / O. Bertels
- Women's Doubles
Champions	(Republic of Ireland) An. Neary / G. Byrne
Runner-up	(Republic of Ireland) K. Kenny / M. Haverty

The XV Racquetball European Championships were held in Nanterre, near Paris, (France) from August 3 to 9 2009, with seven men's national teams and three women's national teams in competition. On August 6 started the individual, doubles, senior and junior competitions.

The venue was the Forest-Hill City Form, in Nanterre, with 4 regulation racquetball courts. The 7 men's teams were Belgium, Catalonia, France, Germany, Ireland, Italy and The Netherlands and the 3 women's teams were Catalonia, Germany and Ireland. More than 50 players were in the singles, doubles, junior and senior competitions.

The opening ceremony was on August 2 with the president of European Racquetball Federation, Erik Meyer, and the president of Paris Racquetball Association, Jean-Pierre Boudart.

== Men's national teams competition ==
=== First round - August 3, 2009 ===
GROUP A	W	L	GW	GL
(Republic of Ireland) Ireland	2	0	5	1
Netherlands	1	1	4	2
Belgium	0	2	0	6

09:30
09:30	Ireland	3-0	Belgium
09:30	A. Neary; S. Keane; Farell / Dillon	15-1, 15–4; 15-8, 15–4; 15-1, 15–10	P. Devos; B. Wouters; Wouters / Deboutte

13:30
13:30	Netherlands	3-0	Belgium
13:30	P. Matla; P. de Jong; Matla / Schipper	15-3, 15–5; 14-15, 15–14, 11–5; 15-10, 15–5	P. Devos; B. Wouters; Wouters / Deboutte

18:30
18:30	Ireland	2-1	Netherlands
18:30	A. Neary; S. Keane; Farell / Dillon	15-11, 15–8; 15-6, 15–2; 13-15, 15–13, 7–11	P. Matla; P. de Jong; Matla / Schipper

GROUP B	W	L	GW	GL
Catalonia	3	0	8	1
Germany	2	1	7	2
Italy	1	2	2	7
France	0	3	1	8

09:30
09:30	Germany	3-0	Italy
09:30	E. Gordon; O. Bertels; Schmitz / Dröge	15-1, 15–2; 15-2, 15–4; 15-5, 15–2	B. Zonca; C. Accorsi; Zonca / Accorsi

09:30
09:30	Catalonia	3-0	France
09:30	V. Montserrat; C. Oviedo; Montserrat / Oviedo	15-4, 15–5; 15-4, 15–0; 15-2, 15–0	P. Lecomte; D. Roques; Teinturier / Mufraggi

13:30
13:30	Germany	3-0	France
13:30	E. Gordon; O. Bertels; Schmitz / Dröge	15-4, 15–6; 15-2, 15–1; 15-2, 15–5	P. Lecomte; D. Roques; Teinturier / Mufraggi

13:30
13:30	Catalonia	3-0	Italy
13:30	V. Montserrat; C. Oviedo; Montserrat / Oviedo	15-0, 15–1; 15-2, 15–1; 15-2, 15–2	B. Zonca; C. Accorsi; Zonca / Accorsi

18:30
18:30	Catalonia	2-1	Germany
18:30	V. Montserrat; C. Oviedo; Montserrat / Oviedo	12-15, 15–7, 11–10; 15-5, 15–2; Germ.wins by ff	E. Gordon; O. Bertels; Schmitz / Dröge

18:30
18:30	France	1-2	Italy
18:30	P. Lecomte; D. Roques; Teinturier / Mufraggi	15-1, 15–4; 4-15, 7–15; 11-15, 6–15	B. Zonca; C. Accorsi; Zonca / Accorsi

=== Final round ===
August 4, 2009

Semi-finals
(Republic of Ireland) Ireland	0
Germany	3
Netherlands	1
Catalonia	2

Final
Germany	1
(Catalonia) CATALONIA	2
Third place
(Republic of Ireland) Ireland	2
Netherlands	1

Semifinals - 09:30

Ireland	0-3	Germany
A. Neary; S. Keane; Farell / Dillon	6-15, 13–15; 3-15, 13–15; 15-7, 12–15, 6–11	E. Gordon; O. Bertels; Schmitz / Dröge

Catalonia	2-1	Netherlands
V. Montserrat; C. Oviedo; Montserrat / Oviedo	15-8, 15–9; 15-6, 15–1; NED wins by FF	P. Matla; P. de Jong; Matla / Schipper

5th to 7th places - 09:30

Belgium	2-1	France
P. Devos; B. Wouters; Wouters / Deboutte	13-15, 6–15; 15-6, 15–3; 15-5, 15–4	P. Lecomte; D. Roques; Teinturier / Mufraggi

5th and 6th places - 13:30

Belgium	2-1	Italy
P. Devos; B. Wouters; Wouters / Deboutte	15-7, 15–4; 1-15, 7–15; 15-12, 11–15, 11–2	B. Zonca; C. Accorsi; Zonca / Accorsi

3rd and 4th places - 13:30

Ireland	2-1	Netherlands
P. Matla; P. de Jong; Matla / Schipper	15-9, 6–15, 7–11; 15-1, 15–6; 15-5, 15–5	A. Neary; S. Keane; Farell / Dillon

FINAL - 18:00

Catalonia	2-1	Germany
V. Montserrat; C. Oviedo; Montserrat / Oviedo	15-11, 15–12; 4-15, 15–11, 7–11; 15-0, 15–0	E. Gordon; O. Bertels; Schmitz / Dröge

Champions
CATALONIA

=== Men's teams final standings ===
Men's Team
1	Catalonia
2	Germany
3	(Republic of Ireland) Ireland
4	Netherlands
5	Belgium
6	Italy
7	France

== Women's national teams competition ==
Women	W	L	GW	GL
Catalonia	2	0	4	2
Germany	1	1	4	2
(Republic of Ireland) Ireland	0	2	1	5

August 3, 2009; 13:30
August 3, 2009; 13:30	Ireland	1-2	Catalonia	Nanterre (France)
August 3, 2009; 13:30	T. Neary; M. Haverty; Neary / Byrne	6-15, 5–15; 15-11, 13–15, 10–11; 15-5, 11–15, 11–7	E. Consegal; R. Consegal; Consegal / Consegal	Nanterre (France)

August 4, 2009; 10:30
August 4, 2009; 10:30	Germany	1-2	Catalonia	Nanterre (France)
August 4, 2009; 10:30	A. Gordon; Y. Kortes; Kortes / Ludwig	8-15, 6–15; 15-6, 15–5; 11-15, 13–15	E. Consegal; R. Consegal; Consegal / Consegal	Nanterre (France)

August 4, 2009; 15:00
August 4, 2009; 15:00	Ireland	0-3	Germany	Nanterre (France)
August 4, 2009; 15:00	T. Neary; M. Haverty; Neary / Byrne	13-15, 10–15; 6-15, 6–15; GER wins by FF	A. Gordon; Y. Kortes; Kortes / Ludwig	Nanterre (France)

Champions
CATALONIA

=== Women's teams final standings ===
Women's Team
1	Catalonia
2	Germany
3	(Republic of Ireland) Ireland

== Men's Single competition ==
First round
1	V. Montserrat (CAT)
17	J. Grandjon (FRA)	0	15	11
16	B. Zonca (ITA)	15	6	7
9	S. Keane (IRL)
8	A. Schmitz (GER)
5	J. Farrell (IRL)
21	S. Macaluso (GER)	6	2
12	C. Accorsi (ITA)	15	15
13	F. Kaid (FRA)	15	15
20	B. Teinturier (FRA)	11	12
4	O. Bertels (GER)
3	A. Neary (IRL)
19	D. Roques (FRA)	15	9	1
14	T. Zuber (GER)	9	15	11
11	P. de Jong (NED)	7	15	11
22	G. Chidlovetzki (FRA)	15	4	3
6	C. Oviedo (CAT)
7	J. Dillon (IRL)
10	P. Lecomte (FRA)
15	F. Raposo (ESP)	12	8
18	N. Mufraggi (FRA)	15	15
2	E. Gordon (GER)

Second round
1	V. Montserrat	15	15
17	J. Grandjon	6	1
9	S. Keane	15	5	11
8	A. Schmitz	13	15	2
5	J. Farrell	15	15
12	C. Accorsi	6	2
13	F. Kaid	5	1
4	O. Bertels	15	15
3	A. Neary	15	15
14	T. Zuber	4	0
11	P. de Jong	2	5
6	C. Oviedo	15	15
7	J. Dillon	9	12
10	P. Lecomte	15	15
18	N. Mufraggi	2	1
2	E. Gordon	15	15

Quarterfinals
1	V. Montserrat	15	15
9	S. Keane	12	4
5	J. Farrell	15	11	6
4	O. Bertels	15	11
3	A. Neary	9	8
6	C. Oviedo	15	15
10	P. Lecomte
2	E. Gordon	w	b	f

Semifinals
1	V. Montserrat	4	15	11
4	O. Bertels	15	5	4
6	C. Oviedo	3	15	11
2	E. Gordon	15	7	7

Final
1	V. Montserrat	15	15
6	C. Oviedo	13	13

Winner
VÍCTOR MONTSERRAT (Catalonia)

== Women's Single competition ==
First round
1	E. Consegal (CAT)
9	K. Kenny (IRL)	8	15	11
8	L. Ludwig (GER)	15	8	0
5	G. Byrne (IRL)	15	13	11
12	K. Tritsmans (BEL)	10	15	3
13	S. Kunnos (SWE)	2	4
4	A. Gordon (GER)	15	15
3	A. Neary (IRL)	15	15
14	A. Kececi (TUR)	4	2
11	R. Byrne (IRL)	12	15	7
6	M. Haverty (IRL)	15	5	11
7	R. Consegal (CAT)	15	15
10	O. Byrne (IRL)	6	5
2	Y. Kortes (GER)

Quarterfinals
1	E. Consegal	15	15
8	K. Kenny	3	4
5	G. Byrne	13	4
4	A. Gordon	15	15
3	A. Neary	12	15	7
6	M. Haverty	15	5	11
7	R. Consegal	3	3
2	Y. Kortes	15	15

Semifinals
1	E. Consegal	15	4	11
4	A. Gordon	11	15	10
6	M. Haverty	13	7
2	Y. Kortes	15	15

Final
1	E. Consegal	3	15	11
2	Y. Kortes	15	8	7

Winner
ELISABET CONSEGAL (Catalonia)

== Men's Doubles competition ==
First round
1	Neary/Farrell (IRL)
9	Roques/Mufraggi (FRA)	11	10
8	Macaluso/Zuber (GER)	15	15
5	Wouters/Deboutte (BEL)
4	Schmitz/Dröge (GER)
3	Dillon/Keane (IRL)
6	Matla/De Jong (NED)
7	Accorsi/Zonca (ITA)
2	Gordon/Bertels (GER)

Quarterfinals
1	Neary/Farrell	15	15
8	Macaluso/Zuber	1	1
5	Wouters/Deboutte	6	0
4	Schmitz/Dröge	15	15
3	Dillon/Keane	15	15
6	Matla/De Jong	5	6
7	Accorsi/Zonca	5	1
2	Gordon/Bertels	15	15

Semifinals
1	Neary/Farrell	15	15
4	Schmitz/Dröge	8	8
3	Dillon/Keane	7	13
2	Gordon/Bertels	15	15

Final
1	Neary/Farrell	w	b	f
2	Gordon/Bertels	i	n	j

Winners
ADAM NEARY / JOE FARRELL (Republic of Ireland)

== Women's Doubles competition ==
Quarterfinals
1	Kenny/Haverty (IRL)
5	Byrne/Byrne (IRL)	8	15	10
4	Wannee/Tritsmans (NED)(BEL)	15	12	11
3	Kortes/Gordon (GER)
6
2
2	Neary/Byrne (IRL)

Semifinals
1	Kenny/Haverty	w	b	f
4	Wannee/Tritsmans
3	Kortes/Gordon	14	15	5
2	Neary/Byrne	15	12	11

Final
1	Kenny/Haverty	6	15	6
2	Neary/Byrne	15	13	11

Winners
ANTONIA NEARY / GERALDINE BYRNE (Republic of Ireland)

== See also ==
- European Racquetball Championships
