= 2007 European Racquetball Championships =

Tournament details
- Dates: July 28 to 4 August
- Edition: 14
- Nations: 7
- Venue: Centro Sportivo di Brembate
- Location: Brembate, Italy

- XIV European Racquetball Championship: Italy 2007 -
- Men Teams
Champion; Runner-up; Third; Fourth	(Republic of Ireland) Ireland; Germany; Catalonia; Netherlands
- Women teams
Champion; Runner-up; Third; Fourth	(Republic of Ireland) Ireland; Germany; France; Catalonia
- Men Individual
Champion; Runner-up	(Catalonia) Víctor Montserrat (Republic of Ireland) Noel O'Callaghan
- Women individual
Champion; Runner-up	(France) Marie-Josee Collet (Republic of Ireland) Susan Farrell

The XIV Racquetball European Championship was held in Brembate (Italy) from July 28 to August 4, 2007, with six men's national teams and four women's national teams in competition. On August 1 started the individual competition.

The venue was the Centro Sportivo Comunale di Brembate, in Brembate (Bergamo), with 2 regulation racquetball courts. The 6 men's teams were Belgium, Catalonia, Germany, Ireland, Italy and The Netherlands and the 3 women's teams were Catalonia, Germany and Ireland. More than 50 players were in the singles, doubles, junior and senior competitions.

The opening ceremony was on July 28 with the Vice President of European Racquetball Federation, Mike Mesecke, and the President of Racquetball Italia, Marco Arnoldi, in attendance.

== Men's national teams competition ==
=== First round ===
POOL A	W	L	GW	GL
(Republic of Ireland) Ireland	2	0	6	0
Catalonia	1	1	3	3
Belgium	0	2	0	6

July 29, 2007; 10:00
July 29, 2007; 10:00	Ireland	3-0	Belgium	Centro Sportivo Communale; Brembate
July 29, 2007; 10:00	Hickey; Neary; O Callaghan / Gannon	(2-0) (2-0) (2-0)	Devos; Deboutte; Deboutte / Wouters	Centro Sportivo Communale; Brembate

July 29, 2007; 16:00
July 29, 2007; 16:00	Catalonia	3-0	Belgium	Centro Sportivo Communale; Brembate
July 29, 2007; 16:00	Montserrat; Flores; Pérez / Montserrat	(2-0) (2-0) (2-0)	Devos; Deboutte; Deboutte / Wouters	Centro Sportivo Communale; Brembate

July 30, 2007; 10:00
July 30, 2007; 10:00	Ireland	3-0	Catalonia	Centro Sportivo Communale; Brembate
July 30, 2007; 10:00	Hickey; Neary; O Callaghan / Gannon	(2-1) (2-0) (2-0)	Montserrat; Flores; Pérez / Montserrat	Centro Sportivo Communale; Brembate

POOL B	W	L	GW	GL
Germany	2	0	5	1
Netherlands	1	1	4	2
Italy	0	2	0	6

July 29, 2007; 10:00
July 29, 2007; 10:00	Germany	3-0	Italy	Centro Sportivo Communale; Brembate
July 29, 2007; 10:00	Czempisz; Bertels; Bertels / Schmitz	(2-0) (2-0) (2-0)	Zonca	Centro Sportivo Communale; Brembate

July 29, 2007; 16:00
July 29, 2007; 16:00	Netherlands	3-0	Italy	Centro Sportivo Communale; Brembate
July 29, 2007; 16:00	Van der Holst; Veeken, De Jong / Timmermans	(2-0) (2-0) (2-0)	Zonca	Centro Sportivo Communale; Brembate

July 30, 2007; 10:00
July 30, 2007; 10:00	Germany	2-1	Netherlands	Centro Sportivo Communale; Brembate
July 30, 2007; 10:00	Czempisz; Bertels; Bertels / Schmitz	(1-2) (2-0) (2-0)	Van der Holst; Veeken, De Jong / Timmermans	Centro Sportivo Communale; Brembate

=== Final round ===
Semi-finals
July 30 - Brembate (16:00)
(Republic of Ireland) Ireland	2
Netherlands	1
July 30 - Brembate (16:00)
Germany	2
Catalonia	1

Final
July 31 - Brembate (16:00)
(Republic of Ireland) IRELAND	2
Germany	1
Third place
July 31 - Brembate (10:00)
Netherlands	1
Catalonia	2

Semifinals

July 30, 2007; 10:00
July 30, 2007; 10:00	Ireland	2-1	Netherlands	Centro Sportivo Communale; Brembate
July 30, 2007; 10:00	Hickey; Neary; O Callaghan / Gannon	(0-2) (2-0) (2-0)	Van der Holst; Veeken, De Jong / Timmermans	Centro Sportivo Communale; Brembate

July 30, 2007; 16:00
July 30, 2007; 16:00	Germany	2-1	Catalonia	Centro Sportivo Communale; Brembate
July 30, 2007; 16:00	Czempisz; Bertels; Bertels / Schmitz	(0-2) (2-0) (2-1)	Montserrat; Sàlvia; Pérez / Montserrat	Centro Sportivo Communale; Brembate

5th and 6th places

July 31, 2007; 10:00
July 31, 2007; 10:00	Belgium	3-0	Italy	Centro Sportivo Communale; Brembate
July 31, 2007; 10:00	Devos; Deboutte; Deboutte/Wouters	(2-0) (2-0) (2-0)	Zonca; Brezzolari; Arnoldi/Brezzolari	Centro Sportivo Communale; Brembate

3rd and 4th places

July 31, 2007; 10:00
July 31, 2007; 10:00	Catalonia	2-1	Netherlands	Centro Sportivo Communale; Brembate
July 31, 2007; 10:00	Montserrat; Sàlvia; Pérez / Montserrat	(1-2) (2-0) (2-0)	Van der Holst; Veeken, De Jong / Timmermans	Centro Sportivo Communale; Brembate

FINAL

July 31, 2007; 16:00
July 31, 2007; 16:00	Ireland	2-1	Germany	Centro Sportivo Communale; Brembate
July 31, 2007; 16:00	Hickey; Neary; O Callaghan / Gannon	(2-0) (1-2) (2-0)	Czempisz; Bertels; Bertels / Schmitz	Centro Sportivo Communale; Brembate

Champions
IRELAND

=== Men's teams final standings ===
Men's Team
1	(Republic of Ireland) Ireland
2	Germany
3	Catalonia
4	Netherlands
5	Belgium
6	Italy

== Women's national teams competition ==
Women	W	L	GW	GL
(Republic of Ireland) Ireland	3	0	7	2
Germany	2	1	5	4
France	1	2	4	5
Catalonia	0	3	2	7

July 29, 2007; 13:00
July 29, 2007; 13:00	Germany	2-1	Catalonia	Centro Sportivo Communale; Brembate
July 29, 2007; 13:00	Kortes; Ludwig; Kortes / Ludwig	(2-0) (0-2) (2-0)	Ventura; Cardellach; Ventura / Cardellach	Centro Sportivo Communale; Brembate

July 29, 2007; 13:00
July 29, 2007; 13:00	Ireland	2-1	France	Centro Sportivo Communale; Brembate
July 29, 2007; 13:00	E. Skehan; O'Callaghan; J. Skehan / Shanahan	(0-2) (2-0) (2-0)	Collet; Raphanel; Collet / Raphanel	Centro Sportivo Communale; Brembate

July 30, 2007; 13:00
July 30, 2007; 13:00	Germany	2-1	France	Centro Sportivo Communale; Brembate
July 30, 2007; 13:00	Kortes; Ludwig; Kortes / Ludwig	(2-1) (0-2) (2-0)	Collet; Raphanel; Collet / Raphanel	Centro Sportivo Communale; Brembate

July 30, 2007; 13:00
July 30, 2007; 13:00	Ireland	3-0	Catalonia	Centro Sportivo Communale; Brembate
July 30, 2007; 13:00	E. Skehan; O'Callaghan; J. Skehan / Shanahan	(2-0) (2-0) (2-1)	Ventura; Cardellach; Ventura / Cardellach	Centro Sportivo Communale; Brembate

July 31, 2007; 13:00
July 31, 2007; 13:00	Germany	1-2	Ireland	Centro Sportivo Communale; Brembate
July 31, 2007; 13:00	Kortes; Ludwig; Kortes / Ludwig	(2-0) (0-2) (2-1)	E. Skehan; O'Callaghan; J. Skehan / Shanahan	Centro Sportivo Communale; Brembate

July 31, 2007; 13:00
July 31, 2007; 13:00	France	2-1	Catalonia	Centro Sportivo Communale; Brembate
July 31, 2007; 13:00	Collet; Raphanel; Collet / Raphanel	(2-0) (1-2) (2-0)	Ventura; Cardellach; Ventura / Cardellach	Centro Sportivo Communale; Brembate

Champions
IRELAND

=== Women's teams final standings ===
Women's Team
1	(Republic of Ireland) Ireland
2	Germany
3	France
4	Catalonia

== Individual men's competition ==
First round
1	M. Van Der Holst
17	Ignasi Perez	1
16	Peter De Jong	2
9	Marcel Czempisz	2
24	Stefano Ghezzi	0
25	Davide Panseri	0
8	Adam Neary	2
5	Pascal Matla	2
28	Benedetto Zonca	0
21	Benito Brezzolari	0
12	Patrick Hanley	2
13	Stephen O'loan	2
20	Oscar Rosa	0
29	Erik Timmermans	0
4	Víctor Montserrat	2
3	Noel O'callaghan	2
30	Michel Veeken	0
19	Jonathan O'keeney	0
14	Arne Schmitz	2
11	Joe Farrell	2
22	Luca Brezzolari	0
27	Ruaidhri O'rourke	0
6	R. Van Doezum	2
7	Oliver Bertels	2
26	Marco Romagnani	0
23	Mirco Doneda	0
10	Jimmy Gannon	2
15	Oriol Sàlvia	2
18	Sean Keane	0
31	Orhan Surek
2	Tristan Hickey	WBF

Second round
1	M. Van Der Holst	2
16	Peter De Jong	0
9	Marcel Czempisz	1
8	Adam Neary	2
5	Pascal Matla	2
12	Patrick Hanley	0
13	Stephen O'loan	0
4	Víctor Montserrat	2
3	Noel O'callaghan	2
14	Arne Schmitz	0
11	Joe Farrell	2
6	R. Van Doezum	1
7	Oliver Bertels	2
10	Jimmy Gannon	0
15	Oriol Sàlvia
2	Tristan Hickey	WBF

Quarterfinals
1	M. Van Der Holst	1
8	Adam Neary	2
5	Pascal Matla	0
4	Víctor Montserrat	2
3	Noel O'callaghan	2
11	Joe Farrell	1
7	Oliver Bertels
2	Tristan Hickey	WBF

Semifinals
8	Adam Neary	1
4	Víctor Montserrat	2
3	Noel O'callaghan	2
2	Tristan Hickey	0

Final
4	Víctor Montserrat	2
3	Noel O'callaghan	1

Winner
VÍCTOR MONTSERRAT (Catalonia)

== Individual women's competition ==
First round
1	Marie-josee Collet
9	Núria Cardellach	0
8	Eithne Skehan	2
5	B. O'callaghan	2
12	Ayten Kececi	0
13	Consuelo Del Prato	0
4	Elma Gibney	2
3	Yvonne Kortes	2
14	Majella Haverty	0
11	Nathalie Raphanel	0
6	Julie Skehan	2
7	Helen Shanahan	2
10	Anna Ventura	1
2	Susan Farrell

Quarterfinals
1	Marie-josee Collet	2
8	Eithne Skehan	0
5	B. O'callaghan	0
4	Elma Gibney	2
3	Yvonne Kortes	0
6	Julie Skehan	2
7	Helen Shanahan	0
2	Susan Farrell	2

Semifinals
1	Marie-josee Collet	2
4	Elma Gibney	0
6	Julie Skehan	0
2	Susan Farrell	2

Final
1	Marie-josee Collet	2
2	Susan Farrell	0

Winner
MARIE-JOSEE COLLET (France)

== See also ==
- European Racquetball Championships
