= European Racquetball Championships =

International sporting competition

The European Racquetball Championships are organized every two years by the European Racquetball Federation (ERF), since 1981, to determine the strongest national racquetball teams and individual male and female players in Europe.

European Racquetball Singles Championships
	Year	Host	Men's Singles	Ladies Singles
I	1981	Netherlands	(Netherlands) Tony Luykx	(Netherlands) Dineke Kool
II	1983	Germany	(Netherlands) Tony Luykx	(Netherlands) Dineke Kool
III	1985	Belgium	(Netherlands) Arno Mooymann	(Netherlands) Mirjam Wielheesen
IV	1987	Netherlands	(Netherlands) Ronald de Zwijger	(Netherlands) Dineke Kool
V	1989	France	(Netherlands) Arno Mooymann	(Republic of Ireland) Marie Duignan
VI	1991	Belgium	(Germany) Joachim Loof	(Republic of Ireland) Bobby Brennan
VII	1993	Germany	(Germany) Joachim Loof	(Germany) Andrea Gordon
VIII	1995	Ireland	(United Kingdom) Andrew Kane	(Republic of Ireland) Kathleen Curran
IX	1997	Germany	(Germany) Joachim Loof	(Belgium) Brigitte Swolfs
X	1999	Germany	(Germany) Joachim Loof	(Netherlands) Daphne Wannee
XI	2001	Ireland	(Germany) Joachim Loof	(Netherlands) Daphne Wannee
XII	2003	Netherlands	(Germany) Joachim Loof	(Republic of Ireland) Joan Kennedy
XIII	2005	Germany	(Germany) Joachim Loof	(France) Marie-Josée Collet
XIV	2007	Italy	(Catalonia) Victor Montserrat	(France) Marie-Josée Collet
XV	2009	France	(Catalonia) Victor Montserrat	(Catalonia) Elisabeth Consegal
XVI	2011	Germany	(Germany) Eric Gordon	(Germany) Andrea Gordon
XVII	2013	Italy	(Republic of Ireland) Noel O'Callaghan	(Republic of Ireland) Aisling Hickey
XVIII	2015	Germany	(Germany) Oliver Bertels	(Germany) Andrea Gordon
XIX	2017	Netherlands	(Republic of Ireland) Johnny O Kenney	(Republic of Ireland) Donna Ryder
XX	2019	Germany	(Germany) Marcel Czempisz	(Republic of Ireland) Majella Haverty

European Racquetball Doubles Championships
	Year	Host	Men's Doubles	Ladies Doubles
I	1981	Netherlands	-	-
II	1983	Germany	-	(Republic of Ireland) Jennings/Cullinane
III	1985	Belgium	-	-
IV	1987	Netherlands	(Netherlands) Mooymann/v. Doezum	(Netherlands) Kool/Corsius
V	1989	France	(Germany) Loof/Hayter	(Republic of Ireland) Ryan/Curran
VI	1991	Belgium	(Republic of Ireland) Ganonn/O'Gallaghan	(Republic of Ireland) Brennan/Curran
VII	1993	Germany	(Germany) Loof/Hayter	(Republic of Ireland) Effernan/O'Farrell
VIII	1995	Ireland	(United Kingdom) Kane/Shaw	(United Kingdom) Hackett/Gourley
IX	1997	Germany	(Germany) Loof/Hayter	-
X	1999	Germany	(Germany) Loof/Hayter	-
XI	2001	Ireland	(Germany) Loof/Hayter	(Netherlands) Wannee/Tritsmans
XII	2003	Netherlands	(Netherlands) Matla/Schipper	(Republic of Ireland) Neary/Gibney
XIII	2005	Germany	(Germany) Bertels/Klippel	(Republic of Ireland) Gibney/Coffey
XIV	2007	Italy	(Republic of Ireland) Neary/Hickey	(Republic of Ireland) Farrel/Neary
XV	2009	France	(Republic of Ireland) Farrell/Neary	(Republic of Ireland) Neary/Byrne
XVI	2011	Germany	(Germany) Loof/Meyer	(Republic of Ireland) Haverty/Kenny
XVII	2013	Italy	(Republic of Ireland) Murphy/Quinn	(Republic of Ireland) Hickey/Ryan
XVIII	2015	Germany	(Germany) Bertels/Schmitz	(Germany) Ludwig/Gordon
XIX	2017	Netherlands	(Republic of Ireland) Ryder P./O’Donogue	(Republic of Ireland) Ryder D./Kenny
XX	2019	Germany	(Germany) Loof/Czempisz	(Republic of Ireland) Haverty/Kenny

European Racquetball Team Championships
	Year	Host	Men's Team	Women's Team	Overall/Combined
I	1981	Netherlands	-	-	Netherlands
II	1983	Germany	(Republic of Ireland) Ireland	(Republic of Ireland) Ireland	(Republic of Ireland) Ireland
III	1985	Belgium	(Republic of Ireland) Ireland	(Republic of Ireland) Ireland	(Republic of Ireland) Ireland
IV	1987	Netherlands	Netherlands	Netherlands	Netherlands
V	1989	France	Netherlands	(Republic of Ireland) Ireland	Netherlands
VI	1991	Belgium	Germany	(Republic of Ireland) Ireland	(Republic of Ireland) Ireland
VII	1993	Germany	Germany	(Republic of Ireland) Ireland	Germany
VIII	1995	Ireland	(United Kingdom) Great Britain	(Republic of Ireland) Ireland	(Republic of Ireland) Ireland
IX	1997	Germany	Germany	-	Germany
X	1999	Germany	Germany	-	Germany
XI	2001	Ireland	(Republic of Ireland) Ireland	-	(Republic of Ireland) Ireland
XII	2003	Netherlands	(Republic of Ireland) Ireland	(Republic of Ireland) Ireland	(Republic of Ireland) Ireland
XIII	2005	Germany	Germany	(Republic of Ireland) Ireland	Germany
XIV	2007	Italy	(Republic of Ireland) Ireland	(Republic of Ireland) Ireland	(Republic of Ireland) Ireland
XV	2009	France	Catalonia	Catalonia	Catalonia
XVI	2011	Germany	Germany	Germany	Germany
XVII	2013	Italy	(Republic of Ireland) Ireland	(Republic of Ireland) Ireland	(Republic of Ireland) Ireland
XVIII	2015	Germany	Germany	Germany	Germany
XIX	2017	Netherlands	(Republic of Ireland) Ireland	(Republic of Ireland) Ireland	(Republic of Ireland) Ireland
XX	2019	Germany	(Republic of Ireland) Ireland	(Republic of Ireland) Ireland	(Republic of Ireland) Ireland
