= 2019 European Racquetball Championships =

Tournament details
- Dates: 05–07 September
- Edition: 20
- Nations: 6
- Venue: Sport & Spa Jenfeld
- Location: Hamburg, Germany

- XX Racquetball European Championships: Germany 2019 -
- Men teams
Champions	(Republic of Ireland) Ireland
Runners-up	Germany
Third place	Italy
Fourth place	Netherlands
- Women teams
Champions	(Republic of Ireland) Ireland
Runners-up	Germany
- Men's Single
Champion	(Germany) Marcel Czempisz
Runner-up	(Republic of Ireland) Mark Murphy
- Women's Single
Champion	(Republic of Ireland) Majella Haverty
Runner-up	(Republic of Ireland) Antonia Neary
- Men's Doubles
Champions	(Germany) Czempisz / Loof
Runner-up	(Republic of Ireland) O'keeney / Murphy
- Women's Doubles
Champions	(Republic of Ireland) Haverty / Kenny
Runner-up	(Republic of Ireland) Neary / Downey

The XX Racquetball European Championships were held in Hamburg, Germany from September 5 to 07 2019, with four men's national teams and two women's national teams in competition. One senior and junior competition could be held as well.

The venue was the Sport & Spa Jenfeld Club in Hamburg, with 2 regulation racquetball courts. The 4 men's teams were Germany, Ireland, Italy and The Netherlands and the 3 women's teams were Germany, Ireland and the Netherlands. Team France dropped out to an injured player only a few days before the beginning of the competition. In total, 6 nations competed in the Individual competition with players from Germany, Ireland, Italy, Lithuania, Poland and The Netherlands.

== Men's national teams competition ==
=== September 5th, 2019 ===
GROUP	W	L	GW	GL
Germany	2	1	6	3
(Republic of Ireland) Ireland	3	1	9	0
Italy	1	2	2	7
Netherlands	0	3	1	8

Ireland	3-0	Italy
M. Murphy; K. Cottrell; J. O‘Keeney / E. Tynan	15-8, 15-8; 15-1, 15-5; 15-5, 2-0 wbf	F. Alongi; C. Papini; F. Alongi / C. Papini

Germany	3-0	Netherlands
M. Czempisz; M. Klippel; A. Schmitz / O. Bertels	15-4, 15-5; 15-6, 15-10; 15-7, 15-6	M. van Zanten; E. Schipper; M. van Zanten / P. de Jong

Ireland	3-0	Netherlands
M. Murphy; K. Cottrell; J. O‘Keeney / E. Tynan	15-1, 15-6; 15-4, 15-4; 15-4, 15-7	M. van Zanten; E. Schipper; M. van Zanten / P. de Jong

Germany	3-0	Italy
M. Czempisz; M. Klippel; A. Schmitz / O. Bertels	15-2, 15-4; 15-4, 15-7; 15-5, 15-3	F. Alongi; C. Papini; F. Alongi / C. Papini

Netherlands	1-2	Italy
M. van Zanten; E. Schipper; M. van Zanten / P. de Jong	13-15, 9-15; 9-15, 6-15; 15-12, 9–15, 11-7	F. Alongi; C. Papini; F. Alongi / C. Papini

Ireland	3-0	Germany
M. Murphy; K. Cottrell; J. O‘Keeney / E. Tynan	4-15, 15–5, 11-10; 15-5, 15-8; 15-5, 15-8	M. Czempisz; M. Klippel; A. Schmitz / O. Bertels

Champions
IRELAND

=== Men's teams final standings ===
Men's Team
1	(Republic of Ireland) Ireland
2	Germany
3	Italy

== Women's national teams competition ==
Women	W	L	GW	GL
(Republic of Ireland) Ireland	1	0	3	0
Germany	0	1	0	3

Ireland	3-0	Germany
M. Haverty; O. Downey; Neary / Kenny /	15-2, 15-0; 15-6, 15–1, 15-3; 15-0, 15-0	Y. Mesecke; R. Hartmann; Mesecke / Hartmann

Champions
Ireland

=== Women's teams final standings ===
Women's Team
1	(Republic of Ireland) Ireland
2	Germany

== Men's Single competition ==
First round
1	M. Czempisz (GER)
2
9	E. Tynan (IRL)	15	15
8	M. Scheffler (GER)	4	5
5	E. Schipper (NED)	15	0
12	P. Rakowski (POL)	11	4
13	C. Papini (ITA)	5	7
4	A. Schmitz (GER)	15	15
3	M. Czempicz (GER)
14	bye
11	F. Alongi (ITA)	8	3
6	M. van Zanten (NED)	15	15
7	J. Loof (GER)	4	15	0
10	K. Cottrell (IRL)	15	13	11
7
2	J. O‘Keeney (IRL)

Quarterfinals
1	M. Murphy	15	15
9	E. Tynan	5	6
5	E. Schipper	10	8
4	A. Schmitz	15	15
3	M. Czempisz	15	15
6	M. van Zanten	11	7
10	K. Cottrell	3	5
2	J. O‘Keeney	15	15

Semifinals
1	M. Murphy	15	15
4	A. Schmitz	3	8
3	M. Czempisz	15	15
2	J.O‘Keeney	4	2

Final
1	M. Murphy	1	15	6
3	M. Czempisz	15	14	11

Winner
Marcel Czempisz (Germany)

== Women's Single competition ==
First round
1	M. Haverty (IRL)
9	R. Hartmann (GER)	3	3
8	O. Downey (IRL)	15	15
5	A. Neary (IRL)	15	15
12	V. Rakowski (LIT)	1	1
13	J.T. Suechting (GER)
4	K. Kenny (IRL)	w	b	f

Semifinals
1	M. Haverty	15	15
8	O. Downey	14	4
3	A. Neary	8	15	11
2	K. Kenny	15	14

Final
10	M. Haverty	15	15
3	A. Neary	3	5

Winner
Majella Haverty (Republic of Ireland)

== Men's Doubles competition ==
First round
1	O‘Keeney/Murphy (IRL)
8	bye
5	Alongi/Papini (ITA)	11	4
4	Scheffler/Schmitz (GER)	15	15
3	van Zanten/Schipper (NED)	14	6
6	Ludwig/Mesecke (GER)	15	15
7	Suechting/Suechting (GER)	9	8
2	Loof/Czempisz (GER)	15	15

Semifinals
1	O’Keeney/Murphy	15	15
4	Scheffler/Schmitz	5	0
6	Ludwig/Mesecke	6	13
2	Loof/Czempisz	15	15

Final
O Keeney/Murphy	13	13
2	Loof/Czempisz	15	15

Winners
Joachim Loof / Marcel Czempisz (Germany)

== Women's Doubles competition ==
FINAL
1	Haverty/Kenny (IRL)	15	15
2	Neary/Downey (IRL)	7	4

Winner
Majella Haverty / Katie Kenny (Republic of Ireland)

== See also ==
- European Racquetball Championships
