= 2011 European Racquetball Championships =

Tournament details
- Dates: 1–7 August
- Edition: 16
- Nations: 5
- Venue: Racquetball-Club Bad Tölz e.V.
- Location: Bad Tölz, Germany

- XIV Racquetball European Championships: Germany 2011 -
- Men teams
Champions	Germany
Runners-up	(Republic of Ireland) Ireland
Third place	Italy
- Ladies teams
Champions	Germany
Runners-up	(Republic of Ireland) Ireland
Third place	Italy
- Men's Single
Champion	(Germany) Eric Gordon
Runner-up	(Germany) Trevor Meyer
- Women's Single
Champion	(Germany) Andrea Gordon
Runner-up	(Germany) Yvonne Mesecke
- Men's Doubles
Champions	(Germany) T. Meyer / J. Loof
Runner-up	(Germany) E. Gordon / O. Bertels
- Women's Doubles
Champions	(Republic of Ireland) M. Haverty / K. Kenny
Runner-up	(Germany) Y. Mesecke / L. Ludwig

The XVI Racquetball European Championships were held in Bad Tölz, near Munich, (Germany) from August 1 to 7 2011, with five countries represented. The venue was the Racquetball Club Bad Tölz e.V., with 3 regulation racquetball courts. 50 players competed in the singles, doubles, junior and senior competitions. The opening ceremony was on August 1 with the vice president of the European Racquetball Federation, Mike Mesecke, and the president of the German Racquetball Federation, Jörg Ludwig.

The 2011 European Racquetball Championships were the third European Championships that were held in Bad Tölz after 1995 and 1999.

== Men's national teams competition ==
=== August 1/2, 2011 ===
GROUP A	W	L	GW	GL
Germany	2	0	4	2
(Republic of Ireland) Ireland	1	1	5	1
Italy	0	2	1	5

10:15
10:15	Ireland	3-0	Italy
10:15	M. Murphy; J. O'Keeney; D. Gargan / M. Murphy	15-1, 15-0; 15-0, 15-1; 15-4, 15-13	B. Zonca; M. Corcione; Arnoldi / Zonca

14:00
14:00	Italy	1-2	Germany
14:00	B. Zonca; M. Corcione; Arnoldi / Zonca	4-15, 2-15; 0-15, 2-15 wbf	E. Gordon; S. Macaluso; Schmitz / Bertels

13:00
13:00	Ireland	2-1	Germany
13:00	M. Murphy; J. O'Keeney; D. Gargan / M. Murphy	6-15, 13-15; 14-15, 15-11, 5-11; 15-6, 2-15, 11-8	E. Gordon; S. Macaluso; Schmitz / Bertels

Champions
GERMANY

=== Men's teams final standings ===
Men's Team
1	Germany
2	(Republic of Ireland) Ireland
3	Italy

== Women's national teams competition ==
Women	W	L	GW	GL
(Republic of Ireland) Ireland	1	0	3	0
Germany	0	1	0	3

August 2, 2011; 13:30
August 2, 2011; 13:30	Ireland	1-2	Germany
August 2, 2011; 13:30	D. Ryder; M. Haverty; Kenny / Haverty	15-3, 15-8; 15-6, 15-14, 10-11; 5-15, 15-13, 9-11	A. Gordon; Y. Mesecke; Mesecke / Ludwig

Champions
GERMANY

=== Women's teams final standings ===
Women's Team
1	Germany
2	(Republic of Ireland) Ireland

== Men's Single competition ==
First round
1	O. Bertels (GER)
17	D. Gargan (IRL)	15	15
16	R. Langmeier (GER)	2	3
9	J. Lysakowski (AUT)
8	B. Zonca (ITA)
5	J. O Kenney (IRL)
21	C. Geibelt (GER)
12
13	F. Mosshammer (GER)
20
4	T. Meyer (GER)
3	A. Schmitz (GER)
19	P. Rakowski (POL)	15	15
14	T. Zuber (GER)	3	1
11	R. Angelillo (GER)
22
6	J. Loof (GER)
7	M. Murphy (IRL)
10	M. Mesecke (GER)
15	S. Macaluso (GER)	15	15
18	M. Domanico (ITA)	3	5
2	E. Gordon (GER)

Second round
1	O. Bertels	15	15
17	D. Gargan	2	3
9	J. Lysakowski	15	15
8	B. Zonca	3	4
5	J. O Kenney	15	15
12	C. Geibelt	1	0
13	F. Mosshammer	0	0
4	T. Meyer	15	15
3	A. Schmitz	w	b	f
14	TP. Rakowski	0	0
11	R. Angelillo	4	3
6	J. Loof	15	15
7	M. Murphy	15	15
10	M. Mesecke	6	6
18	S. Macaluso	2	1
2	E. Gordon	15	15

Quarterfinals
1	O. Bertels	15	7	2
9	J. O Kenney	7	10
5	T. Meyer	15	15
4	A. Schmitz	2	15	4
3	J. Loof	15	10
2	C. Oviedo	15	15
10	M. Murphy	15	8	4
3	E. Gordon	13	15	11

Semifinals
1	O. Bertels	15	7	1
4	T. Meyer	14	15	11
6	J. Loof	2	6
2	E. Gordon	15	15

Final
1	T. Meyer	1	7
6	E. Gordon	15	15

Winner
ERIC GORDON (Germany)

== Women's Single competition ==
First round
1	Y. Mesecke (GER)
9	S.Jorzik (IRL)	15	15
8	B. Mitten (IRL)	7	9
5	D. Ryder (IRL)
12
13
4	L Ludwig (GER)
3	M. Haverty (IRL)
14
11	S. Moy (GER)	15	15
6	C. Lynch (IRL)	4	7
7	K. Kenny (IRL)	15	15
10	C. Boerschlein (GER)	2	0
2	A. Gordon (GER)

Quarterfinals
1	Y. Mesecke	15	15
8	S. Jorzik	7	9
5	D. Ryder	15	15
4	L. Ludwig	7	3
3	M. Haverty	15	15
6	S. Moy	9	2
7	A. Gordon	15	15
2	K. Kenny	9	7

Semifinals
1	Y. Mesecke	15	15
4	D. Ryder	12	12
6	M. Haverty	7	2
2	A. Gordon	15	15

Final
1	Y. Mesecke	5	1
2	A. Gordon	15	15

Winner
ANDREA GORDON (Germany)

== Men's Doubles competition ==
First round
1	J. Loof / T. Meyer (GER)	15	15
C. Geibelt / R. Angelillo (GER)	6	10
9	S. Macaluso / T. Zuber (GER)	11	4
8	D. Gargan / J. O'Keeney (IRL)	15	15
5	J. Gannon / M. Murphy(IRL)	15	15
12	A. Schmitz / M. Mesecke (GER)	8	12
13	F. Mosshammer / P. Rakowski (GER)(POL)	1	10
4	E. Gordon / O. Bertels (GER)	15	15

Semifinals
1	Loof / Meyer	15	15
8	Gargan / O'Keeney	14	10
5	Gannon / Murphy	8	8
4	Gordon / Bertels	15	15

Final
1	Loof / Meyer	15	15
2	Gordon / Bertels	5	6

Winner
JOACHIM LOOF & TREVOR MEYER (Germany)

== Ladies Doubles competition ==
First round
1	M. Haverty / K. Kenny (IRL)
bye
9	A. Gordon / B. Mitten (GER) (IRL)
8	S. Jorczik / S. Moy (GER)	n	s
5	D. Ryder / C. Lynch (IRL)
12
13
4	Y. Mesecke / L. Ludwig (GER)

Semifinals
1	Haverty / Kenny	15	11	2
8	Jorzik / Moy	7	15	2
5	Ryder / Lynch
4	Mesecke / Ludwig	w	b	f

Final
1	Haverty / Kenny	13	15	11
2	Mesecke / Ludwig	15	13	7

Winner
MAJELLA HAVERTY & KATIE KENNY (Republic of Ireland)

== See also ==
- European Racquetball Championships
