= 2013 European Racquetball Championships =

Tournament details
- Dates: 15–20 July
- Edition: 17
- Nations: 7
- Venue: Centro Sportivo di Brembate
- Location: Brembate, Italy

- XVII Racquetball European Championships: Italy 2013 -
- Men teams
Champions	(Republic of Ireland) Ireland
Runners-up	Germany
Third place	Catalonia
Fourth place	Italy
- Women teams
Champions	(Republic of Ireland) Ireland
Runners-up	Germany
Third place	Catalonia
- Men's Single
Champion	(Republic of Ireland) Noel O Callaghan
Runner-up	(Germany) Trevor Meyer
- Women's Single
Champion	(Republic of Ireland) Aisling Hickey
Runner-up	(Germany) Andrea Gordon
- Men's Doubles
Champions	(Republic of Ireland) Quinn / Murphy
Runner-up	(Republic of Ireland) O'keeney / Devenney
- Women's Doubles
Champions	(Republic of Ireland) Breen / O'Callaghan
Runner-up	(Republic of Ireland) Kenny / Ryder

The XVII Racquetball European Championships were held in Brembate, (Italy) from July 15–20 2013, with men's national and women's national teams in competition. In addition to the European Championships, the European Racquetball Masters and Junior Racquetball Championships were held at the same time. The venue was the Centro Communale Spotivo di Brembate, with 2 regulation racquetball court. The opening ceremony was held on July 19 .

== Men's Singles Competition ==
First round
1	T. Meyer (GER)	15	15
16	M. Arnoldi (ITA)	2	2
8	C. Skehan (IRL)	15	15
9	B. Zonca (ITA)	3	7
5	J. Lysakowski (AUT)	15	15
12	T. Baghurst (ENG)	11	2
13	C. Papini (ITA)
4	M. Murphy(ITA)	w	b	f
3	N. O'Callghan (IRL)	15	15
N. Krieger (GER)	6	1
6	S. Lyng (IRL)	10	15	8
11	A. Schmitz (GER)	15	8	11
7	M. Bizeau (FRA)	4	0
10	S. Quinn (IRL)	15	15
15	M. Corcione (ITA)	6	3
2	O. Bertels (GER)	15	15

Quarterfinals
1	T. Meyer	11	14	11
8	C. Skehan	15	14	3
5	J. Lysakowski	11	15	8
4	M. Murphy	15	13	11
3	N. O'Callaghan	15	15
6	A. Schmitz	3	4
7	S. Quinn	10	6
2	O. Bertels	15	15

Semifinals
1	T. Mayer	15	11	3
4	Q. Murphy	11	15	3
3	N. O'Calligahn	15	15
4	O. Beetles	13	7

Final Countdown
1	T. Meyer	4	10
2	N. O'Callaghan	15	15

Winner
NOEL O Callaghan (Republic of Ireland)

== Women's Single competition ==
First round
1	A. Gordon (GER)	15	15
B. Mitten (IRL)	4	1
9	K. Ryan (IRL)	15	15
8	K. Kenny (IRL)	6	5
5	L. Ludwig (GER)	11	7
12	D. Ryder (IRL)	15	15
13	S. Heidrich (GER)	12	14
4	A. Hickey (IRL)	15	15

Semifinals
1	A. Gordon	15	15	11
8	K. Ryan	15	13	3
5	D. Ryder	6	12
4	A. Hickey	15	15

Final
1	A. Gordon	2	6
4	A. Hickey	15	15

Winner
AISLING HICKEY (Republic of Ireland)

== Men's Doubles Competition ==
First round
1	A. Schmitz / O. Bertels (GER)
16
8	M. Bizeau / N. Krieger (FRA) (GER)	15	15
9	M. Arnoldi / M. Corzione (ITA)	10	10
5	C. Skehan /T. Baghurst (IRL) (ENG)
12
13
4	R. Breen / N. O'Callaghan (IRL)
3	S. Quinn / M. Murphy (IRL)
14
6
11	B. Zonca / J. Lysakowski (ITA)(AUT)	15	8
7	J. Gannon / S. Lyng (IRL)
10
15
2	P. Rakowski / T. Meyer (POL)(GER)	15	15

Quarterfinals
1	Bertels / Schmitz	15	15
8	Bizeau / Krieger	8	0
5	Skehan / Baghurst	1	7
4	Breen / O'Callaghan	15	15
3	Quinn / Murphy	15	15
6	Zonca / Lysakowski	1	7
7	Gannon / Lyng	w	b	f
2	Rakowski / Meyer

Semifinals
1	Schmitz / Bertels	8	2
4	Breen / O'Callaghan	15	15
3	Quinn /Murphy	15	14	5
4	Gannon / Lyng	7	15	5

Final
1	Breen / O'Callaghan	5	11
2	Quinn / Murphy	15	15

Winner
STEVIE QUINN & MARK MURPHY (Republic of Ireland)

== Women's Doubles competition ==
Ladies Doubles	W	L	GW	GL
(Republic of Ireland) Hickey/Ryan	2	0	4	1
(Republic of Ireland) Kenny/Ryder	1	1	3	2
(Germany) Ludwig/Heidrich	0	2	0	4

Winner
AISLING HICKEY & KATE RYAN (Republic of Ireland)

== See also ==
- European Racquetball Championships
