= Brembate =

- Comune
- Comune di Brembate
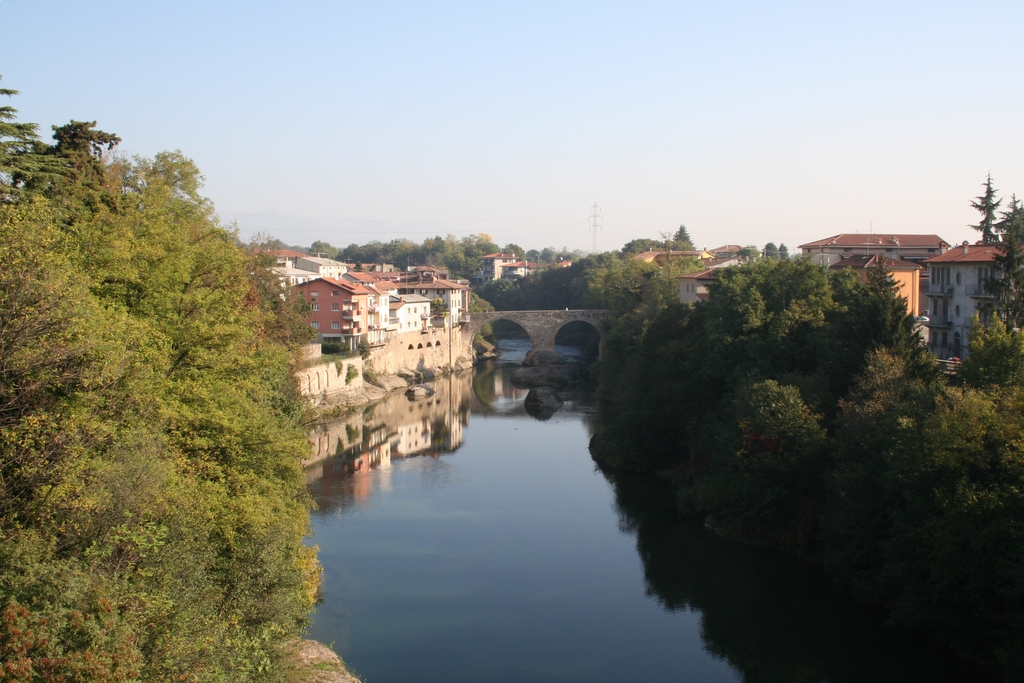
- Brembo River in Brembate

- Coat of arms

- Location within Italy Location within Lombardy
- Coordinates: 45°36′N 9°33′E
- Country: Italy
- Region: Lombardy
- Province: Province of Bergamo (BG)
- Frazioni: Grignano

Area
  - Total: 5.5 km^{2} (2.1 sq mi)
- Elevation: 173 m (568 ft)

Population (Dec. 2010)
  - Total: 8,234
  - Density: 1,500/km^{2} (3,900/sq mi)
- Demonym: Brembatesi
- Time zone: UTC+1 (CET)
  - Summer (DST): UTC+2 (CEST)
- Postal code: 24041
- Dialing code: 035
- Website: Official website

Brembate (Bergamasque: Brembàt) is a comune (municipality) in the Province of Bergamo in the Italian region of Lombardy, located about 35 kilometres (22 mi) northeast of Milan and about 14 kilometres (9 mi) southwest of Bergamo. As of 31 December 2010, it had a population of 8,234 and an area of 5.5 square kilometres (2.1 mi^{2}).

The municipality of Brembate only contains the frazione (subdivision) Grignano.

Brembate borders the following municipalities: Boltiere, Canonica d'Adda, Capriate San Gervasio, Filago, Osio Sotto, Pontirolo Nuovo.

== Demographic evolution ==
Historical population

Year	Pop.	±%
1861	2,046	—
1871	2,312	+13.0%
1881	2,394	+3.5%
1901	2,814	+17.5%
1911	3,279	+16.5%

Year	Pop.	±%
1921	3,445	+5.1%
1931	3,734	+8.4%
1936	3,826	+2.5%
1951	4,456	+16.5%
1961	4,891	+9.8%

Year	Pop.	±%
1971	5,448	+11.4%
1981	5,897	+8.2%
1991	6,240	+5.8%
2001	7,180	+15.1%

Source: Data from ISTAT
