= European Racquetball Federation =

- Abbreviation: ERF
- Formation: 1985
- Type: Sports organization
- Headquarters: Zoetermeer, Netherlands
- Region served: Europe
- Members: 10 member associations
- President: (Germany) Mike Mesecke
- Vice-president: (Italy) Carlo Papini
- Gen. Secretary: (Netherlands) Mikan van Zanten
- Treasurer: (Netherlands) Karel Matla
- Parent organization: International Racquetball Federation
- Website: www.racquetball.eu

The European Racquetball Federation (ERF) is the governing body for racquetball in Europe to promote the sport of racquetball in Europe. The ERF was founded on 27 June 1985 in Zoetermeer, The Netherlands.

Every two years the ERF organizes the European Racquetball Championships, and every year organizes the European Racquetball Tour (ERT).

== Presidents ==
No.	Years	Name
1	1985–1997	(Germany) Jürgen Denk
2	1997–2011	(Belgium) Erik Meyer
3	2011–	(Germany) Mike Mesecke

== List of members ==
Members of European Racquetball Federation (ERF)
	Member	Website	President
Belgium	Belgian Racquetball Federation	http://www.raquetball.be/	Erik Meyer
Catalonia	Federació Catalana de Raquetbol	https://web.archive.org/web/20101003174133/http://www.raquetbol.cat/	Josep Ripoll
France	Fédération Française de Racquetball	www.france-racquetball.org	Philippe Lecomte
Germany	Deutscher Racquetball Verband	http://www.racquetball.de/	Jörg Ludwig
(Republic of Ireland) Ireland	Racquetball Association of Ireland	http://www.racquetball.ie/	Martin Lawless
Italy	Associazione Racquetball Italia	https://web.archive.org/web/20110722050602/http://www.racquetballitalia.it/	Pierro Landa
Netherlands	Nederlandse Racquetball Associatie	http://www.racquetball.nl/	Erik Timmermanns
Poland	Polska Racquetball		Peter Rakowski
Sweden	Swedish Racquetball Federation	https://web.archive.org/web/20090413143250/http://www.racquetball.se/	
Turkey	Racquetball Turkey		Ayten Kececci

== Events ==
European Championships, Team and Individual European Masters Championships European Juniors Championships

== See also ==
- European Racquetball Championships
- European Racquetball Tour
- Racquetball
