= 2010 Racquetball World Championships =

- XV Racquetball World Championships: South Korea 2010 -
Host	Seoul; South Korea
Dates	August 13 - August 21
- Men's singles
Gold	(United States) Rocky Carson
Silver	(United States) Jack Huczek
Bronze	(Bolivia) Ricardo Monroy, (Canada) Vincent Gagnon
- Women's singles
Gold	(United States) Rhonda Rajsich
Silver	(Mexico) Nancy Enriquez
Bronze	(Mexico) Paola Longoria, (United States) Cheryl Gudinas
- Men's doubles
Gold	(United States) Ben Croft & Mitch Williams
Silver	(Canada) Mike Green & Tim Landeryou
Bronze	(Venezuela) Cesar Castro & Jorge Hirsekorn, (Mexico) Alejandro Landa & Miguel Perea
- Women's doubles
Gold	(Mexico) Paola Longoria & Samantha Salas
Silver	(United States) Jackie Paraiso & Aimee Ruiz
Bronze	(Canada) Frédérique Lambert & Brandi Jacobson Prentice, (Japan) Naomi Wakimoto & Toshiko Sakamoto
- Men teams
Champions	United States
Runners-up	Canada
Third place	Bolivia, Costa Rica
- Women teams
Champions	United States
Runners-up	Canada
Third place	Mexico, South Korea

The 15th Racquetball World Championships were held in Seoul (South Korea) from August 13 to 21, 2010, with 16 men's national teams and 11 women's national teams; and several players in the singles and doubles competition.

The incumbent champions in men's and women's singles were Americans Rocky Carson and Rhonda Rajsich, respectively, and they successfully defended their titles in Seoul.

In doubles, the Americans successfully defended the men's doubles title. Mitch Williams was part of the winning team again, although in 2010 he won with Ben Croft, while in 2008 Jason Thoerner was his partner.

In women's doubles, Paola Longoria and Samantha Salas broke a 22-year streak of American victories by defeating the defending champions Jackie Paraiso and Aimee Ruiz and claiming the first women's doubles title for Mexico.

== Men's singles competition ==
First round
33	(Chinese Taipei) Wien-Chang Wen	1, 2
32	(Argentina) Danny Maggi	15, 15
41	0
24
25
40
37	(China) Jeff Hwang	7, 3
28	(India) Raaj Mohan	15, 15
21
44
45
20
29	(Colombia) Francisco Gomez	15, 15
36	(Tonga) Sitaram Vananran	2, 1
35	(United Kingdom) Timothy Baghurst	3, 6
30	(Argentina) Shai Manzuri	15, 15
43
22
27
38
31	(Chinese Taipei) Choung-Yew Chang	4, 4
34	(Tonga) Siaosi Palauni	15, 15

Second round
1	(United States) Jack Huczek	15, 15
33	(Argentina) Daniel Maggi	13, 12
17	(Costa Rica) Ivan Villegas	15, 15
16	(Dominican Republic) Simón Perdomo	12, 5
9	(Japan) Michimune Kono	15, 15
24	(Guatemala) Luis Meza	5, 2
25	(Republic of Ireland) Patrick Hanley	3, 12
8	(Venezuela) Marcelo Laprea	15, 15
5	(Canada) Vincent Gagnon	15, 15
37	(India) Raaj Mohan	4, 6
21	(Catalonia) Carlos Oviedo	15, 6, 11
12	(Bolivia) Amol Rocha	4, 15, 7
13	(South Korea) Daeyong Kwon	15, 15
20	(Ecuador) Jose Daniel Alvarez	7, 9
29	(Colombia) Francisco Gómez	15, 15
4	(Mexico) Eduardo Avila	10, 3
3	(United States) Rocky Carson	13, 15, 11
35	(Argentina) Shai Manzuri	15, 8, 4
19	(Costa Rica) Felipe Camacho	14, 15, 8
14	(Dominican Republic) Luis Pérez	15, 13, 11
11	(Japan) Takaaki Hirose	15, 15
22	(Guatemala) Christian Wer	6, 12
38	(Colombia) Alejandro Herrera	15, 15
6	(Venezuela) Cesar Castro	11, 12
7	(Canada) Kris Odegard	15, 15
26	(India) Sathwik Rai	2, 1
23	(Republic of Ireland) Joseph Dillon	4, 5
10	(Bolivia) Ricardo Monroy	15, 15
15	(South Korea) Seung Jun Jeon	10, 15, 10
18	(Ecuador) Fernando Rios	15, 15, 11
34	(Tonga) Siaosi Palauni	5, 4
2	(Mexico) Alejandro Landa	15, 15

Third round
1	(United States) Jack Huczek	15, 15
16	(Costa Rica) Ivan Villegas	2, 4
9	(Japan) Michimune Kono	15, 15
25	(Venezuela) Marcelo Laprea	13, 8
5	(Canada) Vincent Gagnon	15, 15
12	(Catalonia) Carlos Oviedo	6, 6
20	(South Korea) Daeyong Kwon	9, 3
4	(Colombia) Francisco Gomez	15, 15
3	(United States) Rocky Carson	15, 15
14	(Dominican Republic) Luis Pérez	6, 9
11	(Japan) Takaaki Hirose	4, 10
38	(Colombia) Alejandro Herrera	15, 15
7	(Canada) Kris Odegard	9, 0
10	(Bolivia) Ricardo Monroy	15, 15
18	(Ecuador) Fernando Ríos	4, 15, 7
2	(Mexico) Alejandro Landa	15, 13, 11

Quarterfinals
1	(United States) Jack Huczek	15, 15
25	(Japan) Michimune Kono	3, 2
5	(Canada) Vincent Gagnon	15, 15
4	(Colombia) Francisco Gómez	5, 12
3	(United States) Rocky Carson	15, 15
11	(Colombia) Alejandro Herrera	1, 8
10	(Bolivia) Ricardo Monroy	14, 15, 11
2	(Mexico) Alejandro Landa	15, 9, 10

Semifinals
1	(United States) Jack Huczek	15, 15
4	(Canada) Vincent Gagnon	12, 12
3	(United States) Rocky Carson	15, 15
10	(Bolivia) Ricardo Monroy	13, 12

Final
1	(United States) Jack Huczek	13, 14
3	(United States) Rocky Carson	15, 15

Winner
Rocky Carson (United States)

== Women's singles competition ==
First round
1	(United States) Rhonda Rajsich
32	BYE
17	(Dominican Republic) Claudine García	15, 15
16	(Venezuela) Vivianna Reveron	7, 7
9	(Bolivia) Jenny Daza Navia	15, 15
24	(Tonga) Sela Brown	3, 2
25	(Argentina) Véronique Guillemette	9, 8
8	(Japan) Maiko Sato	15, 15
5	(Mexico) Paola Longoria
28	BYE
21	(Guatemala) Marie Gomar	5, 5
12	(Ecuador) Cristina Cordova	15, 15
13	(Dominican Republic) Jin Young Seok	15, 15
20	(Republic of Ireland) Katie Kenny	2, 4
29	BYE
4	(Canada) Josée Grand'Maître
3	(United States) Cheryl Gudinas
30	BYE
19	(Costa Rica) Deborah Kessler	11, 7
14	(Venezuela) Mariana Paredes	15, 15
11	(Bolivia) Maria Jose Vargas	15, 14, 11
22	(Colombia) Cristina Amaya	14, 15, 8
27	BYE
6	(Japan) Etsuko Noda
7	(Mexico) Nancy Enriquez	15, 15
26	(Tonga) Pianola Tua'one	4, 1
23	(Guatemala) María Renee Rodríguez	5, 1
10	(Ecuador) Maria Paz Muñoz	15, 15
15	(South Korea) Jung Eun Anh	15, 15
18	(Republic of Ireland) Majella Haverty	2, 0
31	BYE
2	(Canada) Jennifer Saunders

Second round
1	(United States) Rhonda Rajsich	15, 15
17	(Dominican Republic) Claudine García	3, 2
9	(Bolivia) Jenny Daza Navia	14, 15, 3
8	(Japan) Maiko Sato	15, 12, 11
5	(Mexico) Paola Longoria	15, 15
12	(Ecuador) Cristina Córdova	4, 3
20	(South Korea) Jin Young Seok	15, 15
4	(Canada) Josée Grand'Maître	8, 6
3	(United States) Cheryl Gudinas	15, 15
14	(Venezuela) Islhey Mariana Paredes	6, 1
11	(Bolivia) Maria Jose Vargas	15, 3, 11
6	(Japan) Etsuko Noda	5, 15, 10
7	(Mexico) Nancy Enriquez	15, 14, 11
10	(Ecuador) Maria Paz Munoz	3, 15, 6
18	(South Korea) Jung Eun Anh	8, 15, 4
2	(Canada) Jennifer Saunders	15, 11, 11

Quarterfinals
1	(United States) Rhonda Rajsich	15, 15
8	(Japan) Maiko Sato	7, 11
5	(Mexico) Paola Longoria	15, 15
4	(South Korea) Jin Young Seok	3, 4
3	(United States) Cheryl Gudinas	15, 15
11	(Ecuador) Maria Jose Vargas	9, 7
7	(Mexico) Nancy Enriquez	15, 15
2	(Canada) Jennifer Saunders	9, 9

Semifinals
1	(United States) Rhonda Rajsich	9, 15, 11
5	(Mexico) Paola Longoria	15, 10, 5
3	(United States) Cheryl Gudinas	15, 14, 5
7	(Mexico) Nancy Enriquez	5, 15, 11

Final
1	(United States) Rhonda Rajsich	15, 15
7	(Mexico) Nancy Enriquez	8, 11

Winner
Rhonda Rajsich (United States)

== Men's doubles competition ==
Round of 32
1	(United States) Ben Croft & Mitch Williams
17	(Tonga) Loleni Tuaone & Tevita Tangulu	Forfeit
16	(Chinese Taipei) Wen-chang Went & Choung-yew Chang
9	(Costa Rica) Ivan Villegas & Felipe Camacho
8	(Guatemala) Christian Wer & Luis Meza
5	(Japan) Michimune Kono & Hiroshi Shimizu
12	(South Korea) Min Soo Park & Dong Min-jang
13	(India) Srikaran Kandadai & Raaj Mohan
4	(Venezuela) Cesar Castro & Jorge Hirsekorn
3	(Canada) Mike Green & Tim Landeryou
14	(Republic of Ireland) Patrick Hanley & Joseph Dillon
11	(Dominican Republic) Luis Pérez & Simón Perdomo
6	(Argentina) Shai Mazuri & Daniel Maggi
7	(Bolivia) Ricardo Monroy & Carlos Keller Vargas
10	(Ecuador) Jose Daniel Alvarez & Fernando Rios
15	(Colombia) Juan Herrera & Alejandro Herrera
2	(Mexico) Alejandro Landa & Miguel Perea

Round of 16
1	(United States) USA	15, 15
17	Tonga	3, 2
9	Costa Rica	15, 15
8	Guatemala	14, 11
5	Japan	11, 11
12	South Korea	15, 15
13	India	1, 4
4	Venezuela	15, 15
3	Canada	15, 15
14	(Republic of Ireland) Ireland	6, 4
11	Dominican Republic	15, 3, 10
6	Argentina	8, 15, 11
7	Bolivia	15, 10, 9
10	Ecuador	10, 15, 11
15	Colombia	8, 12
2	Mexico	15, 15

Quarter finals
1	(United States) USA	15, 15
9	Costa Rica	6, 13
12	South Korea	2, 11
4	Venezuela	15, 15
3	Canada	7, 15, 11
6	Argentina	15, 7, 3
10	Ecuador	7, 15, 9
2	Mexico	15, 8, 11

Semi finals
1	(United States) USA	15, 6, 11
4	Venezuela	10, 15, 5
3	Canada	15, 15
2	Mexico	2, 5

Finals
1	(United States) USA	15, 15
3	Canada	2, 13

Winners
(United States) Ben Croft & Mitch Williams

== Women's doubles competition ==
Round of 16
1	(United States) Jackie Paraiso & Aimee Ruiz
16	BYE
9	(Guatemala) Maria Renee Rodriguez & Marie Gomar	4, 8
8	(Venezuela) Islhey Mariana Paredes & Vivianna Reveron	15, 15
5	(Bolivia) Jenny Daza Navia & Maria Jose Vargas
12	BYE
4	(Japan) Naomi Wakimoto & Toshiko Sakamoto
3	(Mexico) Paola Longoria & Samantha Salas
14	BYE
11	(Tonga) Pianola Tua'one & Sela Brown	1, 0
6	(Ecuador) Cristina Cordova & Maria Paz Muñoz	15, 15
7	(South Korea) Young-mi Lee & Yunhui Yu	15, 15
10	(Republic of Ireland) Katie Kenny & Majella Haverty	2, 10
BYE
2	(Canada) Frédérique Lambert & Brandi Jacobson Prentice

Quarter-finals
1	(United States) USA	15, 15
8	(Venezuela)	5, 5
5	Bolivia	15, 15
4	Japan	12, 2
3	Mexico	15, 15
6	Ecuador	2, 5
7	South Korea	9, 6
2	Canada	15, 15

Semi-finals
1	(United States) USA	15, 15
4	Japan	9, 3
3	Mexico	15, 15
2	Canada	8, 6

Final
1	(United States) USA	15, 13, 4
3	Mexico	13, 15, 11

Winners
Paola Longoria & Samantha Salas

== Men's team competition ==
Round of 16
1	United States	2
16	Tonga	1
8	Japan	1
9	South Korea	2
5	Bolivia	3
12	India	0
13	Guatemala	1
4	Venezuela	2
3	Mexico	2
14	Dominican Republic	1
11	(Republic of Ireland) Ireland	0
6	Costa Rica	3
7	Ecuador	3
10	Argentina	0
15	Colombia	0
2	Canada	3

Quarter finals
1	(United States) USA	2
9	South Korea	1
5	Bolivia	2
4	Venezuela	1
3	Mexico	1
6	Costa Rica	2
7	Ecuador	1
2	Canada	2

Semifinals
1	(United States) USA	3
5	Bolivia	0
6	Costa Rica	0
2	Canada	3

Final
1	(United States) USA	3
2	Canada	0

Winners
United States

== Women's team competition ==
Round of 16
1	United States
BYE
9	Guatemala	0
8	Ecuador	3
5	Japan
12	BYE
4	Mexico
3	Bolivia
14	BYE
11	Tonga	0
6	South Korea	3
7	Venezuela	2
10	(Republic of Ireland) Ireland	1
BYE
2	Canada

Quarter finals
1	(United States) USA	2
8	Ecuador	1
5	Japan	1
4	Mexico	2
3	Bolivia	1
6	South Korea	2
7	Venezuela	1
2	Canada	2

Semifinals
1	(United States) USA	2
4	Mexico	1
6	South Korea	1
2	Canada	2

Final
1	(United States) USA	3
2	Canada	0

Winners
United States

== See also ==
- Racquetball World Championships
