= 2008 Racquetball World Championships =

- XIV Racquetball World Championships: Ireland 2008 -
Host	(Republic of Ireland) Kingscourt
Dates	August 2–9
- Men teams
Champions	United States
Runners-up	Mexico
Third place	Canada
Fourth place	Bolivia
- Women teams
Champions	United States
Runners-up	Bolivia
Third place	Canada
Fourth place	Chile

The 14th Racquetball World Championships were held in Kingscourt (Ireland) from August 2 to 9, 2008, with 22 men's national teams and 15 women's national teams, and several players in the singles and doubles competition.

== Men's team competition ==
First round
17	(Republic of Ireland) Ireland	2
16	(Dominican Republic) Dominican R.	1
21	Poland	0
12	South Korea	3
13	Guatemala	1
20	Catalonia	2
19	Belgium
14	Germany
11	Ecuador	wo
22	Chinese Taipei
15	Netherlands
18	Honduras

Second round
1	United States	3
17	(Republic of Ireland) Ireland	0
9	Chile	1
8	Japan	2
5	Bolivia	3
12	South Korea	0
20	Catalonia	1
4	Venezuela	2
3	Mexico	2
14	(Germany)	1
11	Ecuador	3
6	India	0
7	Argentina	1
10	Costa Rica	2
15	Netherlands	0
2	Canada	3

Quarterfinals
1	United States	3
8	(Japan)	0
5	Bolivia	2
4	Venezuela	1
3	Mexico	2
11	Ecuador	1
10	Costa Rica	1
2	Canada	2

Semifinals
1	(United States) USA	3
5	Bolivia	0
3	Mexico	2
2	Canada	1

Final
1	(United States) USA	2
2	Mexico	1

Winners

== Women's team competition ==
Round of 16
9	Guatemala	1
8	Venezuela	2
5	Chile	3
12	Ecuador	0
13	Costa Rica	0
4	Mexico	3
3	Japan	3
14	Catalonia	0
11	(Germany)	0
6	Bolivia	3
7	South Korea	3
10	(Republic of Ireland) Ireland	0
15	Honduras	0
2	Canada	3

Quarterfinals
1	United States	3
8	Venezuela	0
5	Chile	2
4	Mexico	1
3	(Japan)	1
6	Bolivia	2
7	South Korea
2	Canada

Semi-finals
1	United States	wo
5	Chile
6	Bolivia	2
2	Canada	1

Final
1	United States	2
6	Bolivia	1

Winners

== Men's singles competition ==
First round
33	(Guatemala) Karl Boer	13, 15, 11
32	(Honduras) Yelso Molinari	15, 14, 8
41	(Poland) Peter Rakowski	10, 5
24	(Chile) Pablo Fajre	15, 15
25	(Ecuador) Fernando Ríos	15, 15
40	(Catalonia) Carlos Oviedo	6, 2
37	(Belgium) Niklaas Deboutte	15, 12, 11
28	(India) Sid Harshavat	7, 15, 7
21	(Netherlands) Richard van Doezum	15, 15
44	(Chinese Taipei) Wen Wen-chang	7, 0
45	(Brazil) Mauro Barbosa	2, 1
20	(Costa Rica) Felipe Camacho	15, 15
29	(Argentina) Danny Maggi	15, 15
36	(Republic of Ireland) Noel O'callaghan	5, 8
35	(Guatemala) Christian Wer	15, 15
30	(Honduras) Gerardo Fajardo	4, 12
43	(Poland) Jakob Kuzniacki	0, 1
22	(Chile) Sebastian Roessler	15, 15
27	(Ecuador) José Daniel Ugalde	15, 11, 7
38	(Catalonia) Víctor Montserrat	10, 15, 11
39	(Belgium) Paul Devos	7
26	(India) Nanda Gudderra	13, injury fft
23	(Netherlands) Michiel van der Holst	15, 15
42	(Chinese Taipei) Huang-jung Hsu	4, 2
31	(Argentina) Fabián Apa	5, 3
34	(Republic of Ireland) Liam Hugues	15, 15

Second round
1	(United States) Rocky Carson	15, 15
33	(Guatemala) Karl Boer	0, 4
17	(Germany) Marcel Czempisz	4, 4
16	(Dominican Republic) Leonel Simó	15, 15
9	(Japan) Takaaki Hirose	11, 15, 11
24	(Chile) Pablo Fajre	15, 8, 0
25	(Ecuador) Fernando Ríos	15, 15
8	(Venezuela) Marcelo Laprea	2, 5
5	(Canada) Mike Green	15, 15
37	(Belgium) Nickolas Deboutte	3, 0
21	(Netherlands) Richard van Doezum	13, 3
12	(Bolivia) Jorge Zambrana	15, 15
13	(South Korea) Sung Suk Kim	15, 3, 4
20	F. Camacho	11, 15, 11
29	(Argentina) Danny Maggi	12, 9
4	(Mexico) Alvaro Beltrán	15, 15
3	(United States) Jack Huczek	15, 15
35	(Guatemala) Christian Wer	0, 4
19	(Germany) Oliver Bertels	13, 9
14	(Dominican Republic) Luis Pérez	15, 15
11	(Japan) Michimune Kono	15, 15
22	(Chile) Sebastian Roessler	9, 12
38	(Catalonia) Victor Montserrat	15, 15
6	(Venezuela) Fabian Balmori	9, 9
7	(Canada) Vincent Gagnon	15, 15
26	(India) Nanda Gudderra	1, 2
23	(Netherlands) Michael van der Holst	5, 12
10	(Bolivia) Ricardo Monroy	15, 15
15	(South Korea) Sang Soo Lee	12, 15, 7
18	(Costa Rica) Ivan Villegas	15, 12, 11
34	(Republic of Ireland) Liam Hughes	3, 1
2	(Mexico) Polo Gutierrez	15, 15

Third round
1	(United States) Rocky Carson	15, 15
16	(Dominican Republic) Leonel Simó	9, 1
9	(Japan) Takaaki Hirose	7, 4
25	(Ecuador) Fernando Ríos	15, 15
5	(Canada) Mike Green	15, 15
12	(Bolivia) Jorge Zambrana	8, 7
20	(Costa Rica) Felipe Camacho	12, 12
4	(Mexico) Álvaro Beltrán	15, 15
3	(United States) Jack Huczek	15, 15
14	(Dominican Republic) Luis Pérez	0, 5
11	(Japan) Michimune Kono	15, 15
38	(Catalonia) Victor Montserrat	4, 4
7	(Canada) Vincent Gagnon	15, 15
10	(Bolivia) Ricardo Monroy	11, 11
18	(Costa Rica) Ivan Villegas	12, 1
2	(Mexico) Polo Gutierrez	15, 15

Quarterfinals
1	(United States) Rocky Carson	15, 15
25	(Ecuador) Fernando Ríos	3, 4
5	(Canada) Mike Green	14, 10
4	(Mexico) Álvaro Beltrán	15, 15
3	(United States) Jack Huczek	15, 15
11	(Japan) Michimune Kono	3, 4
7	(Canada) Vincent Gagnon	15, 11, 11
2	(Mexico) Polo Gutiérrez	5, 15, 8

Semifinals
1	(United States) Rocky Carson	15, 15
4	(Mexico) Álvaro Beltrán	9, 8
Final
1	(United States) Rocky Carson	12, 15, 11
3	(United States) Jack Huczek	15, 14, 10
3	(United States) Jack Huczek	15, 15
7	(Canada) Vincent Gagnon	11, 8

Winner

== Women's singles competition ==
First round
1	(United States) Rhonda Rajsich	15, 15
32	(Honduras) Maria Aguilar	3, 0
17	(Venezuela) Vivianna Reveron	15, 10, 7
16	(South Korea) Jeong Ae Lee	6, 15, 7
9	(Chile) Fabiola Márquez	15, 15
24	(Guatemala) Mónica Escobar	3, 2
25	(Costa Rica) Deborah Kessler	2, 0
8	(Japan) Toshiko Sakamoto	15, 15
5	(Mexico) Paola Longoria	15, 15
28	(Catalonia) Raquel Consegal	1, 3
21	(Germany) Andrea Gordon	5, 2
12	(Bolivia) Yazmine Sabja	15, 15
13	(Republic of Ireland) Eithne Skehan	2, 6
20	(Ecuador) Cristina Córdova	15, 15
29	(Colombia) Cristina Amaya	6, 7
4	(Canada) Josée Grand'Maître	15, 15
3	(United States) Cheryl Gudinas	15, 15
30	(Honduras) Ana Fortin	1, 2
19	(Venezuela) Mariana Paredes	12, 8
14	(South Korea) Jung Eun Ane	15, 15
11	(Chile) Angela Grisar	15, 15
22	(Guatemala) Patricia Beltranena	0, 1
27	(Costa Rica) Naomi Sasso	1, 4
6	(Japan) Harumi Kajino	15, 15
7	(Mexico) Susana Acosta	15, 15
26	(Catalonia) Elisabet Consegal	4, 7
23	(Germany) Yvonne Kortes	2, 0
10	(Bolivia) Jenny Daza	15, 15
15	(Republic of Ireland) Ciara Mcmanamon	0, 1
18	(Ecuador) Maria Paz Muñoz	15, 15
31	(Turkey) Ayten Kececi	3, 0
2	(Canada) Jennifer Saunders	15, 15

Second round
1	(United States) Rhonda Rajsich	15, 15
17	(Venezuela) Vivianna Reveron	8, 2
9	(Chile) Fabiola Márquez	2, 9
8	(Japan) Toshiko Sakamoto	15, 15
5	(Mexico) Paola Longoria	15, 15
12	(Bolivia) Yazmine Sabja	14, 10
20	(Ecuador) Cristina Córdova	12, 6
4	(Canada) Josée Grand'Maître	15, 15
3	(United States) Cheryl Gudinas	15, 15
14	(South Korea) Jung Eun Ane	4, 10
11	(Chile) Angela Grisar	15, 15
6	(Japan) Harumi Kajino	6, 12
7	(Mexico) Susana Acosta	10, 15, 11
10	(Bolivia) Jenny Daza	15, 13, 6
18	(Ecuador) Maria Paz Muñoz	14, 13, 6
2	(Canada) Jennifer Saunders	15, 15, 11

Quarterfinals
1	(United States) Rhonda Rajsich	15, 15
8	Toshiko Sakamoto	9, 3
5	(Mexico) Paola Longoria	15, 15
4	(Canada) Josée Grand'Maître	10, 8
3	(United States) Cheryl Gudinas	15, 15
11	(Chile) Angela Grisar	7, 6
7	(Mexico) Susana Acosta	13, 9
2	(Canada) Jennifer Saunders	15, 15

Semifinals
1	(United States) Rhonda Rajsich	15, 15
5	(Mexico) Paola Longoria	10, 9
3	(United States) Cheryl Gudinas	15, 11, 11
2	(Canada) Jennifer Saunders	8, 15, 8

Final
1	(United States) Rhonda Rajsich	15, 15
3	(United States) Cheryl Gudinas	13, 8

Winner

== Men's doubles competition ==
First round
17	(Honduras) Gerardo Fajardo (Honduras) Yelso Molinari	12, 13
16	(India) Nanda Gudderra (India) Sid Harshavat	15, 15
21	(Poland) Jakob Kuzniacki (Poland) Peter Rakowski	2, 6
12	(South Korea) Se Young Joo (South Korea) Song Ha Sin	15, 15
13	(Ecuador) Fernando Rios (Ecuador) Juan Diego Rodriguez	15, 15
20	(Catalonia) Carlos Oviedo (Catalonia) Alberto Serfaty	3, 13
19	(Belgium) Niklaas Deboutte (Belgium) Paul Devos	13, 4
14	(Netherlands) Peter De Jong (Netherlands) Edwin Schipper	15, 15
11	(Dominican Republic) Luis Pérez (Dominican Republic) Leonel Simó	15, 15
22	(Chinese Taipei) Huang-Jung Hsu (Chinese Taipei) Wen-Chang Wen	3, 2
15	(Germany) Joachim Loof (Germany) Trevor Meyer	15, 11, 11
18	(Republic of Ireland) Patrick Hanley (Republic of Ireland) Adam Neary	13, 15, 6

Second round
1	(Mexico) Gilberto Mejia (Mexico) Javier Moreno	15, 15
17	India	4, 1
9	(Guatemala) Juan Luis Galvez (Guatemala) Christian Wer	11, 7
8	(Chile) Pablo Fajre (Chile) Sebastian Roessler	15, 15
5	(Argentina) Fabiean Apa (Argentina) Danny Maggi	15, 15
12	South Korea	3, 8
13	Ecuador	7, 7
4	(Venezuela) César Castro (Venezuela) Jorge Hirsekorn	15, 15
3	(Canada) Kris Odegard (Canada) François Viens	15, 15
14	Netherlands	2, 2
11	Dominican Republic	13, 10
6	(Japan) Michimune Kono (Japan) Hiroshi Shimizu	15, 15
7	(Bolivia) Roland Keller (Bolivia) Ricardo Monroy	12, 15, 11
10	(Costa Rica) Bruno Casalvolone (Costa Rica) Joaquin Solera	15, 14, 6
15	(Germany)	1, 6
2	(United States) Jason Thoerner (United States) Mitch Williams	15, 15

Quarterfinals
1	Mexico	WBF
8	Chile	-
5	Argentina	15, 8, 4
4	Venezuela	7, 15, 11
3	Canada	15, 7, 6
6	Japan	2, 15, 11
10	Bolivia	3, 7
2	(United States) USA	15, 15

Semifinals
1	Mexico	15, 15
4	Venezuela	7, 1
6	(Japan)	4, 2
2	(United States) USA	15, 15

Final
1	Mexico	13, 15, 7
2	(United States) USA	15, 10, 11

Winners

== Women's doubles competition ==
Round of 16
9	(Venezuela) Mariana Paredes (Venezuela) Vivianna Reveron	15, 15
8	(Guatemala) Maria Gomar (Guatemala) Lucy Zachrisson	7, 5
5	(Chile) Angela Grisar (Chile) Fabiola Marquez	15, 15
12	(Germany) Yvonne Kortes (Germany) Lara Ludwig	8, 4
13	(Costa Rica) Deborah Kessler (Costa Rica) Naomi Sasso	1, 6
4	(Japan) Rie Masuyama (Japan) Maiko Sato	15, 15
3	(Mexico) Paola Longoria (Mexico) Rosy Torres	15, 15
14	(Honduras) Maria Aguilar (Honduras) Ana Fortin	3, 3
11	(Republic of Ireland) Clodagh McManamon (Republic of Ireland) Donna Ryder	3, 4
6	(Bolivia) Jenny Daza (Bolivia) Carola Loma	15, 15
7	(South Korea) Yun Mi Bae (South Korea) Nawoo Kim	2, 4
10	(Ecuador) Ivonne Carpio (Ecuador) Maria Paz Muñoz	15, 15

Quarterfinals
1	(United States) Jackie Paraiso (United States) Aimee Ruiz	15, 15
8	Venezuela	3, 5
5	Chile	15, 15
4	(Japan)	3, 3
3	Mexico	15, 15
6	Bolivia	12, 6
10	Ecuador	12, 3
2	(Canada) Genvieve Brodeur (Canada) Véronique Guillemette	15, 15

Semi-finals
1	(United States) USA	15, 15
5	Chile	4, 5
6	Mexico	15, 6, 9
2	Canada	3, 15, 11

Final
1	(United States) USA	15, 15
6	Canada	8, 6

Winners

== See also ==
- Racquetball World Championships
