= 2006 Racquetball World Championships =

- XIII Racquetball World Championships: Dominican Republic 2006 -
Host	Santo Domingo; Dominican Republic
Dates	August 3 - August 13
- Men teams
Champions	United States
Runners-up	Canada
Third place	Mexico
Fourth place	Venezuela
- Women teams
Champions	United States
Runners-up	Canada
Third place	Japan
Fourth place	Venezuela

The 13th Racquetball World Championships were held in Santo Domingo (Dominican Republic) from August 3 to 13, with 22 men's national teams and 18 women's national teams in the national teams competition, and several players in the singles and doubles competition.

== Men's team competition ==
First round
1
32
17	Belgium	0
16	(Republic of Ireland) Ireland	3
9
24
25
8
5
28
21
12
13	South Korea	3
20	Poland	0
29
4
3
30
19	Italy	1
14	Netherlands	2
11
22
27
6
7
26
23
10
15	(Dominican Republic) Dominican R.	2
18	Catalonia	1
31
2

Second round
1	Canada	3
16	(Republic of Ireland) Ireland	0
9	Costa Rica	3
8	Guatemala	0
5	Venezuela	2
12	Germany	1
13	South Korea	2
4	Japan	1
3	Mexico	3
14	Netherlands	0
11	Ecuador	0
6	Bolivia	3
7	Chile	3
10	Puerto Rico	0
15	(Dominican Republic) Dominican R.	0
2	United States	3

Quarterfinals
1	Canada	2
9	Costa Rica	1
5	Venezuela	3
13	South Korea	0
3	Mexico	2
6	Bolivia	1
7	Chile	0
2	United States	3

Semifinals
1	Canada	2
5	Venezuela	1
3	Mexico	0
2	United States	3

Final
1	Canada	0
2	(United States) USA	3

Winners
United States

=== Men's final standings ===
National team
1	United States
2	Canada
3	Mexico
4	Venezuela
5	Bolivia
6	South Korea
7	Costa Rica
8	Chile
9	Ecuador
10	Japan
11	Puerto Rico
12	(Republic of Ireland) Ireland
13	(Dominican Republic) Dominican R.
14	Germany
15	Guatemala
16	Netherlands
17	Catalonia
18	Italy
=	Belgium
=	Poland
21	Switzerland
22	Nicaragua
=	Colombia

== Women's team competition ==
First round
1
32
17	Catalonia	2
16	Netherlands	1
9
24
25
8
5
28
21
12
13
20
29
4
3
30
19
14
11
22
27
6
7
26
23
10
15	Costa Rica	3
18	France	0
31
2

Second round
1	United States	3
17	Catalonia	0
9	Venezuela	3
8	Puerto Rico	0
5	Bolivia	3
12	(Dominican Republic) Dominican R.	0
13	(Republic of Ireland) Ireland	1
4	Mexico	2
3	Chile	2
14	Ecuador	1
11	Germany	0
6	Japan	3
7	South Korea	2
10	Guatemala	1
15	Costa Rica	0
2	Canada	3

Quarterfinals
1	United States	3
9	Venezuela	0
5	Bolivia	0
4	Mexico	3
3	Chile	1
6	Japan	2
7	South Korea	0
2	Canada	3

Semifinals
1	United States	3
4	Mexico	0
6	Japan	0
2	Canada	3

Final
1	(United States) USA	2
2	Canada	1

Winners
United States

=== Women's final standings ===
National team
1	United States
2	Canada
3	Japan
4	Mexico
5	Chile
6	Bolivia
7	South Korea
8	Venezuela
9	Ecuador
10	(Republic of Ireland) Ireland
11	France
12	Costa Rica
13	Germany
14	(Dominican Republic) Dominican R.
15	Guatemala
16	Netherlands
17	Catalonia
18	Puerto Rico

== See also ==
- Racquetball World Championships
