= 2016 in racquetball =

This topic lists the racquetball events for 2016.

== World Championships and Continental Championships ==
- March 19–26: Pan American Championships in (Mexico) San Luis Potosí
  - Men's Singles: (Mexico) Daniel De La Rosa def. (United States) Jake Bredenbeck 15–2, 15–1.
  - Men's Doubles: (Mexico) Javier Moreno / (Mexico) Alejandro Landa def. (Ecuador) Fernando Rios / (Ecuador) Jose Daniel Ugalde 15–11, 15–10.
  - Women's Singles: (Mexico) Paola Longoria def. (Canada) Frédérique Lambert 15–3, 15–6.
  - Women's Doubles: (Mexico) Paola Longoria / (Mexico) Samantha Salas def. (United States) Michelle Key / (United States) Kelani Bailey 15–5, 15–10.
  - Boys' Singles U14: (Mexico) Jose Carlos Ramos Martinez def. (Chile) Ari Wiessbrott 15–1, 15–7.
  - Boys' Singles U16: (Mexico) Rodrigo Rodriguez def. (Mexico) Eduardo Portillo 5–15, 15–7, 11–7.
  - Women's Singles U14: (Mexico) Guadalupe Griffin def. (Mexico) Delia Alejandra Aguilar 15–5, 11–15, 11–8.
  - Women's Doubles U16: (Mexico) Monserrat de la Mejia / (Mexico) Ana Laura Flores def. (Mexico) Delia Alejandra Aguilar / (Mexico) Guadalupe Griffin 15–8, 15–3.
- July 16–23: World Championships in (Colombia) Cali
  - Men's Singles: (United States) Rocky Carson def. (Mexico) Daniel de la Rosa 11–15, 15–5, 11–5.
  - Women's Singles: (Mexico) Paola Longoria def. (Guatemala) Ana Gabriela Martínez 15–12, 15–5.
  - Men's Doubles: (Mexico) Álvaro Beltrán / Javier Moreno def. (United States) Jake Bredenbeck / Jose Diaz 15–12, 15–9.
  - Women's Doubles: (United States) Aimee Ruiz / Janel Tisinger
- August 29 – September 3: Senior World Championships in Albuquerque
  - Overall winners: United States and Mexico
- November 13–19: Junior World Championships n San Luis Potosí
  - Top three: 1. Mexico, 2. Bolivia, 3. United States

== 2016 World Racquetball Tour ==
- February 18 – December 18: 2016 World Racquetball Tour
  - February 18–21: WRT Mt Rainier Open in (Washington (state)) Seattle
    - (Mexico) Alejandro Cardona def. (United States) Jake Bredenbeck 15–3, 15–10.
    - (Mexico) Alejandro Cardona / (Mexico) Gerardo Franco def. (Mexico) Andree Parrilla / (United States) David Horn, 15–9, 10–15, 11–6.
  - April 21 – 24: 2016 WRT Sonora Open in (Mexico) Hermosillo
    - (Mexico) Polo Gutierrez def. (Mexico) Alejandro Cardona, 15–8, 15–10.
  - May 13 – 15: WRT Midwest Championships in (Minnesota) Minneapolis
    - (Mexico) Alejandro Cardona def. (United States) David Horn, 8–15, 15–10, 11–8.
    - (Mexico) Alejandro Cardona / (Mexico) Jaime Martell def. (United States) David Horn / (Colombia) Sebastian Franco, 11–15, 15–12, 11–5.
  - June 15 – 18: Long Beach Open in (California) Long Beach
    - (Mexico) Rodrigo Montoya / (Costa Rica) Teobaldo Fumero A. def. (Bolivia) Carlos Keller Vargas / (Bolivia) Roland Keller, 15–5, 15–13.
  - August 18 – 21: San Luis Open in (Mexico) San Luis Potosí
    - Winner: (Mexico) Javier Mar
    - Doubles winners: (Mexico) Andree Parrilla & (Mexico) Rodrigo Montoya
  - September 15 – 18: Atlanta Open in (Georgia (U.S. state)) Atlanta
    - Singles: (Mexico) Andree Parrilla defeated (Mexico) Polo Gutierrez, 15–11, 15–14.
    - Doubles: (Mexico) Andree Parrilla & (United States) David Horn defeated (United States) Justus Benson & (Mexico) Jaime Martell, 15-15, 15–3, 11–6.
  - October 28 – 30: Del Lago Open in (Mexico) Matamoros
    - (Mexico) Jaime Martell defeated (United States) David Horn 12–15, 15–12, 11–6.
    - (Mexico) Jaime Martell & (United States) David defeated (Mexico) Alejandro Cardona & (Mexico) Rodrigo Montoya, from windrawn.
  - December 2 – 4: Monterrey Open in (Mexico) Monterrey
    - Singles: (Mexico) Edson Martinez defeated (Mexico) Javier Mar, 11–6, 11–5, 11–1.
  - December 8 – 11: Alamo City Open in (Texas) San Antonio
    - Singles: (United States) Alejandro Landa defeated (United States) Alejandro Cardona, 15–6, 15–10.
    - Doubles: (United States) Alejandro Landa & (United States) Felipe Camacho defeated (Mexico) Andree Parrilla & (Mexico) Rodrigo Montoya, 12–15, 15–13, 11–4.

== 2015–16 International Racquetball Tour ==
- July 10, 2015 – August 14, 2016: 2015–16 International Racquetball Tour
  - September 17–20: Novasors Ghost of Georgetown Kansas City Open in Kansas City
    - (Canada) Kane Waselenchuk def. (United States) Rocky Carson 11–5, 11–0, 11–13, 11–2
  - October 7 – 11: UnitedHealthcare US OPEN Racquetball Championships in (Minnesota) Minneapolis
    - (Canada) Kane Waselenchuk def. (Mexico) Daniel De La Rosa 11–5, 11–8, 11–3 to win his 11th UnitedHealthCare US Open Title.
    - (United States) Ben Croft / (Canada) Kane Waselenchuk def. (United States) Jake Bredenbeck / (United States) Jose Diaz 15–0, 15–5.
  - October 22–25: Krowning Moment & Bobcat Open in (Texas) San Marcos
    - (Canada) Kane Waselenchuk def. (United States) Rocky Carson 11–6, 11–3, 11–2.
  - October 29 – November 1: Galaxy Custom Printing IRT Pro/Am in (Georgia (U.S. state)) Lilburn
    - (Mexico) Álvaro Beltrán def. (United States) Rocky Carson 11–8, 8–11, 11–5, 11–4.
  - November 5–8: Red Swain Shootout in (Michigan) Davison
    - (United States) Rocky Carson def. (United States) Jose Rojas 11–2, 11–2, 11–8
  - November 12–15: 25th Annual Turkey Shootout in (Kansas) Garden City
    - (Canada) Kane Waselenchuk def. (United States) Rocky Carson 11–3, 11–3, 11–8.
  - November 19–22: St. Louis Pro Racquetball Winter Rollout in (Missouri) St. Louis
    - (Canada) Kane Waselenchuk def. (United States) Rocky Carson 11–2, 11–5, 11–2.
  - January 14–17: NYC Open 17th Annual IRT Pro Stop in (New York (state)) Long Island
    - (Canada) Kane Waselenchuk def. (United States) Rocky Carson 11–7, 11–5, 11–2.
  - January 21–24: Lewis Drug Pro/Am in (South Dakota) Sioux Falls
    - (Canada) Kane Waselenchuk def. (United States) Jose Rojas 12–10, 11–1, 11–6.
    - (Mexico) Álvaro Beltrán / (United States) Rocky Carson def. (Colombia) Felipe Camacho / (Mexico) Daniel De La Rosa 15–7, 15–3.
  - March 10 – 13: Shamrock Shootout Pro/AM in (Illinois) Lombard
    - (Canada) Kane Waselenchuk def. (Mexico) Daniel De La Rosa 11–2, 11–4, 11–2.
  - March 31 – April 3: 2016 Raising Some Racquet for Kids in (Ohio) Huber Heights
    - (United States) Rocky Carson def. (Mexico) Álvaro Beltrán 11–7, 9–11, 11–6, 8–11, 11–9.
  - April 28 - May 1: Florida IRT Pro/Am in Sarasota
    - (United States) Rocky Carson def. (Mexico) Daniel De La Rosa 5–11, 7–11, 11–8, 11–4, 11–1.
  - May 12 – 15: ProKennex Tournament of Champions in (Oregon) Portland
    - (Canada) Kane Waselenchuk def. (Mexico) Daniel De La Rosa 5–11, 11–9, 11–3, 11–3.
  - May 19 – 22: Coast to Coast California IRT Open in Reseda (final)
    - (Canada) Kane Waselenchuk def. (Mexico) Daniel De La Rosa 11–4, 11–2, 11–0.

== 2015–16 Ladies Professional Racquetball Tour ==
- August 28, 2015 – May 15, 2016: 2015–16 Ladies Professional Racquetball Tour
  - August 28–30: Cali Open in (Colombia) Cali
    - (Mexico) Paola Longoria def. (Argentina) Maria Jose Vargas 11–13, 11–2, 11–6, 11–3.
    - (Mexico) Paola Longoria / (Mexico) Samantha Salas def. (United States) Michelle Key / (Canada) Frédérique Lambert 10–15, 15–0, 11–5.
  - September 24–27: 3 Wall Ball World Championships in (Nevada) Las Vegas
    - (Mexico) Paola Longoria def. (United States) Janel Tisinger 15–11, 15–12, 11–6.
    - (Mexico) Paola Longoria / (United States) Michelle Key def. (United States) Aimee Ruiz / (United States) Janel Tisinger 15–11, 15–10.
  - October 7–11: UnitedHealthcare US OPEN Racquetball Championships in (Minnesota) Minneapolis
    - (Mexico) Paola Longoria def. (United States) Rhonda Rajsich 11–7, 11–5, 9–11, 11–9.
    - (Mexico) Paola Longoria / (Mexico) Samantha Salas def. (Mexico) Alejandra Herrera / (Mexico) Monserrat Mejia 15–10, 15–2.
  - October 30 – November 1: 2015 Paola Longoria Experience in (Mexico) San Luis Potosí City
    - (Mexico) Paola Longoria def. (Argentina) Maria Jose Vargas 11–0, 11–1, 11–5.
    - (Mexico) Paola Longoria / (Mexico) Samantha Salas def. (Mexico) Susana Acosta / (Mexico) Jessica Parrilla 15–7, 15–5
  - November 13–15: 2015 Paola Longoria Invitational in (Mexico) Monterrey
    - (Mexico) Paola Longoria def. (United States) Rhonda Rajsich 9–11, 11–8, 11–1, 11–2.
    - (United States) Sheryl Lotts / (United States) Rhonda Rajsich def. (United States) Michelle Key / (Canada) Frédérique Lambert 15–11, 15–14.
  - December 11–13: 24th Annual NES Associates Christmas Pro Am in (Virginia) Arlington County
    - (Mexico) Paola Longoria def. (Argentina) Maria Jose Vargas 11–1, 11–1, 11–0.
    - (Mexico) Alejandra Herrera / (Mexico) Paola Longoria def. (Mexico) Susana Acosta / (Mexico) Samantha Salas 15–8, 15–13.
  - January 29–31: Mercedes-Benz of Cincinnati Pro Am in (Ohio) Cincinnati
    - (Mexico) Paola Longoria def. (United States) Rhonda Rajsich 11–3, 11–8, 11–4.
    - (Mexico) Paola Longoria / (Mexico) Samantha Salas def. (United States) Michelle Key / (Canada) Frédérique Lambert 15–3, 15–3.
  - February 19–21: Winter Classic in (Kansas) Overland Park
    - (Mexico) Paola Longoria def. (Canada) Frédérique Lambert 11–2, 11–2, 11–4.
    - (Canada) Frédérique Lambert / (Mexico) Sofia Rascon def. (Mexico) Alejandra Herrera / (Mexico) Monserrat Mejia 15–13, 15–4.
  - March 4–6: New Jersey Open in Warren Township
    - (Mexico) Paola Longoria def. (United States) Rhonda Rajsich 11–6, 7–11, 11–4, 11–2.
    - (Canada) Frédérique Lambert / (Mexico) Paola Longoria def. (United States) Aimee Ruiz / (Argentina) Maria Jose Vargas 15–12, 13–15, 11–4.
  - April 1–3: AZ WOR VII Final Battle in (Arizona) Glendale
    - Round Robin: 1. (United States) Rhonda Rajsich, 2. (United States) Michelle Key, 3. (United States) Adrianna Moncada, 4. (United States) Susie Boulanger
  - April 22–24: Battle at the Alamo in (Texas) San Antonio
    - Men's Singles: (Mexico) Daniel de la Rosa def. (United States) Jansen Allen 11–3, 11–8, 1–11, 11–9.
    - Women's Singles: (Mexico) Paola Longoria def. (Argentina) Maria Jose Vargas 11–8, 11–5, 11–6.
    - Women's Doubles: (Mexico) Paola Longoria / (Mexico) Samantha Salas def. (Mexico) Jessica Parrilla / (United States) Rhonda Rajsich 15–4, 15–6.
  - May 12 – 15: Dare 2 Dream Racquetball Championships in (California) Stockton
    - (Mexico) Paola Longoria def. (United States) Rhonda Rajsich 11–5, 9–11, 10–11, 11–3, 11–1.
  - June 7 – 11: Formulaflow Pro Am in (Bolivia) Cochabamba
  - June 10 – 12: Tour Rosa Mexicano in (Mexico) Veracruz (final)
    - Women's Singles: (Mexico) Paola Longoria def. (Canada) Frédérique Lambert 6–11, 11–6, 3–11, 11–9, 11–2.
    - Women's Doubles: (Mexico) Paola Longoria / (Mexico) Samantha Salas def. (Canada) Frédérique Lambert / (Guatemala) María Renée Rodríguez 15–5, 10–15, 11–8.
