= 2018 in racquetball =

This topic lists the racquetball events for 2018.

== World and Continental Events ==
- March 23 – 31: 2018 Pan American Racquetball Championships in (Chile) Temuco
  - Men's Singles: (Bolivia) Carlos Keller Vargas defeated (United States) David Horn, 15–12, 5–15, 11–7.
  - Women's Singles: (United States) Rhonda Rajsich defeated (Mexico) Paola Longoria, 15–3, 14–15, 11–7.
  - Men's Doubles: (Mexico) Rodrigo Montoya & (Mexico) Álvaro Beltrán defeated (Bolivia) Conrado Moscoso & (Bolivia) Carlos Keller Vargas, 13–15, 15–10, 11–6.
  - Women's Doubles: (Mexico) Paola Longoria & (Mexico) Alexandra Herrera defeated (Guatemala) Ana Gabriela Martínez & (Guatemala) María Renee Rodriguez, 9–15, 15–1, 11–8.

== International Racquetball Tour ==
September 7, 2017 –: International Racquetball Tour

- September 7 – 10: 2017 Phase IV Scientific Health & Performance Pro Am in (California) Canoga Park
  - Singles: (Canada) Kane Waselenchuk defeated (United States) Rocky Carson, 11-0, 11-2, 11-4.
  - Doubles: (United States) Ben Croft & (Canada) Kane Waselenchuk defeated (Mexico) Álvaro Beltrán & (Mexico) Daniel de la Rosa, 15-5, 15-13.
  - Futures: (Mexico) Andree Parrilla defeated (United States) David Horn, 11-6, 11-6, 11-9.
- October 4 – 8, 2017: US Open Racquetball Championships in (Minnesota) Minneapolis
  - Singles: (Canada) Kane Waselenchuk defeated (United States) Rocky Carson, 11-6, 11-4, 8-11, 11-4.
  - Doubles: (United States) Ben Croft & (Canada) Kane Waselenchuk defeated (Mexico) Álvaro Beltrán & (Mexico) Daniel de la Rosa, 15-10, 10-15, 11-7.
- November 2 – 5, 2017: Creatix – Atlanta IRT Pro Am in (Georgia (U.S. state)) Atlanta
  - Singles: (Canada) Kane Waselenchuk defeated (United States) Rocky Carson. Rocky Carson retired due injury.
  - Doubles: (Mexico) Álvaro Beltrán & (Mexico) Daniel de la Rosa defeated (United States) Jake Bredenbeck & (United States) Jose Diaz, 15-8, 15-2.
- November 16 – 19, 2017: St. Louis IRT Pro Racquetball Winter Rollout in (Missouri) Saint Louis
  - Singles: (Canada) Kane Waselenchuk defeated (United States) Rocky Carson, 11-1, 11-3, 11-4.
  - Doubles Futures: (United States) Jake Bredenbeck & (United States) David Horn defeated (United States) Felipe Camacho & (Canada) Samuel Murray, 12-15, 15-8, 11-8.
- November 30 – December 3, 2017: Portland Tournament of Champions (Oregon) Portland
  - Singles: (United States) Charles Pratt defeated (Colombia) Mario Mercado. Mario Mercado retired due injury.
  - Doubles Futures: (United States) Felipe Camacho & (Canada) Samuel Murray defeated (United States) Adam Manilla & (United States) Nicholas Riffel, 15-4, 15-7.
- January 5 – 7: 2018 IRT Los Angeles Open in (California) Canoga Park
  - Singles: (Mexico) Daniel de la Rosa defeated (Canada) Kane Waselenchuk. Kane Waselenchuk forfeits due to an injury picked up in the semi-finals.
  - Doubles: (United States) Alejandro Landa & (Canada) Samuel Murray defeated (United States) Jake Bredenbeck & (United States) Jose Diaz, 15-14, 14-15, 11-9.
- January 18 – 21: Lewis Drug Pro/Am in Sioux Falls, South Dakota
  - Singles: (United States) Alejandro Landa defeated (Mexico) Daniel de la Rosa, 15-6, 7-15, 11-10.
  - Singles IRT Futures: (Colombia) Sebastian Franco defeated (Mexico) Alejandro Cardona, 9-15, 15-13, 11-9.
  - Doubles: (Mexico) Javier Mar & (Mexico) Rodrigo Montoya defeated (United States) Jake Bredenbeck & (United States) Jose Diaz, 15-13, 15-12.
  - Doubles IRT Futures: (Mexico) Eduardo Portillo & (Mexico) Sebastian Fernandez defeated (Canada) Tim Landeryou & (Canada) James Landeryou, 15-11, 10-15, 11-7.
- March 1 – 4: San Antonio March Madness in (Texas) San Antonio
  - Singles: (United States) Tyler Panozzo defeated (United States) Thirumurugan Thyagarajan, 12-15, 15-4, 11-6.
  - Doubles IRT Futures: (United States) Jose Diaz & (Canada) Samuel Murray defeated (United States) Felipe Camacho & (United States) Alejandro Landa, WBF - No Show.
- March 15 – 18: The 33rd Annual Shamrock Shootout and IRT Pro Stop in (Illinois) Chicago
  - Singles: (Mexico) Andree Parrilla defeated (United States) David Horn, 15-1, 15-9.
  - Doubles: (Colombia) Sebastian Franco & (Colombia) Mario Mercado defeated (Mexico) Alejandro Landa & (Canada) Samuel Murray, WBF - No Show.
- April 5 – 8: Mercedes-Benz of Ft. Mitchell Raising Some Racquet For Kids in (Ohio) Cincinnati
  - Singles: (Mexico) Alejandro Landa defeated (Mexico) Álvaro Beltrán, 11-15, 15-7, 11-8.
- April 26 – 29: Florida IRT Regional Championships in Sarasota
  - Singles: (Canada) Kane Waselenchuk defeated (United States) Rocky Carson, 15-5, 15-4.
- May 2 – 6: World Doubles Open Championships in (Colorado) Denver (final)
  - Men's Doubles: (United States) Ben Croft & (Canada) Kane Waselenchuk defeated (Mexico) Álvaro Beltrán & (Mexico) Daniel de la Rosa, WBF - Injury.
  - Mixed Doubles: (Mexico) Daniel De La Rosa & (Mexico) Michelle De La Rosa defeated (Mexico) Adriana Riveros & (Mexico) Mario Mercado, 15-7, 15-13.

== Ladies Professional Racquetball Tour ==
- August 18, 2017 – May 27: 2017–18 Ladies Professional Racquetball Tour
- August 18 – 20, 2017: Paola Longoria Experience in (Mexico) San Luis Potosí City
  - Singles: (Mexico) Paola Longoria defeated (Mexico) Jessica Parrilla, 11-7, 11-5, 11-0.
  - Doubles: (Mexico) Paola Longoria & (Mexico) Monserrat Mejía defeated (Colombia) Adriana Riveros & (Colombia) Cristina Amaya, 15-8, 15-14.
- August 23 – 27, 2017: Torneo Milenio LPRT 2017 Racquetbol in (Mexico) Tijuana
  - Singles: (Mexico) Paola Longoria defeated (Mexico) Alexandra Herrera, 11-4, 11-3, 11-0.
  - Doubles: (Mexico) Alexandra Herrera & (Argentina) Natalia Méndez defeated (United States) Carla Muñoz & (Mexico) Jessica Parrilla, 10-15, 15-15, 11-10.
- September 21 – 24, 2017: 3Wallball World Championships in (Nevada) Las Vegas
  - Singles: (United States) Janel Tisinger defeated (United States) Rhonda Rajsich, 11-15, 15-10, 11-8.
  - Doubles: (United States) Aimee Ruiz & (United States) Janel Tisinger defeated (United States) Michelle Poage & (United States) Jackie Paraiso, 15-11, 15-9.
- October 4 – 8, 2017: US Open Racquetball Championships in (Minnesota) Minneapolis
  - Singles: (Mexico) Paola Longoria defeated (Canada) Frédérique Lambert, 11-7, 11-4, 2-11, 11-3.
  - Doubles: (Guatemala) Gabriela Martínez & (Mexico) Paola Longoria defeated (Colombia) Adriana Riveros & (Colombia) Cristina Amaya, 15-5, 15-8.
- October 27 – 29: The Boston Open in (Massachusetts) Boston
  - Singles: (Mexico) Paola Longoria defeated (Canada) Frédérique Lambert. Frédérique Lambert retired due injury.
  - Doubles: (Mexico) Alexandra Herrera & (Mexico) Paola Longoria defeated (Colombia) Adriana Riveros & (Colombia) Cristina Amaya, 15-5, 15-9.
- December 8 – 10: The Christmas Classic in (Maryland) Laurel
  - Singles: (Mexico) Paola Longoria defeated (Canada) Frédérique Lambert, 11-2, 11-0, 9-11, 11-2.
  - Doubles: (Mexico) Alexandra Herrera & (Mexico) Paola Longoria defeated (Canada) Frédérique Lambert & (Mexico) Jessica Parrilla, 15-13, 15-6.
- January 26 – 28: Sweet Caroline Open in Greenville, South Carolina
  - Singles: (Mexico) Paola Longoria defeated (Mexico) Nancy Enríquez, 11-9, 11-7, 11-0.
  - Doubles: (Mexico) Alexandra Herrera & (Mexico) Paola Longoria defeated (Canada) Frédérique Lambert & (Mexico) Samantha Salas, 15-13, 15-5.
  - Mixed Pro: (United States) Jordan Walters & (Chile) Carla Muñoz defeated (United States) Sheryl Lotts & (United States) Shane Karmelin, 15-13, 14-15, 11-3.
- March 9 – 11: 2018 LPRT Peachtree Open in (Georgia (U.S. state)) Atlanta
  - Singles: (Argentina) María José Vargas defeated (Canada) Frédérique Lambert, WBF - No Show.
  - Doubles: (Colombia) Adriana Riveros & (Colombia) Cristina Amaya defeated (Argentina) María José Vargas & (Argentina) Natalia Mendez, 12-15, 15-9, 11-9.
  - Mixed Pro: (United States) Rhonda Rajsich & (United States) Ben Croft defeated (United States) Sharon Jackson & (United States) Allan Crockett, 10-15, 15-9, 11-2.
- March 23 – 26: New York Life Insurance Beach Bash in (Florida) Hollywood Beach
  - Women's Singles One Wall: (Washington (state)) Hollie Scott defeated (Florida) Michelle Herbert, 21-6.
  - Women's Doubles One Wall: (Florida) Michelle Herbert & (Washington (state)) Hollie Scott defeated (New York (state)) Susan Stephen & (New York (state)) Melissa Santiago. Match not played.
- April 20 – 22: Battle At The Alamo in (Texas) San Antonio
  - Men's Singles: (Mexico) Daniel De La Rosa defeated (Mexico) Andree Parrilla, 15-14, 15-12.
  - Women's Singles: (Mexico) Samantha Salas defeated (Mexico) Paola Longoria, 5-11, 5-11, 11-9, 11-9, 11-4.
  - Women's Doubles: (Mexico) Paola Longoria & (Mexico) Samantha Salas defeated (Mexico) Alexandra Herrera & (Mexico) Monserrat Mejia, 15-6, 15-2.
- May 4 – 6: World Open Doubles Championships in (Colorado) Denver
  - Women's Doubles: (Mexico) Paola Longoria & (Mexico) Samantha Salas defeated (Mexico) Alexandra Herrera & (Mexico) Monserrat Mejia, 15-5, 5-15, 11-6.
- May 23 – 27: US National Singles in (California) Pleasanton
  - Women's Singles: (United States) Rhonda Rajsich defeated (United States) Kelani Bailey, 15-9, 15-7.
- June 8 – 10: The Teamroot.com Classic in (Kansas) Overland Park (final)
  - Singles: (Mexico) Paola Longoria defeated (Canada) Frédérique Lambert, 11-6, 6-11, 11-4, 11-2.
  - Doubles: (Mexico) Paola Longoria & (Mexico) Samantha Salas defeated (Argentina) María José Vargas & (Argentina) Natalia Mendez, 15-13, 15-6.
