= 2019 in racquetball =

This topic lists the racquetball events for 2019.

== 2019 World Racquetball Competitions ==
- April 12 – 20: XXXII Pan American Championships in (Colombia) Barranquilla
- September 5 – 7: 2019 European Racquetball Championships in (Germany) Hamburg
- November 9 – 16: XXI Junior World Championships in (Costa Rica) San José
- November 29 & 30: Asia Open Championships in TBD place

== 2018–19 International Racquetball Tour ==
- September 13 – 16, 2018: MWRA Season Opener-IRT Pro/Am in (Maryland) Laurel
  - Singles: (United States) Rocky Carson defeated (Canada) Samuel Murray, 15-7, 15-12.
- October 3 – 7, 2018: US Open Racquetball Championships in (Minnesota) Minneapolis
  - Singles: (Canada) Kane Waselenchuk defeated (Mexico) Daniel de la Rosa, 15-11, 15-6.
  - Doubles: (Mexico) Álvaro Beltrán & (Mexico) Daniel de la Rosa defeated (United States) Ben Croft & (Canada) Kane Waselenchuk, 15-11, 15-6.
- November 29 – December 2, 2018: Pelham Memorial Tournament of Champions in (Oregon) Portland
  - Singles: (Canada) Kane Waselenchuk defeated (Mexico) Álvaro Beltrán, 15-6, 15-12.
- January 3 – 6: 2019 California Open in Canoga Park
  - Singles: (Canada) Kane Waselenchuk defeated (Mexico) Daniel de la Rosa, 15-8, 15-10.
  - Doubles: (Mexico) Álvaro Beltrán & (Mexico) Daniel de la Rosa defeated (Mexico) Alejandro Landa & (Canada) Samuel Murray, 15-11, 15-8.
- January 17 – 20: Lewis Drug Pro/Am in (South Dakota) Sioux Falls
  - Singles: (Canada) Kane Waselenchuk defeated (Mexico) Daniel de la Rosa, 15-4, 15-2.
  - Doubles: (Mexico) Rodrigo Montoya & (Mexico) Andree Parrilla defeated (Mexico) Alejandro Landa & (Canada) Samuel Murray, 15-11, 15-11.
- March 14 – 17: 34th Annual Shamrock Shootout and IRT Pro Stop in (Illinois) Lombard
  - Singles: (Canada) Kane Waselenchuk defeated (United States) Rocky Carson, 15-10, 15-10.
  - Doubles: (United States) Ben Croft & (Canada) Kane Waselenchuk defeated (Mexico) Álvaro Beltrán & (Mexico) Daniel de la Rosa, 11-15, 15-9, 11-5.
- March 27 – 31: Bolivia American Iris Open in Cochabamba

== 2018–19 Ladies Professional Racquetball Tour ==
- August 24 – 26, 2018: Paola Longoria Experience in (Mexico) San Luis Potosí City
  - Singles: (Mexico) Paola Longoria defeated (Mexico) Samantha Salas, 11-7, 11-1, 11-3.
  - Doubles: (Mexico) Samantha Salas & (Mexico) Paola Longoria defeated (Mexico) Alexandra Herrera & (Mexico) Monserrat Mejia, 15-10, 15-9.
- September 26 – 30, 2018: World 3-WallBall Championships in (Nevada) Las Vegas
  - Singles Round Robin: 1st. (United States) Janel Tisinger, 2nd. (United States) Rhonda Rajsich, 3rd. (Argentina) María José Vargas, 4th. (Argentina) Natalia Mendez
  - Doubles Round Robin: 1st. (United States) Michelle Herbert & (United States) Rhonda Rajsich, 2nd. (Chile) Carla Muñoz & (Mexico) Michelle Key, 3rd. (United States) Jackie Paraiso & (United States) Janel Tisinger, 4th. (Argentina) Natalia Mendez & (Argentina) María José Vargas
  - Mixed Doubles: (United States) Rhonda Rajsich & (United States) Rick Soda Man Koll defeated (Mexico) Michelle Key & (Mexico) Daniel de la Rosa, 12-12, 15-12, 11-8.
- October 3 – 7, 2018: US Open Racquetball Championships in (Minnesota) Minneapolis
  - Singles: (Mexico) Paola Longoria defeated (Mexico) Samantha Salas, 11-9, 11-2, 11-5.
  - Doubles: (Mexico) Samantha Salas & (Mexico) Paola Longoria defeated (Mexico) Montserrat Mejia & (Mexico) Alexandra Herrera, 15-11, 15-14.
- October 26 – 28, 2018: 2018 Boston Open in (Massachusetts) Peabody
  - Singles: (Mexico) Paola Longoria defeated (Mexico) Samantha Salas, 11-8, 11-6, 11-6.
  - Doubles: (Mexico) Samantha Salas & (Mexico) Paola Longoria defeated (Guatemala) María Reneé Rodríguez & (Mexico) Alexandra Herrera, 15-7, 15-2.
- November 16 – 18, 2018: Glass Court Turkey Shoot in (Illinois) Lombard
  - Singles: (Mexico) Paola Longoria defeated (Mexico) Samantha Salas, 10-12, 11-3, 11-4, 11-7.
  - Doubles: (Mexico) Samantha Salas & (Mexico) Paola Longoria defeated (Mexico) Alexandra Herrera & (United States) Carla Muñoz, 15-2, 15-9.
- December 14 – 16, 2018: 27th Annual LPRT Christmas Classic Pro-AM in (Maryland) Laurel
  - Singles: (Mexico) Paola Longoria defeated (Mexico) Alexandra Herrera, 11-8, 11-4, 11-7.
  - Doubles: (Mexico) Paola Longoria & (United States) Kelani Bailey Lawrence defeated (Mexico) Alexandra Herrera & (Canada) Frédérique Lambert, 15-7, 15-10.
- January 25 – 27: 2019 Sweet Caroline Open LPRT in (South Carolina) Greenville
  - Singles: (Mexico) Paola Longoria defeated (Mexico) Samantha Salas, 11-1, 11-2, 11-6.
  - Doubles: (Mexico) Paola Longoria & (Mexico) Samantha Salas defeated (Argentina) María José Vargas & (Argentina) Natalia Méndez, 15-5, 15-6.
- March 27 – 31: Bolivia American Iris Open in Cochabamba

== 2018–19 European Racquetball Tour ==
- October 13 & 14, 2018: 2018 Hamburg Open in (Germany) Hamburg
  - Men's Singles: (Germany) Oliver Bertels defeated (Germany) Marcel Czempisz, 15-11, 15-13.
  - Women's Singles: Round Robin: 1. (Germany) Yvonne Mesecke, 2. (Netherlands) Maaike Weerdesteijn, 3. (Germany) Renate Hartmann
  - Men's Doubles: (Mexico) Agustín Rodríguez Inclán & (Mexico) Jose Felix defeated (Germany) Marcel Czempisz & (Germany) Oliver Bertels, 15-6, 9-15, 11-4.
- October 20 & 21: 2018 Kilkenny Irish Open in (Republic of Ireland) Kilkenny
  - Men's Singles: (Republic of Ireland) Mark Murphy defeated (Republic of Ireland) Noel O'Callaghan, 2–1.
  - Women's Singles: (Republic of Ireland) Aisling Hickey defeated (Republic of Ireland) Donna Ryder, 2–1.
  - Men's Doubles: (Republic of Ireland) Mark Murphy & (Republic of Ireland) Ben Carey defeated (Republic of Ireland) Padraic Ryder & (Republic of Ireland) Ken Cottrell, 2–0.
- March 15 – 17: Dutch Open 2019 in (Netherlands) The Hague
  - Men's Singles: (Germany) Marcel Czempisz
  - Men's Doubles: (Germany) Marcel Czempisz & (Germany) Arne Schmitz defeated (Netherlands) Pascal Matla & (Netherlands) Edwin Schipper, 11–7, in the Tie-Break.
  - Women's Singles: (Netherlands) Maaike Weerdesteijn defeated (Germany) Renate Lietz, 2–0.
