= Jack Huczek =

American racquetball player

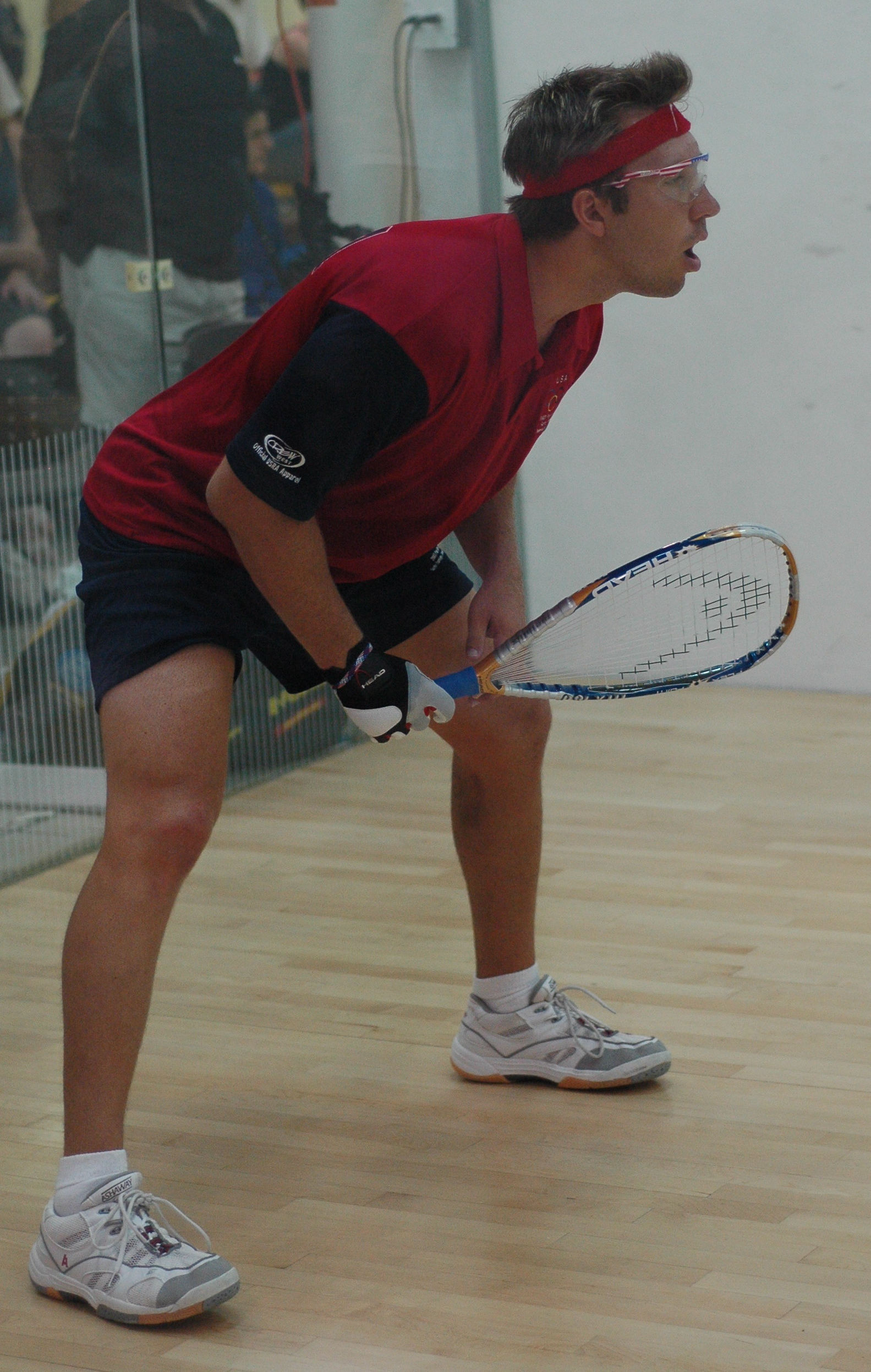
- Huczek at 2006 Worlds

Personal information
- Born: January 13, 1983 (age 43) Michigan, United States
- Height: 1.83 m (6 ft 0 in)
- Weight: 175 lb (79 kg)

Sport
- Sport: Racquetball
- Turned pro: 2000
- Retired: May 24, 2011

Achievements and titles
- National finals: 1st Men's Singles: 2001, 2004, 2005, 2009; 1st Men's Doubles: 2004, 2006, 2008, 2009, 2011
- Highest world ranking: No. 1
Medal record
Men's racquetball
Representing United States
Event	1st	2nd	3rd
Pan American Games	1	0	0
World Championships	7	4	0
World Games	1	0	0
Pan American Championships	2	0	1
Total	11	4	1
World Championships
Gold medal – first place	2002 San Juan	Singles
Silver medal – second place	2002 San Juan	Team
Gold medal – first place	2004 Anyang	Singles
Gold medal – first place	2004 Anyang	Team
Gold medal – first place	2006 Santo Domingo	Singles
Silver medal – second place	2006 Santo Domingo	Doubles
Gold medal – first place	2006 Santo Domingo	Team
Silver medal – second place	2008 Kingscourt	Singles
Gold medal – first place	2008 Kingscourt	Team
Silver medal – second place	2010 Seoul	Singles
Gold medal – first place	2010 Seoul	Team
Pan American Games
Gold medal – first place	2003 Santo Domingo	Singles
World Games
Gold medal – first place	2009 Kaohsiung	Singles
Pan American Championships
Gold medal – first place	2003 Santo Domingo	Singles
Gold medal – first place	2005 Caracas	Singles
Bronze medal – third place	2002 Cochabamba	Singles

Jack Huczek (born January 13, 1983) is a retired American racquetball player. Huczek was a 3 time International Racquetball Federation (IRF) World Champion in Men's Singles, and he was the #1 International Racquetball Tour (IRT) player at the end of the 2006–2007 season. Huczek announced his retirement on May 24, 2011. Huczek was named to USA Racquetball Hall of Fame in 2024.

== Junior years ==
Huczek played a lot of racquetball as a junior, and his record as a junior player is unparalleled. He was USA Racquetball (USAR) Junior Champion twelve consecutive years, winning 13 titles in that period. Huczek's streak began in 1991, when he won Boy's U8 for the first time. Huczek then won U10 twice, followed by two titles in U12 in 1995 and 1996, two in U14 in 1997 and 1998, two in U16 in 1999 and 2000, and three in U18: 2000, 2001, 2002 – U18.

Across that period, Huczek was also a champion in Boys' Doubles. He won U10 Doubles with Andrew Mead in 1993. He won U12 Doubles in 1995 with Matthew McElhiney and in 1996 with Cory Martin. Huczek and Shane Vanderson won Boys' Doubles U16 in 1998. And in 2002 – his final year of juniors – Huczek and Travis Woodbury won U18 Doubles

Astonishingly, Huczek also won 10 junior titles in 10 consecutive years at the International Racquetball Federation (IRF) World Junior Championships. It began with Boy's U10 Singles in 1993 and continued through 2002, when he won his last World Junior title in Boy's U18 Singles.

Huczek won five Boys' Doubles titles at World Juniors. He and Matthew McElhiney won Boy's U12 in 1995. Huczek and Bart Crawford won Boy's U14 Doubles in 1998, and they won U16 Doubles in 1999. Huczek won Boy's U18 Doubles twice: in 2001 with Zack Miller and in 2002 with David Chirban.

Huczek won three USA Racquetball Intercollegiate Championship titles representing Oakland University. He won in 2002, 2003 and 2004.

As a 17-year-old, Huczek reached the semi-finals of the 2000 USA Racquetball National Singles Championship, losing to eventual winner Rocky Carson, 15–11, 15–6.

== 2001 – Career begins ==
Huczek won the USAR National Singles Championships for the first time in 2001, when he defeated Rocky Carson in the final, 15–11, 15–6. Huczek reached the final by defeating Mike Guidry in the semi-finals, 15–5, 15–6.

At the 2001 USAR National Doubles Championships, Huczek played with Eric Muller, and they lost in the quarterfinals to Dan Llacera and Brian Pointelin, 15–13, 7–15, 11–6.

Huczek began playing the International Racquetball Tour (IRT) full time in the 2001–02 season, and as in his junior years, Huczek was successful from the start. He won his first tournament in his first season in January 2002 in Boston, where Huczek defeated Cliff Swain in the final, 11–4, 6–11, 11–8, 12–10. In the semi-finals, he beat John Ellis, 8–11, 11–4, 6–11, 11–3, 11–8, and Jason Mannino in the quarterfinals, 11–5, 10–12, 5–11, 11–7, 11–5. He was also in the final of the next event in Coral Springs, Florida, where he lost to Mannino, 11–5, 11–8, 11–6. Overall, Huczek finished his first full IRT season ranked 5th.

He was the defending champion going into the 2002 USAR National Singles Championship. As defending champion, Huczek was seeded #1, and in the semi-finals beat Michael Bronfeld, 15–2, 15–9, to reach the final for the second consecutive year. However, Huczek lost the final to Mike Guidry, 15–10, 12–15, 11–9.

In 2002, Huczek again partnered with Eric Muller at the USAR National Doubles Championships, and they reached the finals before losing to Ruben Gonzalez and Mike Guidry, 15–7, 15–10. They defeated Jason Thoerner and Mitch Williams in the semi-finals, 15–6, 9–15, 11–4.

In the 2002–03 IRT season, Huczek was in four finals, winning the final event of the season: Pro Nationals in Tempe, Arizona, where he beat Álvaro Beltrán, 11–4, 11–6, 11–8, in the final after defeating Rocky Carson in the semis, 11–1, 11–6, 11–7, and Cliff Swain in the quarters, 11–6, 15–13, 9–11, 11–9. Huczek finished ranked 4th at the end of the season.

In 2003, Huczek reached the finals of the USA National Singles Championships for the 3rd consecutive year. He won the first game of the final against Rocky Carson, but Carson came back to narrowly win the match in three games, including 11–10 in the tie-breaker, making the final score line, 6–15, 15–12, 11–10.

Huczek played on Team USA for the 2003 Pan American Games in Santo Domingo, Dominican Republic. He competed in Men's Singles, and won gold by defeating Canadian Mike Green in the final, 15–12, 15–7. In the semi-finals, Huczek played team-mate Rocky Carson, and as at Nationals that year, they went to a tie-breaker with Huczek coming out on top, 11–15, 15–12, 11–6. The two Americans were on the same side of the draw, as Carson lost one of his preliminary round matches to Green, 15–14, 10–15, 11–9.

Huczek played with a new partner for the 2003 USAR National Doubles Championships, as he and Todd O'Neill teamed up, which was a team of two IRF Men's Singles World Champions: Huczek being the then current champion and O'Neill being the 1996 champion. However, they lost in the quarterfinals to John Ellis and Adam Karp, 15–13, 15–11. Ellis and Karp went on to win the doubles title that year.

Huczek began a string of five multiple win seasons on the IRT in 2003–04, when he won three times. After missing the first event that season, Huczek won the next two events, and came back to win both finals. In Stockton, he lost the first game versus Álvaro Beltrán, then won the next three, 6–11, 11–8, 11–6, 11–4, and Huczek came back from two games down to defeat Cliff Swain in the final in Arlington, Virginia, 7–11, 2–11, 11–2, 11–5, 11–9. His 3rd win came in Cleveland, where he again beat Swain in the final, 9–11, 11–9, 11–4, 10–12, 12–10. Huczek was in three other finals, losing two to Jason Mannino and one to Kane Waselenchuk. Overall, Huczek finished 2nd to Waselenchuk in the season ending rankings.

Huczek was the defending champion in Men's Singles going into the 2004 World Championships in Anyang, South Korea, and he successfully defended his title. In the final, Huczek defeated Mexican Álvaro Beltrán, 15–3, 15–2. He reached the final with a win over Canadian Brian Istace, 15–3, 15–8. In the team event, the USA beat Mexico in the semi-finals and then Canada in the final, so Huczek was a double gold medalist.

In 2004, Huczek began a partnership with Rocky Carson for the USAR National Doubles Championships in October in Tempe, Arizona. They won the title by defeating Jason Thoerner and Mitch Williams, 15–9, 15–14, in the final. They reached the final by beating Chris Crowther and Josh Tucker in the semis, 15–3, 15–11.

In the 2004–05 IRT season, Huczek was in 8 finals, winning twice. The six losses were all to Kane Waselenchuk. But Huczek did beat Waselenchuk to win the last event of the season in Dallas, 11–9, 11–6, 9–11, 11–2, in the final. His other win came in Boston, where he beat Shane Vanderson in the final, 11–6, 4–11, 11–4, 11–6. For the 2nd year, Huczek was the #2 ranked IRT player behind Waselenchuk.

In March 2005, Huczek won Men's Singles at the Pan Am Championships in Caracas, Venezuela. In the final, he defeated Mexican Gilberto Mejia, 15–10, 15–3, and in the semi-finals, Huczek beat Canadian Corey Osborne, 15–1, 15–6.

Huczek won the 2005 USAR National Singles Championships, when he came back from a game down to defeat Rocky Carson in the final, 11–15, 15–9, 11–9. He got to the final by defeating Andy Hawthorne in the semi-finals, 15–6, 15–2.

Huczek won 5 IRT events in the 2005–06 season, and was runner up in two others. His first win was in Toronto, where he beat Canadian Kane Waselenchuk in his home country, 11–5, 6–11, 11–6, 4–11, 11–6. He lost in the semi-finals of the US Open Racquetball Championships to Cliff Swain, 11–0, 4–11, 11–4, 9–11, 11–3. Huczek then won back to back events in Riverside, California, beating Álvaro Beltrán in the final, 6–11, 11–6, 11–8, 11–9, and on Long Island, New York, where he also defeated Beltran in the final, 11-9 11–6, 11–4. In the last four events of the season, Huczek and Waselenchuk faced off in each final with Huczek winning twice and Waselenchuk winning twice. For the 3rd year, Huczek finished the season ranked #2 behind Waselenchuk.

At the 2006 USAR National Singles Championships, Huczek again faced Rocky Carson in the final, and they again needed a tie-breaker to decide the winner with Carson coming out on top, 15–10, 13–15, 11–3. Huczek reached the final by defeating Shane Vanderson in the semi-finals, 15–11, 15–1.

== 2006 – Career peaks ==
Huczek played both Men's Singles and Men's Doubles at the 2006 World Championships in Santo Domingo, Dominican Republic. In singles, he won gold for the third consecutive time, beating team-mate Shane Vanderson in the final, 15–10, 14–15, 11–4. But in doubles, he and Rocky Carson lost to Mexicans Álvaro Beltrán and Javier Moreno in the final, 15–8, 15–14. However, the USA defeated Canada to win the Men's Team event, as Huczek defeated Kris Odegard, 15–5, 15–9, and then teamed up with Carson to beat Mike Green and Brian Istace, 15–2, 15–4, in doubles.

Huczek and Carson again won the USAR National Doubles Championship in October 2006 by defeating Andy Hawthorne and Jeff Stark in the final. They got to the final with a win over Jeff Bell and Doug Ganim in the semi-finals.

With 9 wins, 2006–07 was Huczek's best IRT season, and the only one in which he reached at least the semi-finals in every event. He won the first four events of the season, beating Álvaro Beltrán in Kansas City, 11–9, 11–9, 6–11, 11–5, Jason Mannino in both Bowling Green, Kentucky, 11–0, 8–11, 11–5, 11–4, and Toronto, 11–3, 11–5, 11–5, and Rocky Carson in Albuquerque, 11–6, 10–12, 11–6, 12–10. However, at the US Open Racquetball Championships, Mannino got the better of Huczek, winning a close match in five games, 11–5, 11–6, 6–11, 9–11, 12–10. Yet Huczek beat Mannino in the next IRT event in Fountain Valley, California, 3–11, 11–4, 11–8, 11–7. He won the last three events of the season with two wins over Carson – in Boston and Allentown, Pennsylvania – and Mannino in Chicago. Overall, Huczek won 9 of the 13 events, and finished as the IRT's #1 player for the first and only time of his career.

The 2007 USAR National Singles Championships was unusual, as Huczek, seeded 2nd, lost in the semi-finals to Shane Vanderson, which stopped Huczek's streak of six consecutive appearances in the final. Moreover, in the final Vanderson faced Mitch Williams, who beat Rocky Carson in the other semi-final, so the 2007 final was the first since 2000 to not feature either Huczek or Carson. Williams beat Vanderson for the title.

In November 2007, Huczek reached the final of the US Open for the first time after a string of five semi-final losses. He faced Rocky Carson in the final, but after splitting the first two games, Carson won the next two to take the title in four games, 11–3, 7–11, 11–8, 11–6. Huczek beat Shane Vanderson in the semi-finals, and Jason Thoerner in the quarterfinals.

Huczek won 6 events of the IRT 2007–08 season. He faced Rocky Carson in 10 finals that season, and won four of them. Huczek's other wins came against Jason Mannino. Overall, Huczek finished 2nd on tour behind Carson.

In 2008, Huczek was back in the final of the USAR National Singles Championships, and his opponent was a familiar one: Rocky Carson. This time it was Carson's turn to take the title.

Nonetheless, Huczek qualified for Team USA for the 2008 World Championships in Kingscourt, Ireland, where he arrived as the three-time defending champion in Men's Singles. Huczek defeated Canadian Vincent Gagnon in the semi-finals, and faced team-mate Carson in the final. Once again they went to a tie-breaker. Huczek had match point opportunities in both the second game and the breaker, but in the end Carson came out on top, winning 12–15, 15–14, 11–10, to take the title for the first time. Nonetheless, Huczek set a record for playing in four straight Men's Singles finals at Worlds.

Huczek faced Kane Waselenchuk in the quarterfinals of the first IRT event of the 2008–09 season, as Waselenchuk was coming back from his two-season suspension. They split the first two games, and then Waselenchuk won it in four, 11–5, 9–11, 11–8, 11–2, in Denver. Huczek made six finals that season, but only won once, when he beat Rocky Carson in Edmonton, a tournament Waselenchuk didn't attend. Overall, Huczek finished 3rd in the rankings behind Waselenchuk and Carson. It was his lowest ranking since 2002–03, when he was 4th.

Huczek and Carson teamed up again for the 2009 USAR National Doubles Championship, reaching the final against Ben Croft and Mitch Williams, which they narrowly won, 15–9, 7–15, 11–10. The doubles partners were opponents in the final of the 2009 USAR National Singles Championship, which also ended with an 11–10 tie-breaker with Huczek coming out on top, 7–15, 15–9, 11–10. Earlier, Huczek defeated Shane Vanderson in the semi-finals, 15–7, 15–6, and Jose Rojas in the quarterfinals, 15–7, 15–6.

Huczek's silver medal in Men's Singles at the World Championships in 2008 qualified him for the 2009 World Games in Kaohsiung, Republic of China, where he won gold in Men's Singles by defeating Rocky Carson in the final, 2–15, 15–12, 11–8. Huczek also needed a tie-breaker to get to the final, as he went three games with Canadian Vincent Gagnon in the semi-finals, winning 3–15, 15–8, 11–7.

During the 2009–10 IRT season, Huczek failed to win a tournament for the first time since he'd become a regular tour player in 2001–02. There were only 9 events that season, and Huczek made 6 of the finals, losing to Kane Waselenchuk 5 times and Jason Mannino once. However, Huczek did finish as the #2 player, one better than he had the season before.

Huczek and Carson also met in the final of the 2010 US National Singles Championship, when Carson won 15–11, 15–5. In the semi-finals, Huczek defeated Andy Hawthorne, 14–15, 15–7, 11–2.

Huczek once again represented the US at Worlds, as he went to Seoul, South Korea for the 2010 World Championships. He reached the Men's Singles final for a record extending fifth time. The final was a repeat of 2008, as Huczek faced team-mate Carson, who had ended Huczek's run of Men's Singles titles at Worlds at three in 2008. Carson beat Huczek, 15–13, 15–14, once again to win his 2nd World Championship. Huczek reached the final with a win over Canadian Vincent Gagnon, 15–12, 15–12, in the semi-finals.

Huczek returned to the IRT winner's circle in the 2010–11 season, as he defeated Rocky Carson in the final of the New York City Pro-Am, 7–11, 12–10, 11–7, 8–11, 11–9. But that was his only final appearance that season. The Mexico Open was the last event of the season in Tijuana, Mexico, and Huczek lost in the quarterfinals to Jose Rojas, 11–7, 11–13, 1–11, 11–9, 12–10, in what would be the final IRT match of Huczek's career.

Carson and Huczek won USAR National Doubles in 2011, as they defeated Chris Crowther and Shane Vanderson in the final, 15–7, 5–15, 11–10. They beat Andy Hawthorne and Jose Rojas in the semi-finals, 15–13, 15–10. That was Huczek's last competitive match, as he retired prior to the 2011 USAR National Singles Championships.

== Career summary ==
In his pro career, Huczek won 29 IRT tournaments (5th most in IRT history as of March 1, 2019) across 63 final appearances (6th most) in 127 IRT tournaments (18th most), so he reached the finals in about half of the tournaments he entered and won about half of those finals. Huczek won his first IRT event in 2002 at age 19, and no one has won as a teenager since. Over his career, Huczek had a winning record against all other IRT players except for Sudsy Monchik and Kane Waselenchuk (he was 2-2 versus Jose Rojas).

As good as his IRT record was, Huczek's record in national and international competitions was better. In 11 USA Racquetball National Singles Championships, Huczek never failed to reach the semi-finals, winning the event four times and being runner up five times. Huczek also won the USA Racquetball National Doubles Championships six times (all with Rocky Carson as his partner), and was runner up once (with Eric Muller). The Huczek-Carson partnership is one of the most successful in National Doubles history.

Huczek was on Team USA 10 times, and in Men's Singles, he won 7 gold medals, 2 silver medals and a bronze, as well as a silver medal in Men's Doubles. The first gold medal was at the 2002 World Championships, and his last gold medal came at the 2009 World Games.

=== Career record ===
This table lists Huczek's results across annual events.

Event	1999	2000	2001	2002	2003	2004	2005	2006	2007	2008	2009	2010	2011
US Open	64	16	16	SF	SF	SF	SF	SF	F	SF	F	SF	-
USAR National Singles	-	SF	W	F	F	W	W	F	SF	F	W	F	-
USAR National Doubles	-	-	QF	F	QF	W	W	W	-	W	W	-	W
IRT Ranking	-	25	17	5	4	2	2	2	1	2	3	2	4

Note: W = winner, F = finalist, SF = semi-finalist, QF = quarterfinalist, 16 = Round of 16.

== Personal life and awards ==
In August 2009, Huczek married Christie Van Hees, a Canadian, who was also World Champion racquetball player. Originally from Michigan, Huczek currently resides in Bozeman, Montana with Christie and their children.

Huczek was named to USA Racquetball Hall of Fame in 2024.

== See also ==
- List of racquetball players

Sporting positions
Preceded by Kane Waselenchuk	Number 1 Men's Pro Racquetball Player; 2006–2007	Succeeded by Rocky Carson
