= Dane Elkins =

Missing professional racquetball player

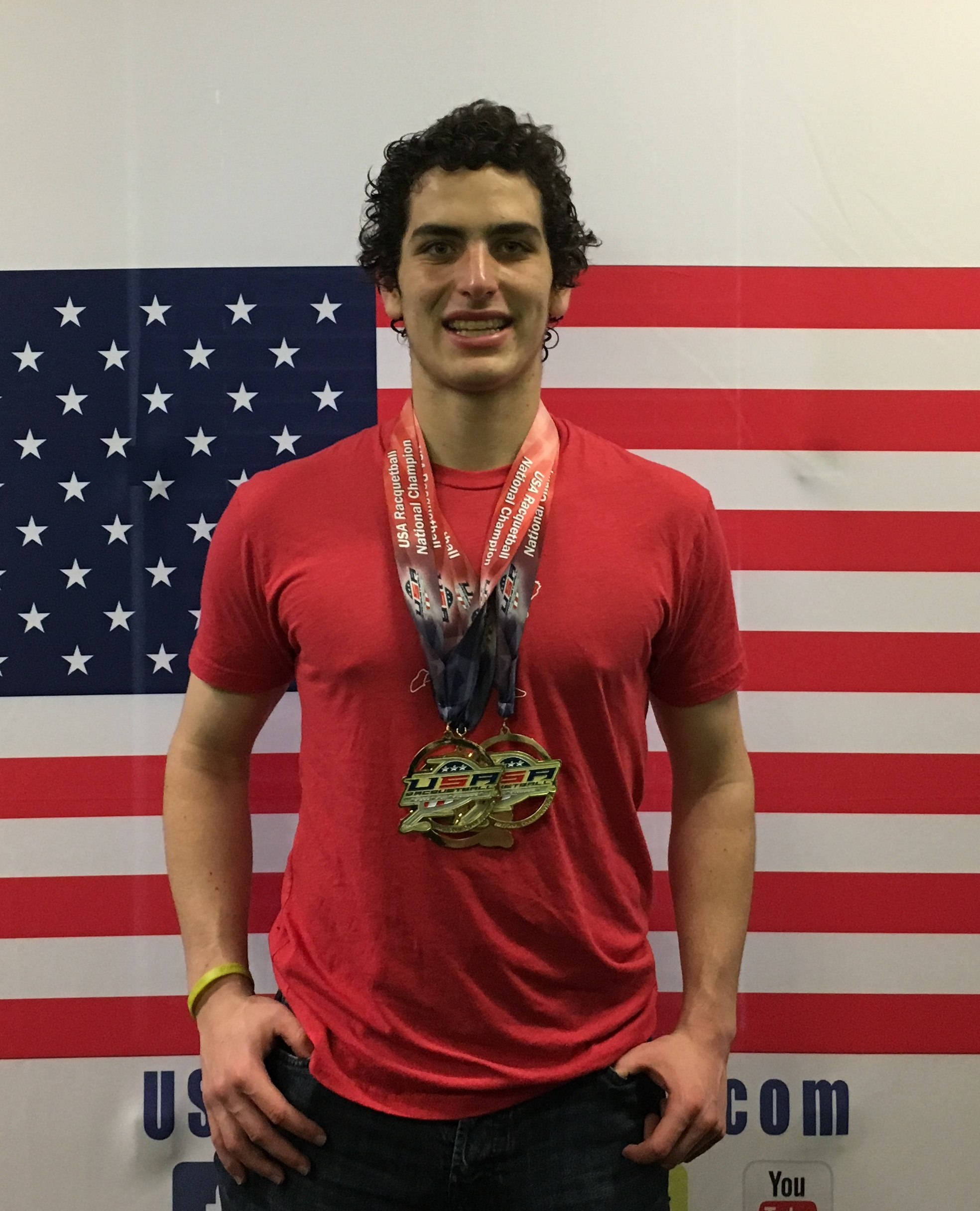
- Dane Elkins with wearing a variety of gold medals, c. 2017.

Personal information
- National team: (United States) USA
- Born: April 6, 1999 (age 27)
- Disappeared: December 21, 2020; Castaic, California; Currently missing

Sport
- Sport: Racquetball
- Coached by: Cliff Swain

Dane Elkins (born April 6, 1999) is a professional racquetball player who has been declared missing since December 2020. He holds 23 major national junior racquetball championships. He is also the 2017 National Paddleball Association (NPA) Junior's 18-and-under National Champion.

Elkins is the second person in USA Racquetball history to win all three number one gold divisions (singles, doubles, and mixed).

Elkins is an eight-time member of the USA National Junior Racquetball Team, a six-time USA Racquetball "All American," a three-time USA Jr. Olympic "All American," a three-time USA Racquetball High School "All American," and a two-time USA National Singles Champion (Boys' Division, 14 and 18). He is currently ranked 33rd on the International Racquetball Tour (IRT)

== Early and personal life ==
Elkins was a member of University Synagogue in Los Angeles, California. Before going missing, he lived in Brentwood, California. His father Brett Elkins, is a world outdoor skills three-wall champion (2012) ranked IRT player, and head of the World Outdoor Racquetball (WOR) Hall of Fame.

His younger brother, Cody Elkins, in 2015 was ranked 2nd nationally in racquetball for boys 10-and-under, finished 3rd in boys 10-and-under at the 2014 Junior Olympics, and finished 2nd in boys mixed and boys 10 doubles in 2015. He has since competed and won medals at many racquetball tournaments. He also won a gold medal in 14-and-under mixed doubles racquetball at the 2018 Junior Olympics with Camilla Gomez. He attended Santa Monica College and then University of California, Santa Cruz, for its Electrical Engineering program. He joined John Bardos as part of the UC Santa Cruz Racquetball Team. He graduated from Palisades Charter High School in Pacific Palisades, California.

=== Missing since 2020 ===
Elkins has been missing since December 21, 2020. His last known location was near Interstate 5 and Templin Highway in the area of Castaic, California, at about 8:20 p.m., where his car was found abandoned with a flat tire, according to the Los Angeles Police Department. At the time of his disappearance Elkins was reported to be "displaying signs of paranoia," with his mother stating that he believed "the government was after him and our family," and that he said "your life is in danger mom, there’s targets on you and there’s more targets on dad." Elkins reportedly made an unexplained, emergency call to 911 from the location where his abandoned vehicle and belongings were located by law enforcement. According to Elkin's mother, a "credible sighting" of Elkins was reported in February 2022 by two people in Mojave, California.

== Racquetball career ==
In 2011, Elkins won a full scholarship from the IRT professional racquetball Network/USA Racquetball (USAR) team to attend the United States Olympic Committee (USOC) Olympic Training Seminar in Colorado Springs, Colorado.

=== 2013 ===
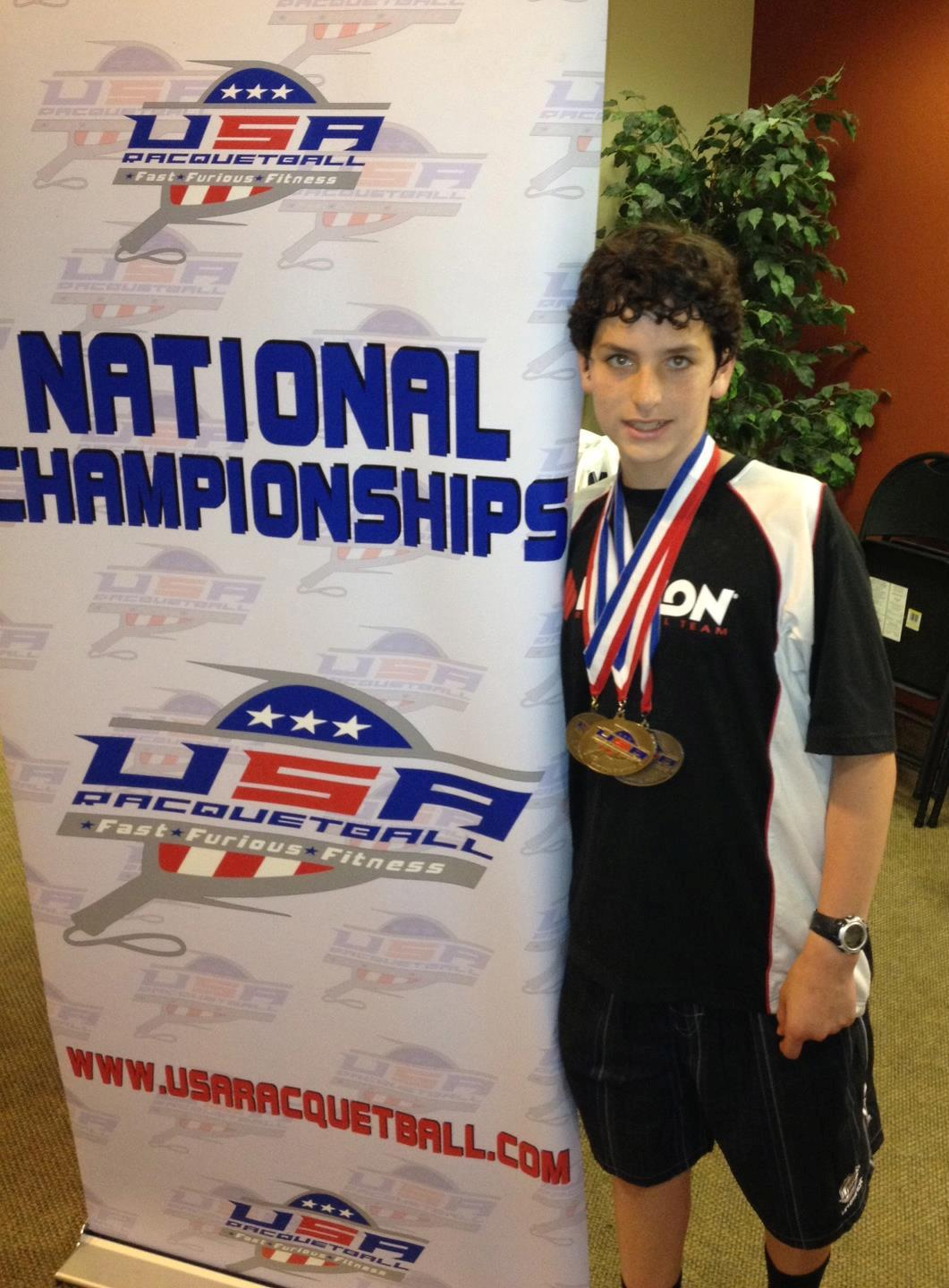
USAR National Singles Championship, 2013

In July 2013 at the 45th annual WOR Championships, Elkins made the national outdoor team in singles and doubles.

=== 2014 ===
At the 2014 Wilson Junior Olympics in Denver, Colorado, Elkins won the gold medal in 14-and-under boys doubles with partner Ricardo Diaz. He also won the gold medal for 14-and-under mixed doubles with partner Atossa Rejaei.

Elkins made the 2014 USA Junior National Team and played at the World Championships in Cali, Colombia, representing Team USA in October 2014. The USA Jr. National Team finished third overall, receiving a bronze medal. Elkins and partner Ricky Diaz eventually lost in the quarterfinals in doubles to the team that was later awarded a silver medal.

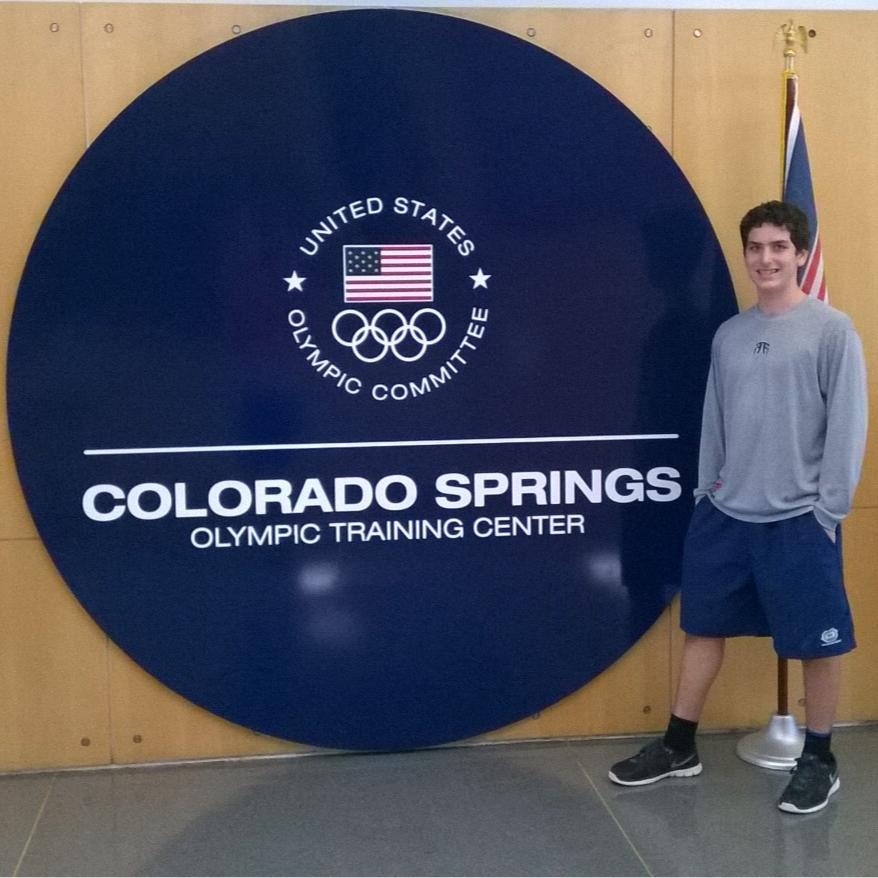
USOC Training Center, 2014

In 2014, at the 47th annual USA Racquetball National Singles Championship in Fullerton, California, Elkins won the gold medal in the boys' 14-and-under and boys 18-and-under events. In July 2014 and August 2016, Elkins again attended the USOC Olympic Training Camp.

Elkins won his first professional racquetball match in 2014 in Fresno, California at age 15.

=== 2016 ===
At the 2016 World Jr. Championships, Elkins had his best showing as a two-time quarter-finalist in singles and doubles. As a National Outdoor USA Team member, Elkins has achieved outdoor racquetball #1 world ranking four times.

=== 2017 ===
In March 2017, he became only the second player in US history to win the top singles, doubles, and mixed doubles titles at the USA Racquetball National High School Championships in St. Louis. In total, he had won 21 major national championship junior titles. He was ranked Number 35 on the International Racquetball Pro Tour, the highest ranking for anybody 17 years old or younger. Later that month, he won the Boys 18s singles division. He also won the gold medal in the 18-and-under mixed doubles division with Elena Dent.

Dane was invited to play for Team USA at the 2017 Junior World Championships. Dane won several matches at Jr. Worlds in pool play. At Jr. Worlds, Dane made the quarterfinals in singles and contributed to a 3rd place Team USA overall finish.

In June 2018, Dane was named the 2017 Palisades Charter High School's "Top Male Athlete or 'Cup' award winner," which is voted on by the Palisadian-Post private newspaper.

=== 2018 ===
In January 2018, the California-Nevada State Racquetball Association (CSRA) held a State Juniors Championship featuring $1200 in prize money for the 18-and-younger singles' divisions to entice the top CA Juniors to play. The non-profit organization Reaching Your Dream Foundation and Michael Lippitt funded the prize money for the event. Dane competed against 5 top USA National Team Members including partner Ricky Diaz, Julian Singh, Krish and Salil Thakur, and Antonio Rojas. Dane won the $500 first-place 18-and-younger prize.

In June 2018, Dane won the 18-and-under Gold Doubles (top divisions) with Ricardo Diaz in their final season together as juniors. Dane also won Gold Mixed 18-and-under doubles with Taylor Shaw. Dane lost in the finals of the boys' gold 18-and-under singles to partner Ricardo Diaz and thus qualified for the USA team in singles and doubles.

At the World Junior Championships held in San Luis Potosí, Mexico, Dane lost a tiebreaker to the number 1 seed from Bolivia and finished 3rd place in doubles with Ricardo Diaz; Dane also made the quarters in singles. Team USA took a bronze at Jr. Worlds.

=== 2019 ===
In January 2019, at a tier-1 IRT pro stop held in Canoga Park, California, in Open Divisions' play, Dane beat Justus Benson, a player seeded #3 on the World Racquetball Tour (WRT) pro tour event.

== Features ==
Elkins was featured on the Palisadian-Post Sports Page on June 28, 2016. He was also featured, along with several other acclaimed athletes from the Pacific Palisades, in a December 24, 2015, article in the Palisadian-Post, "Top Athletes of the Year in 2015."

In the Spring 2014 edition of USA Racquetball, Elkins contributed an article on the January 2014 California-Nevada junior racquetball championships.

== Highlights ==
Elkins was interviewed by the Palisadian-Post following the Junior World Championships held in Cali, Colombia. Elkins and his teammates brought home the bronze medal for Team USA.

Elkins defeated Lucas Shoemaker at the 2015 Jr Olympics, boys 16 gold division.

The 2016 National Olympic Junior Championships, boys 16 gold division doubles, featured their Championship match on USA Racquetball National Streaming. Elkins and Ricky Diaz defeated Mitch Turner (Oregon) and Julian Singh (California) to make the USA National Jr. Team.
