= David Peck =

David or Dave Peck may refer to:

- David J. Peck (1826–1855), American physician
- David W. Peck (1902–1990), American jurist
- Dave Peck (musician), see Piano Jazz
- Dave Peck (racquetball) who played with Marty Hogan

== See also ==
- David Richmond-Peck (born 1974), Canadian actor
- David Peck Todd (1855–1939), American astronomer
