= Racquetball at the 2009 World Games =

Racquetball at the 2009 World Games.

== Medal table ==
Rank	Nation	Gold	Silver	Bronze	Total
1	United States	1	2	0	3
2	Mexico	1	0	0	1
3	Canada	0	0	1	1
3	Chile	0	0	1	1
Totals (4 entries)		2	2	2	6

== Medalists ==
Event	Gold	Silver	Bronze
Men's singles	Jack Huczek (USA)	Rocky Carson (USA)	Vincent Gagnon (CAN)
Women's singles	Paola Longoria (MEX)	Rhonda Rajsich (USA)	Angela Grisar (CHI)
