= Egan Inoue =

Brazilian Jiu-Jitsu practitioner, racquetball player and mixed martial artist for Hawaii

- Born: June 4, 1965 (age 61); Honolulu, Hawaii, United States
- Height: 5 ft 9 in (1.75 m)
- Weight: 190 lb (86 kg; 14 st)
- Division: Middleweight; Light Heavyweight
- Style: Shootfighting, Brazilian Jiu-Jitsu, Boxing, Muay Thai, Wrestling, Karate, Taekwondo, Hapkido, Judo, Jeet Kune Do, Jujutsu, Kung Fu, Tang Soo Do, Kendo
- Team: Grappling Unlimited Hawaii
- Teachers: Satoru Sayama; John Lewis
- Rank: 6th Dan Black Belt in Brazilian Jiu-Jitsu (under John Lewis); Black Belt in Taekwondo; Black Belt in Hapkido; Black Belt in Shotokan Karate; Blue Shirt in Wing Chun Kung Fu; Black Belt in Jujutsu; Brown Belt in Judo

Mixed martial arts record
- Total: 21
- Wins: 13
- By knockout: 4
- By submission: 8
- By decision: 1
- Losses: 8
- By knockout: 4
- By decision: 4
- Draws: 0

Other information
- Notable relatives: Enson Inoue, brother
- Mixed martial arts record from Sherdog

Egan Inoue (Japanese: イーゲン井上, born June 4, 1965) is a Brazilian jiu-jitsu practitioner, former mixed martial artist and racquetball competitor. A two-time International Racquetball Federation (IRF) World Champion, Inoue is a two-time Brazilian jiu-jitsu world champion in colored belts, the first non-Brazilian to win a gold medal at the World Jiu Jitsu Championship.

== Early life ==
Egan Inoue was born on 4 June 1965, in Honolulu, Hawaii, in a family of Japanese descent. He started practicing Shotokan Karate from a young age taught by his grandfather. He would later take up Wing Chun Kung Fu, Taekwondo, Judo, Hapkido, and Jujutsu. At 16 he started practicing racquetball becoming state champion by the time he turned 18.

== Racquetball career ==
Inoue played professional racquetball on the International Racquetball Tour, winning two tournaments, and finishing in the top 10 ranked players four times: 1986–87 to 1988–89 and 1990–91. His record on the IRT is 84–63. Inoue briefly ascended to be the No. 1 ranked player on tour in December 1990 before finishing the season ranked 6th. But Inoue's racquetball career is highlighted by two World Championships. His first came in 1986 in Orlando, Florida, when he defeated Canadian Roger Harripersad in the final, 15–2, 7–15, and 15–7. Four years later, in 1990, Inoue defeated fellow American Tim Doyle in the final, 13–15, 15–13, 15–5, to win his second World Championship. In 1989, Inoue had a 50 percent ownership in E-Force, a racquetball equipment company. In 1993, he sold his stake in E-Force and returned to jiu jitsu.

== Brazilian jiu-jitsu career ==
Inoue started training Brazilian jiu-jitsu (BJJ) in the late 1980s at Relson Gracie's academy in the late 1980s before joining the Machado academy where he earned his purple and brown belts. In 1996, Inoue won the World Brazilian Jiu-Jitsu Championship in the blue belt division. He was the first American to win the title. He then returned to Brazil in 1997 and won the World Brazilian Jiu-Jitsu Championship in the absolute purple belt division. Inoue later joined John Lewis academy where he was promoted to black belt. Inoue holds a 4th degree black belt in Jiu Jitsu.

== Mixed martial arts career ==
Inoue went on to fight professionally in MMA. He retired in 2003 but came out of retirement on May 5, 2008, beating Hans Marrero by TKO at a X-1 – Legends, an MMA show held at the Neil S. Blaisdell Center in Honolulu, Hawaii.

Inoue's MMA record is 13 wins with 8 losses. He has opened up three MMA training schools in the state of Hawaii. Inoue's MMA career led him to fights in Pride, Shooto, Superbrawl and Luminex Cup. He enjoyed a successful career with five world championship titles.

His younger brother Enson Inoue went on to become the first ever Heavyweight Champion of Shooto.

== Instructor lineage ==
Kano Jigoro → Mitsuyo "Count Koma" Maeda → Carlos Gracie → Helio Gracie → Carlson Gracie → André Pederneiras > John Lewis > Egan Inoue

== Championships and accomplishments ==
BJJ and Grappling achievements:

- IBJJF World Champion (1996 blue, 1997 (Note: Absolute) purple)
- 3rd place World Masters Championship (2014)
- 4th place ADCC World Championship (1999/2001)

Wrestling:

- Icon Sport Middleweight Championship (1 Time, First)
- Lumax Cup Tournament of 'J 95 Runner-up

== Mixed martial arts record ==
Professional record breakdown
21 matches	13 wins	8 losses
By knockout	3	3
By submission	8	0
By decision	1	4
By disqualification	1	1
Draws	0	
No contests	0	

Res.	Record	Opponent	Method	Event	Date	Round	Time	Location	Notes
Win	13–8	Hans Marrero	TKO (punches)	X-1 – Legends	May 16, 2008	1	0:59	Honolulu, Hawaii, United States	
Loss	12–8	Jason Miller	TKO (corner stoppage)	SB 32 – SuperBrawl 32	December 5, 2003	2	5:00	Honolulu, Hawaii, United States	
Loss	12–7	Masanori Suda	KO (punches)	SB 29 – SuperBrawl 29	May 9, 2003	1	0:27	Honolulu, Hawaii, United States	For Shooto Middleweight Championship. Lost Icon Spot Middleweight Championship.
Win	12–6	Yukiya Naito	Decision (unanimous)	SB 28 – SuperBrawl 28	February 8, 2003	2	5:00	Honolulu, Hawaii, United States	
Win	11–6	Martijn de Jong	KO (kick)	SB 25 – SuperBrawl 25	July 13, 2002	1	2:46	Honolulu, Hawaii, United States	
Win	10–6	Marcos da Silva	Submission (punches)	SB 23 – SuperBrawl 23	March 9, 2002	2	0:56	Honolulu, Hawaii, United States	
Win	9–6	Joe Doerksen	Submission (toe hold)	SB 22 – SuperBrawl 22	November 2, 2001	1	0:56	Honolulu, Hawaii, United States	
Win	8–6	Brett Al-azzawi	Submission (forearm choke)	SB 21 – SuperBrawl 21	May 24, 2001	1	1:29	Honolulu, Hawaii, United States	
Loss	7–6	Guy Mezger	KO (punch)	Pride 13 – Collision Course	March 25, 2001	1	2:25	Saitama, Japan	
Win	7–5	John Alessio	Submission (rear-naked choke)	SB 15 – SuperBrawl 15	December 7, 1999	1	2:41	Honolulu, Hawaii, United States	
Loss	6–5	Carl Ognibene	Decision (unanimous)	Pride 6	July 4, 1999	3	5:00	Yokohama, Kanagawa, Japan	
Win	6–4	Marcelo Tigre	DQ (excessive fouling)	SB 12 – SuperBrawl 12	June 1, 1999	2	0:12	Honolulu, Hawaii, United States	Won Icon Sport Middleweight Championship
Win	5–4	Minoru Toyonaga	TKO (punches)	Pride 5	April 29, 1999	1	5:53	Nagoya, Aichi, Japan	
Loss	4–4	Mauricio Silva	Decision	WSKF – World Challenge	December 19, 1998	3	5:00	Waikiki, Hawaii, United States	
Loss	4–3	Masayuki Naruse	DQ	Rings – Maelstrom 6	August 24, 1996	1	11:51	Japan	
Loss	4–2	Sanae Kikuta	Decision	Lumax Cup – Tournament of J '96	March 30, 1996	1	5:00	Japan	Tournament quarter-finals
Win	4–1	Yasunobu Matsuo	Submission (armlock)	Lumax Cup – Tournament of J '96	March 30, 1996	1	1:20	Japan	Tournament qualifier
Win	3–1	Gordon Dehdman	Submission (triangle choke)	Shooto – Vale Tudo Junction 2	March 5, 1996	1	1:39	Tokyo, Japan	
Loss	2–1	Tsuyoshi Kohsaka	Decision (unanimous)	Lumax Cup – Tournament of J '95	October 13, 1995	3	3:00	Japan	Tournament finals
Win	2–0	Akihiro Gono	Submission (armbar)	Lumax Cup – Tournament of J '95	October 13, 1995	1	1:33	Japan	Tournament semi-finals
Win	1–0	Alexander Otsuka	Submission (armbar)	Lumax Cup – Tournament of J '95	October 13, 1995	1	0:55	Japan	Tournament quarter-finals

== Submission grappling record ==
KO PUNCHES

Result	Opponent	Method	Event	Date	Round	Time	Notes
Loss	(Brazil) Nino Schembri	Points	ADCC 2001 –88 kg 3rd place	2001	1	10:00	
Loss	(Japan) Sanae Kikuta	Points	ADCC 2001 –88 kg	2001	1	10:00	
Win	(Brazil) Ricardo Liborio	Points	ADCC 2001 –88 kg	2001	1	15:00	
Win	(Russia) Vladimir Zharkov	Submission (rear naked choke)	ADCC 2001 –88 kg	2001	1	9:30	
Win	(Russia) Emil Khachatryan	Points	ADCC 2000 –88 kg	2000	1	10	
Loss	(Brazil) Ricardo Liborio	Points	ADCC 1999 –88 kg 3rd place	1999	1	10	
Loss	(Russia) Karim Barkalaev	Points	ADCC 1999 –88 kg	1999	1	10	
Win	(Brazil) Renzo Gracie	Points	ADCC 1999 –88 kg	1999	1	10	
Win	(United States) Robbie Kilpatrick	Submission (armbar)	ADCC 1999 –88 kg	1999	1	9:25	

== See also ==
- List of male mixed martial artists
- List of racquetball players
