= Jason Mannino =

American racquetball player

Personal information
- Born: January 28, 1975 (age 51) (United States) New York

Sport
- Sport: Racquetball
- Turned pro: 1995
- Coached by: Fran Davis
- Retired: 2010

Achievements and titles
- Highest world ranking: 1st 2002-03

Jason Mannino, born January 28, 1975, is a retired American racquetball player. Mannino was the #1 player at the end of the 2002-2003 International Racquetball Tour (IRT) season, and is a two-time winner of the US Open. He was named to the USA Racquetball Hall of Fame in 2020.

Mannino's game style was unique, as he rarely hit drive serves, relying instead on a variety of half lob serves. Then during rallies he frequently dove to keep a rally going, hitting the ball to the ceiling while waiting for an opportunity to hit a winning shot.

== Professional career ==
Mannino began playing full-time on the International Racquetball Tour in 1995, and finished in the top 10 each of his full seasons on tour until his retirement after the 2009-10 season. Indeed, Mannino’s lowest ranking was 7th at the end of his first season, and he was never outside of the top 5 in the next 14 seasons hitting a career high at #1 at the end of the 2002-03 season. His 15 seasons in the top 10 are third most for an IRT player behind only Cliff Swain (20) and Rocky Carson (16).

Overall, Mannino won 22 IRT tournaments in his career, placing him 7th on the all-time list, and was runner up on 18 other occasions, so he had a winning record when in a final (22-18). Mannino’s 193 appearances in IRT tournament puts him 4th all time behind Swain (with 286), Carson (222) and Ruben Gonzalez (216) (through the 2015-16 season).

Mannino's career is highlighted by two US Open titles in 1999 and 2006. In 1999, Mannino defeated Swain in the final, 11-8, 4-11, 11-8, 11-8, Sudsy Monchik in the semi-finals, 11-8, 9-11, 11-5, 11-3, and Dan Fowler in the quarterfinals, 11-9, 11-0, 11-4. His 2006 win came at the expense of Rocky Carson in the final, 11-9, 11-8, 11-5, Jack Huczek in the semi-finals, 11-5, 11-6, 6-11, 9-11, 12-10, in the semi-finals, and Swain in the quarterfinals, 11-8, 13-11, 11-2.

Seven years is the longest period between US Open wins by a player. Also, Mannino's only one of four men - along with Kane Waselenchuk, Sudsy Monchik and Cliff Swain - to win the US Open more than once.

== International career ==
Mannino won a World Junior title in Boy's 18 and under singles in 1994, and in Boy's 18 & under doubles in 1992 with partner Sudsy Monchik. But Mannino never played for Team USA as an adult.

== Personal ==
Originally from New York City, Mannino now resides in San Diego, where he's lived since the early 1990s. His career almost didn't happen, as he suffered severe injuries following a car accident when he was 18. Mannino won his World Junior title only two months after beginning to play again following the accident.

During his career and afterwards, Mannino did numerous racquetball instructional clinics and camps often with his coach Fran Davis, and the two of them wrote Championship Racquetball.

Mannino was inducted into the USA Racquetball Hall of Fame in 2020.

Sporting positions
Preceded by Cliff Swain	Number 1 Men's Pro Racquetball Player; 2002-2003	Succeeded by Kane Waselenchuk
