= Sudsy Monchik =

American racquetball player

Personal information
- Nationality: American
- Born: October 12, 1974 (age 52)

Sport
- Sport: Racquetball

Achievements and titles
- Highest world ranking: 1st 1995-96, 1996-97, 1998-99, 1999-2000, 2000-01
Medal record
Men's Racquetball
Representing USA
World Championships
Silver medal – second place	2018 San José	Doubles
Pan American Games
Gold medal – first place	1995 Argentina	Doubles
Gold medal – first place	1995 Argentina	Team

Sudsy Monchik (born October 12, 1974), is an American racquetball player. As a five-time Pro World Champion, Monchik is one of the top 3 players in the history of the sport.

Sudsy is the only player on record to have won a National title or higher in five straight decades. 80's, 90's, 00's, 10's, 20's.

== Professional career ==
Monchik won the US Open, racquetball's most prestigious event, in its first year 1996, and then again three more times, in 1998, 2000, and 2002. He and Kane Waselenchuk are the only two men to win the US Open more than twice.

Monchik's 50+ tournament wins places him fourth in career tournament wins behind only Cliff Swain (70), Kane Waselenchuk (111), and Marty Hogan (60). He compiled those wins in 137 tournament appearances, 13th all time.

Monchik won at least one pro tournament in each of his first 8 seasons competing on the pro tour from 1993-94 to 2000-01. However, after failing to win for a second season, Monchik retired from the International Racquetball Tour (IRT) after the 2003-04 season. He came back in the 2006-07 season, playing 9 of 13 events, but only reached the semi-finals once, and retired again.

Sudsy continues to stay involved as a commentator and advisor to the top organizations and governing bodies in the sport. Sudsy made an amazing return to the professional tour in October 2017 with a quarter final finish at the United Healthcare US OPEN which he previously won 4 times.

In January 2021, Sudsy with his partner Alex Landa won the Men’s Professional Doubles in Atlanta, GA.

== International career ==
Prior to turning pro, Monchik won three consecutive World Junior titles in Boy's 18 and under from 1991–1993, as well as doubles titles in Boys 18 & under with James Mulcock in 1993 and Jason Mannino in 1992.

Monchik represented the USA in the 1995 Pan American Games in Argentina, where he played doubles with Tim Sweeney, winning the gold medal by defeating Canadians Chris Brumwell and Jacques Demers in the final.

Sudsy is the only player in the history of the sport to win every age division at the Junior Nationals in both singles and doubles. All doubles titles with Jason Mannino. In February 2018 Sudsy made another amazing return to racquetball. He and his partner Rocky Carson won the USA National Doubles Championships. At age 43, Sudsy has once again qualified to play on Team USA and compete in the World Championships in August 2018 in South America. In February 2020 Sudsy once again amazed the sport by winning the USA National Doubles with partner Alex Landa and qualified for Team USA for the 2020-2021 year.

== Post-playing career ==
In 2006, Monchik was forced into retirement due to a back injury diagnosed as spondylolisthesis. Monchik was selected for induction into the USA Racquetball Hall of Fame in 2015. Previously, he was selected as an inductee into the 2008-2009 Staten Island Sports Hall of Fame.

In 2013, Monchik began an association with Dunlop Racquetball. Dunlop and Sudsy ended their relationship in 2015 when Dunlop decided to leave the racquetball category. Sudsy also was a commentator for that year's US Open Racquetball Championships, which were broadcast on Tennis Channel. To date, Sudsy has led the youth and senior Ecuador national teams' to the best results in the country's international competition history. Events coached, Pan American Games, Toronto Canada in July 2015, Junior World Championships, Santo Domingo Dominican Republic 2015, Pan American Championships, San Luis Potosí Mexico in 2016, World Championships in Cali Colombia 2016, Junior World Championships 2016 in San Luis Potosí Mexico, San Jose José Costa Rica 2017 Pan Am Championships. Sudsy resigned as Head Coach of Ecuador in July 2017 for personal reasons. Sudsy continues to coach and advise players of all levels worldwide. Some notable players include: Gaby Martinez-GUA, Conrado Moscoso-BOL, Jose Ubilla-CR, Mari Cruz Ortiz-CR, María José Vargas-ARG, Montse Mejia-MX

Sudsy is known to be the most influential ambassador in the sport of racquetball and continues to promote racquetball worldwide.

== See also ==
- List of racquetball players

Sporting positions
Preceded by Cliff Swain; Cliff Swain	Number 1 Men's Pro Racquetball Player; 1995-1996 to 1996-1997; 1998-1999 to 2000-2000	Succeeded by Cliff Swain; Cliff Swain
