= Kane Waselenchuk =

Canadian racquetball player

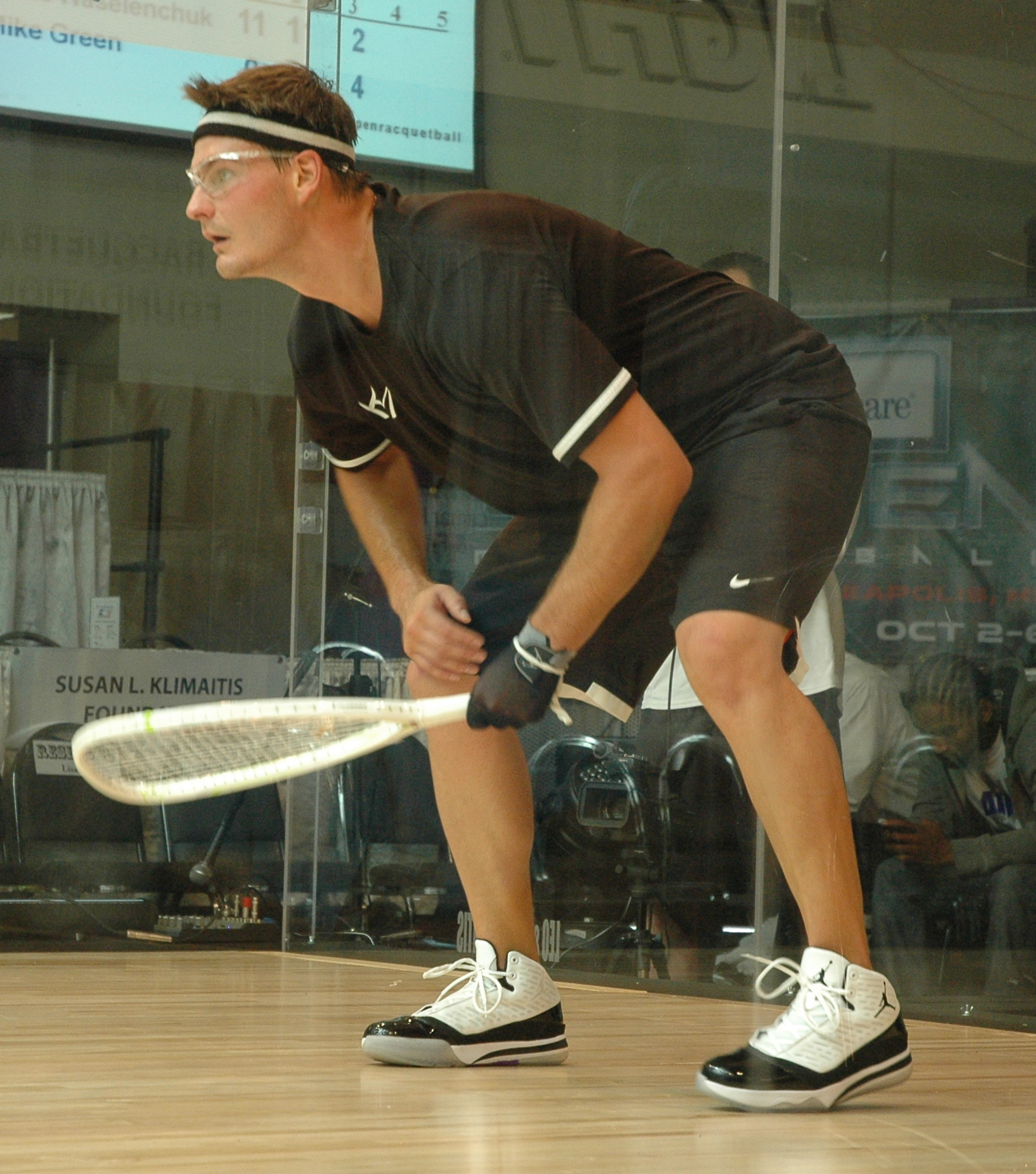
- Waselenchuk at 2014 US Open Racquetball Championships

Personal information
- Nationality: Canadian
- Born: November 9, 1981 (age 44) Edmonton, Alberta, Canada
- Height: 5 ft 10 in (178 cm)
- Weight: 190

Sport
- Country: USA
- Sport: Racquetball
- Turned pro: 2000
- Coached by: Jim Winterton

Achievements and titles
- National finals: 1st Singles 1999–2001, 1st Doubles 2001
- Highest world ranking: 1 2004–2006, 2009–2017, 2019
Medal record
Men's Racquetball
Representing Canada
World Championships
Gold medal – first place	2000 Mexico	Team
Gold medal – first place	2002 Puerto Rico	Team
Bronze medal – third place	1998 Cochabamba	Doubles
Bronze medal – third place	2002 Puerto Rico	Singles
Pan American Championships
Gold medal – first place	2002 Cochabamba	Singles
Silver medal – second place	1999 Rosarito	Doubles
Silver medal – second place	2001 San Pedro Sula	Singles

Kane Waselenchuk (born November 9, 1981) is a professional racquetball player born in Edmonton, Alberta, Canada. Waselenchuk finished the 2018–19 season as the #1 player on the International Racquetball Tour (IRT) for a record extending 13th time. Waselenchuk, a left-handed player, has dominated the IRT for the last decade, including a record 134-match unbeaten streak that lasted over three years.

== Professional career ==
Waselenchuk has won 118 IRT tournaments through the 2019 US Open, which is the most career IRT wins ahead of Cliff Swain with 71. Remarkably, Waselenchuk's won those 118 tournaments in only 172 tournament appearances for a tournament winning rate of 68.6%.

Waselenchuk has won 15 US Open Racquetball Championships, pro racquetball's most prestigious event, which is more than any other player (Sudsy Monchik is second with four US Open titles). He won it from 2003 to 2005 and from 2008 to 2019.

Waselenchuk was undefeated in completed matches between January 2009 and September 2013 with his only losses coming from defaults due to injury. The streak was ended by Jose Rojas in the semi-finals of the Kansas City Pro-Am – the first IRT tournament of the 2013–14 season.

=== Early Seasons 2000–01 to 2002–2003 ===
In his first tournament in April 2000 at age 18, Waselenchuk made it to the quarter finals before falling to Cliff Swain in five games. Then in October he played in his first US Open and upset defending champion Jason Mannino in the Round of 32 before falling in the quarters to Álvaro Beltrán.

Waselenchuk won his first IRT tournament in October 2001 a few weeks short of his 20th birthday, defeating John Ellis in the final of the Chicago event. He finished #4 in his first full season on the IRT. Waselenchuk improved to a #2 season ending ranking in 2002–03 (behind only Jason Mannino), winning 3 of the 5 finals he was in that season.

=== Middle Seasons 2003–04 to 2005–2006 ===
Waselenchuk began to dominate the IRT in 2003–04, when he won 6 of 13 IRT events, including his first US Open title, and he finished as the #1 IRT player for the first time.

In 2004–05, Waselenchuk continued his dominance of the IRT by winning 8 of the 12 tournaments he entered, including the 2004 US Open, the second of his career. In the US Open final he gave up only four points to former IRT #1 Cliff Swain, winning 11–1, 11–3, 11–0. The 0 or donut is the first time a player has held his opponent scoreless in a US Open final. Waselenchuk successfully retained the season ending #1 ranking on the IRT.

In 2005–06, Waselenchuk won 4 of the 10 IRT main events this season, including a third straight US Open title, when he again beat Swain in the final, but this time by scores of 11–5, 12–10, 12–10, and finished #1 at season's end.

=== Seasons 2008–09 to 2017–18 ===
In 2008–09, Waselenchuk went 49–1, with the only loss to Álvaro Beltrán in the semi-finals of the California Open in January 2009. He regained the US Open title – his fourth, although did lose some games on the road to the final, including two in a tie-breaker win over Beltran. Waselenchuk finishes as the #1 IRT player for the fourth time, although he did miss three events.

Waselenchuk won 9 of the 10 IRT events in the 2009–10 season – defeating Jack Huczek in six finals and Rocky Carson in two, and Ben Croft in another. He won 102 games and lost only 3, and did not face a tie-breaking 5th game in any match. The only tournament Waselenchuk did not win was one he missed due to illness. In October, he won his 5th US Open title setting a new mark for most US Open titles by a man, passing Sudsy Monchik's 4 titles, and did not lose a game in winning the title.

In 2010–11, Waslenchuk won 12 IRT events, including a 6th US Open victory. He played Mexican Álvaro Beltrán in that final, and Beltran won the first game, which was the first time Waselenchuk had lost a game in a US Open final. Waselenchuk entered the 2011 New York City Pro-Am, but withdrew due to illness prior to his semi-final with Jack Huczek.

Waselenchuk won nine tournaments in each of the 2011–12 and 2012–13 IRT seasons, including his 7th and 8th US Open, which is the most by any player. His only loss in 2012–13 came in the Denver Pro-Am, when he hurt his knee in the final against Rocky Carson and had to retire after the third game, with Carson leading 2–1.

Waselenchuk won eight of the nine IRT tournaments he entered in the 2013–14 season. The loss came against Jose Rojas in the semi-finals of the Kansas City Pro-Am – the first IRT tournament of the season. He then won his 9th US Open, which set the career IRT tournament wins record. But in doing so he was injured, and missed the next two IRT events as a result. Upon his return, Waselenechuk won out the rest of the season: seven straight tournaments.

In the 2014–15 season, Waselenchuk missed three events in the first part of the season due to a recurrence of the vestibular problems he'd had earlier in his career. He came back for the Garden City, Kansas event, but forfeited his quarterfinal match due to the problem. As result of these absences and the quarterfinal result, Waselenchuk was the #2 ranked player for most of the second half of the IRT season behind Carson. But by winning the last event of the season in Fresno, California, Waselenchuk passed Carson in the rankings to finish #1 for a 10th season.

He won 10 of the 14 Tier 1/Grand Slam events in the 2015–16 season to finish #1 by a fair margin over his competition and secure his 11th pro title. His record of 41-3 for the season includes two tournament withdrawals and one on-the-court injury forfeit in May 2016. He missed one tournament altogether.

In the 2016–17 season, Waselenchuk won 7 of the 9 events, missed the other two tournaments and was undefeated at 29-0 for the season to secure his 12th pro title. More impressively, he was undefeated in GAMES for this season, finishing the year 85-0 in games played, part of an amazing streak of 113 consecutive games won by Waselenchuk during this time period on tour.

He began the 2017–18 season in dominant fashion, winning the first four events, including his 13th US Open title in October, 2017. He suffered what appeared initially to be an innocuous looking knee injury in a semi finals win in January 2018's Canoga Park event, but it turned out to be a Grade 2 MCL sprain that cost him most of the second half of this season. He made his return to the court for the season's final event, but was not able to secure enough points to retain the pro title. When Rocky Carson secured a place in the finals of the Sarasota, Florida pro event in April 2018, he was guaranteed to finish no higher than #2 for the year. He still won the event, defeating Carson in the final and finishing the season 24-2 (with both losses being injury defaults).

=== Retirement ===
Immediately after downing Carson for the final title of the year on 4/28/18, and hours after he was dethroned as champ after a decade on top, Waselenchuk announces that he is "90% sure that he's retiring" in his post-game interview on the court (see the 46:30 point of the Facebook Live video link). He's going to "take the summer" to think about it but says that he "isn't enjoying playing as much as he used to" and he may just show up at the US Open to "play spoiler" next year. He qualifies his announcement with a quick Facebook post saying that his announcement had nothing to do with "his injury or travel." In a wide-ranging interview with Dylan Reid on The Racquetball Show in August 2018, he remained noncommittal to playing the tour full time again, citing differences with the current tour management regarding his compensation model given his stature on the tour.

== International and Canadian competitions ==
Waselenchuk has played for Canada eight times: at the 1998, 2000 and 2002 International Racquetball Federation (IRF) World Championships, 1999–2002 Pan American Championships as well as the 1999 Pan American Games. In those appearances, Waselenchuk won gold once (in singles at the 2002 Pan American Championships), silver twice (both at the Pan American Championships; one in singles in 2001 and one in doubles with Brian Istace in 1999), and bronze twice (both at the World Championships, in 2002 in singles and in 1998 in doubles with Mike Green).

Waselenchuk won the Canadian Championship three consecutive years, from 1999 to 2001. He also won the doubles title in 2001 with Brian Istace.

Waselenchuk would have won a fourth title in 2006, but following the final match in which he defeated Mike Green, Waselenchuk failed a drug test for "cannabis and cocaine metabolite" after winning the Canadian Nationals. That positive test led to a two-year suspension from racquetball, so Waselenchuk did not play in the 2006–07 and 2007–08 IRT seasons.

== Outdoor Competition ==
Waselenchuk made a foray into outdoor racquetball competition on two occasions. In October 2020, he partnered with Ben Croft and made an impressive run to the finals of the 3WB grand slam in Las Vegas, losing to what many considered to be the top outdoor team at the time, Daniel De La Rosa and Alvaro Beltran. Later, in 2023 Waselenchuk entered the Outdoor Nationals in Huntington Beach, CA, this time playing with Alvaro Beltran. Many thought this to be the most skilled doubles team ever assembled, but they fell in the quarterfinals to the best team nobody has ever heard of, Micah Rich and Jason Geis, the reigning two-time outdoor national champions.

== Personal life ==
Waselenchuk resides in Austin, Texas. Waselenchuk is currently sponsored by Onnit, ProKennex, Nike, and Gemini.

== See also ==
- List of racquetball players

Sporting positions
Preceded by Jason Mannino; Rocky Carson; Rocky Carson	Number 1 Men's Pro Racquetball Player; 2003–2004 to 2005–2006; 2008–2009 to 2016–2017; 2018–19 to 2019-2020	Succeeded by Jack Huczek; Rocky Carson; Daniel De La Rosa
