= Ben Croft =

American racquetball player

Personal information
- Nationality: American
- Born: February 11, 1985 (age 41) Lake Forest, Illinois
- Height: 5 ft 11 in (180 cm)

Sport
- Sport: Racquetball
- College team: Colorado State (Pueblo)
- Turned pro: 2007

Achievements and titles
- World finals: 1st Doubles (2010)
- National finals: 1st Doubles (2007, 2010, 2012)
Medal record
Men's Racquetball
Representing United States
World Championships
Bronze medal – third place	2014 Burlington	Doubles
Gold medal – first place	2010 Seoul	Doubles
Gold medal – first place	2010 Seoul	Team
Pan Am Championships
Gold medal – first place	2009 San Pedro Sula	Doubles

Ben Croft (born February 11, 1985) is an American racquetball player. Croft's a former racquetball World Champion, winning men's doubles in 2010 with Mitch Williams. His personal best ranking on the International Racquetball Tour was 3rd at the end of the 2010–11 season. Croft has been in the top 10 every IRT season since he turned pro in 2007. He often dives to keep the ball in play, earning his nickname "Racquetball's Crash Test Dummy".

== Professional career ==
Croft won the International Racquetball Tour's (IRT's) 2012 Salt Lake City Pro-Am, defeating Álvaro Beltrán in the semi-finals and Rocky Carson in the final. He made his first IRT final at the Mexico Open, which was the last tournament of the 2009–10 season, and was also in the final of 2013 Florida Spring Break tournament and 2013 Tournament of Champions, losing both finals to Kane Waselenchuk.

== International career ==
He has played on Team USA thrice. Croft won two gold medals at the 2010 World Championships, one in men's doubles with Mitch Williams and the other in the men's team competition. Croft and Williams also won gold at the 2009 Pan American Racquetball Championships.

Most recently, Croft played Men's Doubles with Tom Fuhrmann at the 2014 World Championships in Burlington, Ontario, where they lost to the Canadian team of Vincent Gagnon and Mike Green in the semi-finals, thus earning bronze medals.

As a junior player, Croft won the World Junior Racquetball Championship in Boy 18 and under twice: in 2003 and 2004. He was the 4th player to win that category twice, and the previous three – Rocky Carson, Jack Huczek and Sudsy Monchik – went on and became #1 on the IRT.

== USA career ==
Croft has won three US National Doubles titles: two with Williams, in 2007 and 2010, and most recently with Rocky Carson in 2012.

He also holds the record for total Intercollegiate Titles with seven including three singles and four doubles titles from 2004 to 2007.

== Personal ==
Croft attended Colorado State University in Pueblo, Colorado. Croft currently works at Racquetball Warehouse. He married Sarah Spinks in 2012. Their first child was born in 2014.

== See also ==
- List of racquetball players
