= Cliff Swain =

American racquetball player

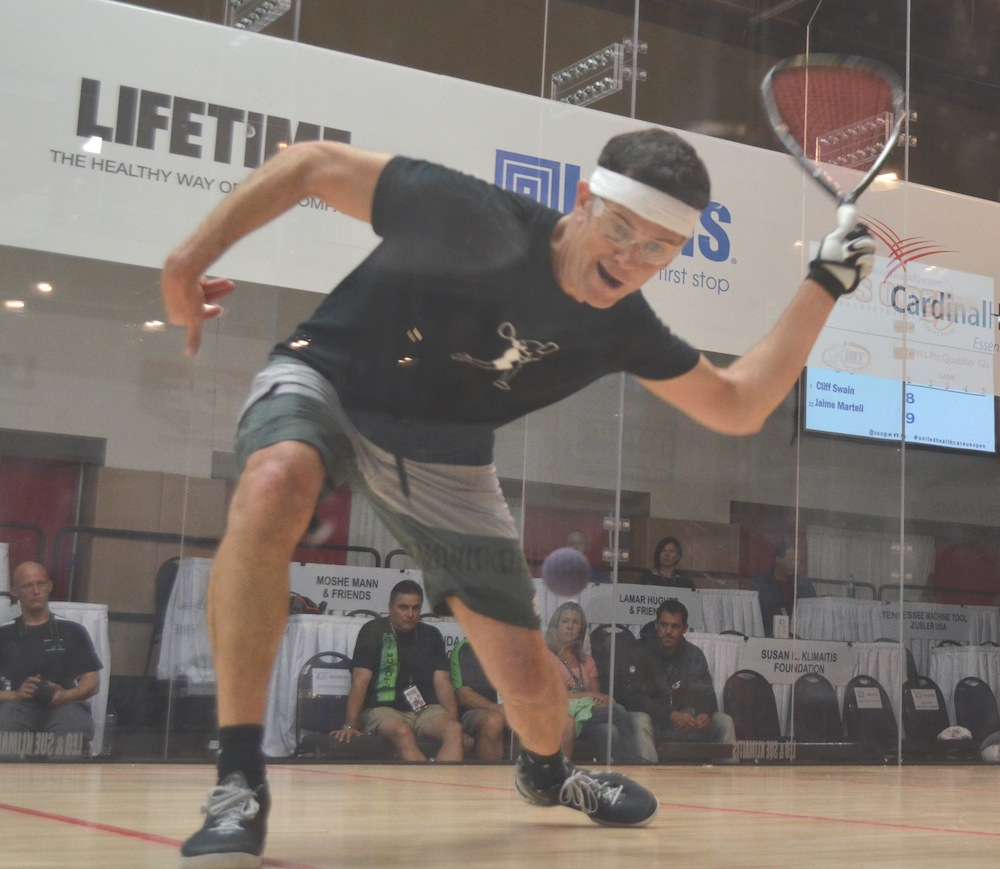
- Cliff Swain at the 2015 US Open Championships

Personal information
- Nationality: American
- Born: March 21, 1966 (age 60)

Sport
- Sport: Racquetball
- College team: Providence College
- Turned pro: 1985
- Now coaching: Maria Jose Vargas, Coby Iwaasa, Dane Elkins

Achievements and titles
- Highest world ranking: 1 (1990, 1993, 1994, 1995, 1998 & 2002)

Cliff Swain (born March 21, 1966) is a professional racquetball player and coach from Boston, Massachusetts. Known for his dominant drive serve and on-court intensity, Swain finished as the #1 player on the International Racquetball Tour (IRT) six times—in 1990, 1993, 1994, 1995, 1998, and 2002. He won US Open Championships in 1997 and 2001, and was inducted into the USA Racquetball Hall of Fame in 2003. A legendary figure in racquetball for over 3 decades, Swain still plays professionally and is quickly becoming a sought-after professional coach as well.

== Early years ==
Swain was introduced to racquetball when he was 13 years old by his father, Robert "Red" Swain, who was a competitive handball player. Swain was naturally talented and quickly picked up the game, soon winning the Massachusetts State and New England Regional Junior Racquetball Championships. He won the US Junior National 16 and Under Racquetball Championship in 1983, and the Orange Bowl World 18 and Under Junior Racquetball Championship in 1984. Swain also played on the racquetball team at Providence College in 1984 before turning professional.

== Career as a professional player ==
Swain began his career as a professional racquetball player in 1985. It was a busy year. He won his first professional title at the Tulsa Open, and his first professional National title at the Ektelon National Championships, where he consecutively beat racquetball legends, Marty Hogan, Dave Peck, and Greg Peck. Swain was aptly named the Professional Racquetball Rookie of the Year in 1985, and remained one of the top ten professional racquetball players until 1990.

In 1990, at the age of 24 and when he was ranked #1, Swain left racquetball to pursue a career in tennis at the encouragement of Ion Tiriac. Swain spent two years on the tennis circuit and had some success, although not nearly at the level he had experienced in racquetball. Swain reclaimed the #1 ranking when he returned to racquetball the following season.

Swain ended the IRT season as the #1 ranked player 6 times: in 1990, 1993, 1994, 1995, 1998, and 2002. He won the US Open Racquetball Championships 2 times, in 1997 and 2001. Swain was inducted into the USA Racquetball Hall of Fame in 2003.

Swain has continued to play championship-level racquetball after his Hall of Fame induction. He played the Legends Racquetball Tour in 2004 and 2005, winning the Legends 35+ National Championship both years. He teamed with Marty Hogan to win the 2004 and 2005 Legends National Doubles Championship as well. Swain teamed with Woody Clouse to win the 40+ USA Racquetball National Doubles Championship in 2008, and has won 4 National 45+ Doubles titles with good friend and former coach Mike Ladge: at the 2012 and 2013 Ektelon US Nationals, and the 2012 and 2014 US Open. Swain is also an accomplished outdoor racquetball player, teaming with Josh Tucker to beat #2 ranked Rocky Carson and #4 ranked Jose Rojas on the way to the 2014 World Outdoor Racquetball (WOR) Pro Doubles Championship.

== Career as a professional coach ==
Despite still competing as a professional himself, Swain is a National Racquetball Coach at Life Time Fitness and coaches juniors, adults, amateurs and professionals. His roster of notable players currently includes:

- Maria Jose Vargas - ranked #2 on the Ladies Professional Racquetball Tour (LPRT)
- Coby Iwaasa - 2015 Junior Open Singles and Doubles Canadian National Champion; 2015 Men's Open Singles and Doubles Canadian National Champion
- Dane Elkins - USA Junior National Team Member, 10-time WOR Junior World Champion, 6 USA National Junior Indoor Championships, 3 USA National High School Championships. the 2017 National Paddleball Association Junior 18-and-under National Champion.

Other professional players who Swain coaches or has coached include IRT players Jose Rojas, Charlie Pratt, Alejandro Herrera, and Brad Schopieray; and LPRT player Cece Pratt.

== Cliff Swain brand ==
Swain announced in 2014 that he was starting his own racquetball company. He developed the Cliff Swain Signature Series racquetball racquet, which is available along with other Cliff Swain Signature Series products on his website. His website features instructional videos, coaching videos, and match videos, as well as a racquetball magazine archive.

== See also ==
- List of racquetball players

Sporting positions
Preceded by Drew Kachtik; Sudsy Monchik; Sudsy Monchik	Number 1 Men's Pro Racquetball Player; 1992-1993 to 1994-95; 1997-1998; 2001-2002	Succeeded by Sudsy Monchik; Sudsy Monchik; Jason Mannino
