= Marty Hogan (racquetball) =

American racquetball player

Marty Hogan (born January 22, 1958, in St. Louis, Missouri) is a former American racquetball player who won more than 100 international or national titles and six U.S. national championships during his 14-year career. Hogan was ranked either number one or number two in the world from 1976 to 1990.

== Early years ==
He was born in St. Louis, Missouri, where he was taught to play racquetball by his mother, Goldie. He graduated from Ladue Horton Watkins High School in 1976. In 1975, Hogan won the United States Racquetball Association Junior Racquetball Championship. While still a teenager, Hogan relocated to San Diego, California, in order to pursue professional racquetball. He eventually attended San Diego State University.

Hogan is credited with revolutionizing the game of racquetball, with a serve that drove the ball as fast as 142 miles per hour. This speed measurement is a reference to the ball speed after hitting the front wall and then bouncing as it returned. He won the U.S. indoor professional racquetball national championship on five consecutive occasions, between 1978 and 1982, and won again in 1986. In 1979, Hogan also won the national outdoor (three-wall) championships.

== Professional career and retirement ==
Hogan turned professional and won his first professional racquetball title in Burlington, Vermont, in 1975 defeating Steve Keeley in the finals. He went on to become the first millionaire in the history of racquetball. Hogan was so dominant that he lost only four matches in three years during his prime. He lost only one match in 1977, two matches in 1978, and one match in 1979. Hogan's greatest season was 1979; not only did he win the Pro Racquetball Nationals, but he also won the Outdoor Racquetball Nationals and the Paddleball Nationals.

Hogan is the only player in the history of the sport to win all three titles in one year. He also won a second Paddleball National Championship in 1987. Hogan captured his final national racquetball championship in 1989, retiring the following year.

He returned briefly and won his last professional racquetball title in 1991, 16 years after he won his first professional tournament. After retiring from the professional game, Hogan competed in a handful of national amateur events. He won three USRA National Doubles Championships, 1994 25+ with Jeff Conine, 1996 35+ with Steve Trent and 2001 40+ with Dave Peck. Hogan won the US Open 35+ Singles Championship in 1996.

== Honors and later career ==
Hogan was named the Professional Racquetball Player of the Year eight times, in 1977, 1978, 1979, 1980, 1981, 1982, 1986 and 1989. Ranked as the number one racquetball player of all time by National Racquetball Magazine, In 1991 he was inducted into the Southern California Jewish Sports Hall of Fame. Hogan was inducted into the USA Racquetball of Fame in 1997. Marty Hogan was inducted into the World Outdoor Racquetball Hall of Fame in 2016.

In 2002, Hogan founded The Legends Racquetball Tour. He won the most victories of any participant in the Legends Tour, winning 14 events. Hogan won the Legends Racquetball Nationals 35+ in 2002 and 2003. Moreover, he won the Legends 45+ National Championship in 2005, and the 2004 US Open Legends Racquetball Championship. In addition, he teamed with Cliff Swain to win the Legends National Doubles Championships in 2004 and 2005.
