= International Racquetball Tour =

- Sport: Racquetball
- Founded: 1991
- Countries: International
- Headquarters: Alexandria, Virginia
- Website: www.irttour.com

The International Racquetball Tour (IRT) is the leading professional racquetball organization for men's competition. It was founded in 1991 and is the successor to previous iterations of the tour by different names. Professional Men's racquetball events have been offered since 1973. Events are played mostly in the USA.

In 2025, Dave Negrete became IRT President for a second time, succeeding Mike Grisz, who had been IRT chief executive officer since January 2019.

Grisz succeeded John Scott, who became chief executive officer in June 2017, when the IRT was taken over by E.J. Promotions Inc. Previously, Jason Mannino, a former pro player, served as IRT President., who succeeded Dave Negrete in 2009. Negrete was Commissioner from 2001 to 2009. Initially, Mannino continued to play on the tour during the 2009–2010 season as well as serve as the IRT's leader, but retired at the end of that season to concentrate on being IRT President.

== Rules of play ==
IRT matches primarily use the rules as set out by USA Racquetball. IRT matches were best of five games to 11 points each beginning in 1981 with each game won by a minimum of two points (e.g., a 12–10 score can end a game, but 11-10 cannot). But in the middle of the 2017–18 season, the IRT changed its match scoring from best of 5 games to 11 points to a best of 3 games with the first 2 games to 15 points and the tie-breaker to 11. Moreover, each of the three games was win by 1 point rather than 2 points, as it was under the previous rule with games to 11 points. The rule came into effect at the start of the 2018 calendar year.

Beginning in the 2010–2011 season, the IRT has changed its service rule so that players get two opportunities to put the ball into play (two serve rule), as in tennis where players are allowed two faults before losing a point. Since the 1990s, the IRT had been using a one serve rule, so a fault serve resulted in an immediate loss of serve.

== Current season ==
=== 2025-26 (Tier 1 and Grand Slam Events) ===
Event	Winner	Runner Up	Semi Finalists	Quarterfinalists	Doubles Champions	Finalists
45th Annual Lewis Drug Pro-Am Sioux Falls, South Dakota, January 30-February 2, 2025	(Canada) Kane Waselenchuk; 15-5, 15–8	(Mexico) Eduardo Portillo	(Bolivia) Conrrado Moscoso (Costa Rica) Andrés Acuña	(United States) Jake Bredenbeck (Mexico) Jaime Martell (Mexico) Jordy Alsonso (Mexico) Javier Mar	(Bolivia) Kadim Carrasco (Bolivia) Conrrado Moscoso; 15-8, 13-15, 11-9	(Mexico) Javier Mar (Mexico) Rodrigo Montoya
2025 Minnesota Hall of Fame Minneapolis, Minnesota, March 6-9, 2025	(Canada) Kane Waselenchuk; 15–7, 12-15, 11-4	(Mexico) Alan Natera	(Costa Rica) Andrés Acuña (Mexico) Rodrigo Montoya	(Argentina) Diego Garcia (United States) David Horn (Mexico) Andree Parrilla (Argentina) Gerson Miranda Martinez	(Mexico) Jordy Alonso (Mexico) Erick Trujillo injury forfeit	(Mexico) Javier Mar (Mexico) Rodrigo Montoya
2025 Papa Nicholas Shamrock Shootout Lombard, Illinois, March 13–16, 2025	(United States) Jake Bredenbeck; 15-11, 15-3	(Mexico) Eduardo Portillo	(Mexico) Andree Parrilla (Mexico) Javier Mar	(Canada) Kane Waselenchuk (Costa Rica) Andrés Acuña (Bolivia) Jhonathan Flores (Canada) Samuel Murray	(Mexico) Javier Mar (Mexico) Rodrigo Montoya; 15-4, 15-7	(Mexico) Andree Parrilla (Mexico) Eduardo Portillo
2025 IRT World Singles and Doubles Highland Park, Colorado, September 4-7, 2025	(Costa Rica) Andrés Acuña; 15-14, 15-6	(Canada) Kane Waselenchuk	(Argentina) Gerson Miranda Martinez (Mexico) Eduardo Portillo	(Mexico) Javier Mar (United States) Adam Manilla (Mexico) Rodrigo Montoya (United States) Jake Bredenbeck		
2025 IRT Track Town Open Eugene, Oregon, September 25–28, 2025	(Canada) Kane Waselenchuk; 11-15, 15-2, 11-2	(United States) Jake Bredenbeck	(Bolivia) Conrrado Moscoso (Chile) Alan Natera	(United States) Adam Manilla (Mexico) Javier Mar (Mexico) Rodrigo Montoya (Costa Rica) Andrés Acuña		
2025 Golden State Open Pleasanton, California, October 8–12, 2025	(Bolivia) Conrrado Moscoso; 13-15, 15-7, 11-5	(Mexico) Rodrigo Montoya	(Mexico) Jordy Alonso (Mexico) Andree Parrilla	(Bolivia) Jhonatan Flores (Mexico) Jaime Martell (Bolivia) Kadim Carrasco (United States) Adam Manilla		
2025 So Cal Open Fullerton, California, December 4–7, 2025	(Bolivia) Conrrado Moscoso; 15-0, 15-11	(Mexico) Andree Parrilla	(Canada) Kane Waselenchuk (Costa Rica) Andrés Acuña	(United States) Thomas Carter (United States) Jake Bredenbeck (Mexico) Eduardo Portillo (Mexico) Javier Mar	(Bolivia) Kadim Carrasco (Bolivia) Conrrado Moscoso; 15-4, 15-12	(Mexico) Javier Mar (Mexico) Rodrigo Montoya
46th Annual Lewis Drug Pro-Am Sioux Falls, South Dakota, January 29-February 1, 2026	(Bolivia) Conrrado Moscoso; 15-9, 15–3	(Canada) Kane Waselenchuk	(United States) Jake Bredenbeck (Mexico) Andree Parrilla	(United States) Adam Manilla (Mexico) Alan Natera (Mexico) Javier Mar (Mexico) Rodrigo Montoya	(Mexico) Andree Parrilla (Mexico) Eduardo Portillo; 15-14, 15-7	(United States) Rocky Carson (United States) Adam Manilla
2026 Minnesota Hall of Fame Minneapolis, Minnesota, February 26-March 1, 2026	(Bolivia) Conrrado Moscoso; 0-15, 15-9, 11–7	(Canada) Kane Waselenchuk	(Mexico) Rodrigo Montoya (Bolivia) Jhonatan Flores	(Mexico) Javier Mar (United States) Adam Manilla (Costa Rica) Andrés Acuña (United States) Jake Bredenbeck	(Mexico) Javier Mar (Mexico) Rodrigo Montoya; 15-9, 15-0	(Bolivia) Kadim Carrasco (Bolivia) Conrrado Moscoso
2026 Papa Nicholas Shamrock Shootout Lombard, Illinois, March 13–16, 2025	(Bolivia) Jhonathan Flores; 12-15, 15-7, 11-8	(United States) Jake Bredenbeck	(United States) Adam Manilla (Canada) Kane Waselenchuk	(Costa Rica) Andrés Acuña (Mexico) Rodrigo Montoya (Mexico) Conrrado Moscoso (Mexico) Eduardo Portillo	(Bolivia) Kadim Carrasco (Bolivia) Conrrado Moscoso; 15-4, 15-7	(Mexico) Javier Mar (Mexico) Rodrigo Montoya
2026 IRT The Players Championship Fountain Valley, California, April 16-19, 2026	(Canada) Kane Waselenchuk; 15-13, 7-15, 11-9	(Bolivia) Conrrado Moscoso	(Bolivia) Jhonathan Flores (Mexico) Rodrigo Montoya	(Chile) Alan Natera (United States) Charlie Pratt (Costa Rica) Andrés Acuña (Mexico) Javier Mar		

=== Season summaries (Tier I and Grand Slam Events) ===
Season	Tournament Wins	US Open winner
2025	(Bolivia) Conrrado Moscoso (4), (Canada) Kane Waselenchuk (4), (Costa Rica) Andrés Acuña, (United States) Jake Bredenbeck, (Bolivia) Jhonathan Flores	-
2024	(Canada) Kane Waselenchuk (4), (Bolivia) Conrrado Moscoso, (Canada) Samuel Murray	-
2023	(Bolivia) Conrrado Moscoso (4), (Mexico) Daniel De La Rosa (3), (United States) Jake Bredenbeck, (Mexico) Rodrigo Montoya, (Mexico) Andree Parrilla	-
2022	(Mexico) Daniel De La Rosa (2), (Bolivia) Conrrado Moscoso (2), (United States) Jake Bredenbeck, (Mexico) Andree Parrilla, (Mexico) Eduardo Portillo, (Canada) Kane Waselenchuk	(Bolivia) Conrrado Moscoso
2021	(Mexico) Daniel De La Rosa (3), (Colombia) Mario Mercado, (Bolivia) Conrrado Moscoso, (Canada) Samuel Murray	(Mexico) Daniel De La Rosa
2019–20	(Canada) Kane Waselenchuk (7), (United States) Rocky Carson, (Mexico) Daniel De La Rosa, (Mexico) Alejandro Landa	(Canada) Kane Waselenchuk
2018–19	(Canada) Kane Waselenchuk (6), (United States) Rocky Carson (1), (Mexico) Alejandro Landa (1), (Bolivia) Conrrado Moscoso (1)	(Canada) Kane Waselenchuk
2017–18	(Canada) Kane Waselenchuk (5), (Mexico) Alejandro Landa (2) (Mexico) Daniel De La Rosa (1), (United States) Charlie Pratt (1), (Colombia) Sebastian Franco (1), (Mexico) Andree Parrilla (1)	(Canada) Kane Waselenchuk
2016–17	(Canada) Kane Waselenchuk (7), (United States) Rocky Carson (1), (Mexico) Daniel De La Rosa (1)	(Canada) Kane Waselenchuk
2015–16	(Canada) Kane Waselenchuk (10), (United States) Rocky Carson (3), (Mexico) Álvaro Beltrán (1)	(Canada) Kane Waselenchuk
2014–15	(Canada) Kane Waselenchuk (10), (United States) Rocky Carson (3), (Mexico) Daniel De La Rosa (1)	(Canada) Kane Waselenchuk
2013–14	(Canada) Kane Waselenchuk (8), (Mexico) Álvaro Beltrán (1), (United States) Rocky Carson (1), (United States) Jose Rojas (1)	(Canada) Kane Waselenchuk
2012–13	(Canada) Kane Waselenchuk (9), (United States) Rocky Carson (3)	(Canada) Kane Waselenchuk
2011–12	(Canada) Kane Waselenchuk (9), (United States) Rocky Carson (1), (United States) Ben Croft (1), (United States) Jose Rojas (1)	(Canada) Kane Waselenchuk
2010–11	(Canada) Kane Waselenchuk (12), (United States) Rocky Carson (1), (United States) Jack Huczek (1)	(Canada) Kane Waselenchuk
2009–10	(Canada) Kane Waselenchuk (8), (United States) Jason Mannino (1)	(Canada) Kane Waselenchuk
2008–09	(Canada) Kane Waselenchuk (10), (United States) Rocky Carson (2), (United States) Jack Huczek (1)	(Canada) Kane Waselenchuk
2007–08	(United States) Rocky Carson (7), (United States) Jack Huczek (6), (United States) Jason Mannino (1)	(United States) Rocky Carson
2006–07	(United States) Jack Huczek (9), (United States) Jason Mannino (3), (United States) Rocky Carson (1)	(United States) Jason Mannino
2005–06	(United States) Jack Huczek (5), (Canada) Kane Waselenchuk (4)	(Canada) Kane Waselenchuk
2004–05	(Canada) Kane Waselenchuk (8), (United States) Cliff Swain (2), (United States) Jack Huczek (2)	(Canada) Kane Waselenchuk
2003–04	(Canada) Kane Waselenchuk (6), (United States) Jack Huczek (3), (United States) Jason Mannino (3), (United States) Rocky Carson (1)	(Canada) Kane Waselenchuk
2002–03	(United States) Jason Mannino (6), (United States) Sudsy Monchik (3), (Canada) Kane Waselenchuk (3) (United States) Jack Huczek (1), (United States) Rocky Carson (1), (United States) Mike Guidry, (United States) John Ellis, (Mexico) Álvaro Beltrán	(United States) Sudsy Monchik
2001–02	(United States) Cliff Swain (4), (United States) Jason Mannino (3), (Canada) Kane Waselenchuk (1) (United States) Jack Huczek (1), (United States) John Ellis (1)	(United States) Cliff Swain
2000–01	(United States) Sudsy Monchik (7), (United States) Cliff Swain (3), (United States) Jason Mannino (2), (United States) John Ellis (1)	(United States) Sudsy Monchik
1999–2000	(United States) Sudsy Monchik (6), (United States) Cliff Swain (4), (United States) Jason Mannino (1), (United States) John Ellis (1)	(United States) Jason Mannino
1998–1999	(United States) Sudsy Monchik (8), (United States) Cliff Swain (2), (United States) Jason Mannino (1), (United States) John Ellis (1)	(United States) Sudsy Monchik
1997–1998	(United States) Cliff Swain (10), (United States) Sudsy Monchik (3), (United States) John Ellis (2), (United States) Andy Roberts (1)	(United States) Cliff Swain
1996–1997	(United States) Sudsy Monchik (7), (United States) Cliff Swain (7), (United States) Andy Roberts (2), (United States) Jason Mannino (1)	(United States) Sudsy Monchik
1995–1996	(United States) Sudsy Monchik (6), (United States) Cliff Swain (5), (United States) Andy Roberts (2), (United States) John Ellis (1), (United States) Drew Kachtik (1)	–
1994–1995	(United States) Cliff Swain (9), (United States) Andy Roberts (3), (United States) Sudsy Monchik (2), (United States) Tim Doyle (2)	–
1993–1994	(United States) Cliff Swain (13), (United States) Sudsy Monchik (1), (United States) Andy Roberts (1), (United States) Tim Doyle (1) (United States) Mike Ray (1), (United States) Drew Kachtik (1), (United States) Jack Newman (1)	–
1992–1993	(United States) Cliff Swain (6), (United States) Ruben Gonzalez (3), (United States) Andy Roberts (3), (United States) Mike Ray (3)	–
1991–1992	(United States) Andy Roberts (3), (United States) Drew Kachtik (2), (United States) Mike Yellen (2), (United States) Mike Ray (1) (United States) Tim Doyle (1), (United States) Marty Hogan (1), (United States) Dan Obremski (1), (United States) Brian Hawkes (1), (United States) Bret Harnett (1)	–
1990–1991	(United States) Andy Roberts (2), (United States) Drew Kachtik (2), (United States) Mike Ray (1) (United States) Tim Doyle (1), (United States) Jack Newman (1), (United States) Dan Obremski (1), (United States) Tim Sweeney (1)	–
1989–1990	(United States) Ruben Gonzalez (1)	–
1988–1989	(United States) Bret Harnett (2), (United States) Mike Ray (1)	–
1987–1988	(United States) Bret Harnett (3), (United States) Ruben Gonzalez (2), (United States) Cliff Swain (2), (United States) Egan Inoue (1)	–
1986–1987	(United States) Bret Harnett (3), (United States) Ed Andrews (2), (United States) Marty Hogan (2) (United States) Cliff Swain (1), (United States) Egan Inoue (1), (United States) Mike Yellen (1)	–
1985–1986	(United States) Marty Hogan (4), (United States) Bret Harnett (4), (United States) Mike Yellen (2), (United States) Gregg Peck (2), (United States) Cliff Swain (1)	–
1984–1985	(United States) Marty Hogan (4), (United States) Mike Yellen (3), (United States) Cliff Swain (1), (United States) Gregg Peck (2), (United States) Jerry Hilecher (1)	–
1983–1984	(United States) Marty Hogan (3), (United States) Mike Yellen (2), (United States) Ed Andrews (1), (United States) Dave Peck (1), (United States) Brett Harnett (1)	–
1982–1983	(United States) Mike Yellen (8), (United States) Marty Hogan (3), (United States) Dave Peck (1), (United States) Brett Harnett (1)	–
1981–1982	(United States) Dave Peck (4), (United States) Marty Hogan (4), (United States) Jerry Hilecher (2), (United States) Brett Harnett (1)	–

Note: The US Open Racquetball Championships began in November 1996. There was no US Open in 2023.

== Rankings at season's end ==
Sources
Position	2021	2022	2023	2024
1	(Mexico) Daniel De La Rosa	(Mexico) Daniel De La Rosa	(United States) Daniel De La Rosa	(Canada) Kane Waselenchuk
2	(Mexico) Alejandro Landa	(Mexico) Andree Parrilla	(Bolivia) Conrrado Moscoso	(Mexico) Rodrigo Montoya
3	(Canada) Samuel Murray	(Bolivia) Conrrado Moscoso	(United States) Jake Bredenbeck	(United States) Adam Manilla
4	(Mexico) Andree Parrilla	(Mexico) Eduardo Portillo	(Mexico) Rodrigo Montoya	(Bolivia) Conrrado Moscoso
5	(Mexico) Eduardo Portillo	(Mexico) Alejandro Landa	(Mexico) Andree Parrilla	(Mexico) Andree Parrilla
6	(Canada) Kane Waselenchuk	(Canada) Samuel Murray	(United States) Adam Manilla	(Costa Rica) Andrés Acuña
7	(Bolivia) Conrrado Moscoso	(United States) Jake Bredenbeck	(Mexico) Eduardo Portillo	(Mexico) Erick Trujillo
8	(United States) Rocky Carson	(Canada) Kane Waselenchuk	(Costa Rica) Andrés Acuña	(Mexico) Alan Natera
9	(United States) Jake Bredenbeck	(United States) Rocky Carson	(Mexico) Alan Natera	(United States) Jake Bredenbeck
10	(Bolivia) Mario Mercado	(Bolivia) Mario Mercado	(Canada) Samuel Murray	(Mexico) Jaime Martell (United States) Thomas Carter

Sources
Position	2015–2016	2016–2017	2017–2018	2018–2019	2019–2020
1	(Canada) Kane Waselenchuk	(Canada) Kane Waselenchuk	(United States) Rocky Carson	(Canada) Kane Waselenchuk	(Canada) Kane Waselenchuk
2	(United States) Rocky Carson	(United States) Rocky Carson	(Canada) Kane Waselenchuk	(United States) Rocky Carson	(Mexico) Alejandro Landa
3	(Mexico) Daniel De La Rosa	(Mexico) Daniel De La Rosa	(Mexico) Alejandro Landa	(Mexico) Alejandro Landa	(United States) Rocky Carson
4	(Mexico) Álvaro Beltrán	(Mexico) Álvaro Beltrán	(Mexico) Daniel De La Rosa	(Mexico) Andree Parrilla	(Mexico) Andree Parrilla
5	(United States) Jose Rojas	(United States) Jose Rojas	(Mexico) Álvaro Beltrán	(Mexico) Álvaro Beltrán	(Mexico) Álvaro Beltrán
6	(United States) Jansen Allen	(United States) Jansen Allen	(Colombia) Sebastian Franco	(Mexico) Daniel De La Rosa	(Mexico) Daniel De La Rosa
7	(United States) Marco Rojas	(United States) Marco Rojas	(Bolivia) Mario Mercado	(Canada) Samuel Murray	(Canada) Samuel Murray
8	(Costa Rica) Felipe Camacho	(Colombia) Sebastian Franco	(Canada) Samuel Murray	(Colombia) Sebastian Franco	(Mexico) Eduardo Portillo
9	(Colombia) Sebastian Franco	(Bolivia) Mario Mercado	(United States) Jansen Allen	(Mexico) Rodrigo Montoya	(Bolivia) Conrrado Moscoso
10	(Bolivia) Mario Mercado	(Mexico) Alejandro Landa	(United States) David Horn	(Colombia) Mario Mercado	(United States) Jake Bredenbeck

Position	2010–2011	2011–2012	2012–2013	2013–2014	2014–2015
1	(Canada) Kane Waselenchuk	(Canada) Kane Waselenchuk	(Canada) Kane Waselenchuk	(Canada) Kane Waselenchuk	(Canada) Kane Waselenchuk
2	(United States) Rocky Carson	(United States) Rocky Carson	(United States) Rocky Carson	(United States) Rocky Carson	(United States) Rocky Carson
3	(United States) Ben Croft	(United States) Jose Rojas	(Mexico) Álvaro Beltrán	(Mexico) Álvaro Beltrán	(Mexico) Álvaro Beltrán
4	(United States) Jack Huczek	(United States) Ben Croft	(United States) Jose Rojas	(United States) Jose Rojas	(Mexico) Daniel De La Rosa
5	(United States) Chris Crowther	(Mexico) Álvaro Beltrán	(United States) Chris Crowther	(Mexico) Daniel De La Rosa	(United States) Jose Rojas
6	(United States) Andy Hawthorne	(United States) Chris Crowther	(United States) Ben Croft	(United States) Chris Crowther	(United States) Ben Croft
7	(United States) Jose Rojas	(United States) Shane Vanderson	(United States) Tony Carson	(United States) Ben Croft	(United States) Jansen Allen
8	(United States) Shane Vanderson	(United States) Andy Hawthorne	(United States) Shane Vanderson	(United States) Jansen Allen	(United States) Marco Rojas
9	(United States) Charlie Pratt	(United States) Tony Carson	(Mexico) Daniel De La Rosa	(United States) Tony Carson	(United States) Charlie Pratt
10	(United States) Anthony Herrera	(United States) Charlie Pratt	(Mexico) Javier Moreno	(United States) Marco Rojas	(United States) Tony Carson

Position	2005–2006	2006–2007	2007–2008	2008–2009	2009–2010
1	(Canada) Kane Waselenchuk	(United States) Jack Huczek	(United States) Rocky Carson	(Canada) Kane Waselenchuk	(Canada) Kane Waselenchuk
2	(United States) Jack Huczek	(United States) Jason Mannino	(United States) Jack Huczek	(United States) Rocky Carson	(United States) Jack Huczek
3	(United States) Cliff Swain	(United States) Rocky Carson	(Mexico) Álvaro Beltrán	(United States) Jack Huczek	(United States) Rocky Carson
4	(Mexico) Álvaro Beltrán	(Mexico) Álvaro Beltrán	(United States) Jason Mannino	(Mexico) Álvaro Beltrán	(United States) Jason Mannino
5	(United States) Jason Mannino	(United States) Shane Vanderson	(United States) Shane Vanderson	(United States) Jason Mannino	(United States) Shane Vanderson
6	(United States) Rocky Carson	(United States) Mitch Williams	(United States) Mitch Williams	(United States) Shane Vanderson	(United States) Ben Croft
7	(United States) Shane Vanderson	(United States) Ben Croft	(United States) Ben Croft	(United States) Mitch Williams	(United States) Chris Crowther
8	(United States) Jason Thoerner	(United States) Chris Crowther	(United States) Chris Crowther	(United States) Ben Croft	(United States) Mitch Williams
9	(United States) Mitch Williams	(United States) Jason Thoerner	(United States) Jason Thoerner	(United States) Chris Crowther	(United States) Andy Hawthorne
10	(United States) Chris Crowther	(United States) Andy Hawthorne	(Mexico) Javier Moreno	(United States) Andy Hawthorne	(United States) Jose Rojas

Position	2000–2001	2001–2002	2002–2003	2003–2004	2004–2005
1	(United States) Sudsy Monchik	(United States) Cliff Swain	(United States) Jason Mannino	(Canada) Kane Waselenchuk	(Canada) Kane Waselenchuk
2	(United States) Cliff Swain	(United States) Jason Mannino	(Canada) Kane Waselenchuk	(United States) Jack Huczek	(United States) Jack Huczek
3	(United States) John Ellis	(United States) John Ellis	(United States) Cliff Swain	(United States) Jason Mannino	(United States) Cliff Swain
4	(United States) Jason Mannino	(Canada) Kane Waselenchuk	(United States) Jack Huczek	(United States) Rocky Carson	(United States) Jason Mannino
5	(United States) Rocky Carson	(United States) Jack Huczek	(Mexico) Álvaro Beltrán	(Mexico) Álvaro Beltrán	(United States) Rocky Carson
6	(Mexico) Álvaro Beltrán	(Mexico) Álvaro Beltrán	(United States) Rocky Carson	(United States) Cliff Swain	(Mexico) Álvaro Beltrán
7	(United States) Derek Robinson	(United States) Rocky Carson	(United States) John Ellis	(United States) Derek Robinson	(United States) Shane Vanderson
8	(United States) Tim Doyle	(United States) Derek Robinson	(United States) Sudsy Monchik	(Canada) Mike Green	(United States) Mike Guidry
9	(United States) Mike Guidry	(United States) Tim Doyle	(United States) Derek Robinson	(United States) Sudsy Monchik	(United States) Derek Robinson
10	(United States) Dan Fowler	(United States) Mike Guidry	(United States) Mike Guidry	(United States) Shane Vanderson	(United States) Josh Tucker

Position	1995–1996	1996–1997	1997–1998	1998–1999	1999–2000
1	(United States) Sudsy Monchik	(United States) Sudsy Monchik	(United States) Cliff Swain	(United States) Sudsy Monchik	(United States) Sudsy Monchik
2	(United States) Cliff Swain	(United States) Cliff Swain	(United States) Sudsy Monchik	(United States) Cliff Swain	(United States) Cliff Swain
3	(United States) Andy Roberts	(United States) Andy Roberts	(United States) John Ellis	(United States) John Ellis	(United States) John Ellis
4	(United States) Mike Ray	(United States) Jason Mannino	(United States) Andy Roberts	(United States) Jason Mannino	(United States) Jason Mannino
5	(United States) John Ellis	(United States) John Ellis	(United States) Jason Mannino	(United States) Mike Guidry	(United States) Tim Doyle
6	(United States) Mike Guidry	(United States) Mike Guidry	(United States) Dan Fowler	(United States) Tim Doyle	(United States) Mike Guidry
7	(United States) Jason Mannino	(United States) Mike Ray	(United States) Mike Guidry	(United States) Derek Robinson	(United States) Rocky Carson
8	(United States) Drew Kachtik	(United States) Drew Kachtik	(United States) Mike Ray	(United States) Adam Karp	(United States) Adam Karp
9	(United States) Tony Jelso	(United States) Woody Clouse	(United States) Kelly Gelhaus	(United States) Andy Roberts	(United States) Derek Robinson
10	(United States) Dan Fowler	(United States) Dan Fowler	(United States) Adam Karp	(United States) Dan Fowler	(United States) Dan Fowler

Position	1990–1991	1991–1992	1992–1993	1993–1994	1994–1995
1	(United States) Mike Ray	(United States) Drew Kachtik	(United States) Cliff Swain	(United States) Cliff Swain	(United States) Cliff Swain
2	(United States) Tim Doyle	(United States) Andy Roberts	(United States) Andy Roberts	(United States) Tim Doyle	(United States) Andy Roberts
3	(United States) Andy Roberts	(United States) Tim Doyle	(United States) Mike Ray	(United States) Andy Roberts	(United States) Tim Doyle
4	(United States) Dan Obremski	(United States) Mike Yellen	(United States) Ruben Gonzalez	(United States) Drew Kachtik	(United States) Mike Guidry
5	(United States) Drew Kachtik	(United States) Mike Ray	(United States) Drew Kachtik	(United States) Mike Guidry	(United States) Drew Kachtik
6	(United States) Egan Inoue	(United States) Dan Obremski	(United States) Tim Doyle	(United States) Mike Ray	(United States) Mike Ray
7	(United States) Ruben Gonzalez	(United States) Jack Newman	(United States) Bret Harnett	(United States) Ruben Gonzalez	(United States) Aaron Katz
8	(United States) Mike Yellen	(United States) Ruben Gonzalez	(United States) Dave Johnson	(United States) Jack Newman	(United States) Sudsy Monchik
9	(United States) Marty Hogan	(United States) Dave Johnson	(United States) Jack Newman	(United States) John Ellis	(United States) John Ellis
10	(United States) Brian Hawkes	(United States) Brian Hawkes	(United States) Mike Guidry	(United States) Woody Clouse	(United States) Woody Clouse

Position	1985–1986	1986–1987	1987–1988	1988–1989	1989–1990
1	(United States) Mike Yellen	(United States) Mike Yellen	(United States) Ruben Gonzalez	(United States) Marty Hogan	(United States) Cliff Swain
2	(United States) Brett Harnett	(United States) Brett Harnett	(United States) Bret Harnett	(United States) Ruben Gonzalez	(United States) Mike Ray
3	(United States) Marty Hogan	(United States) Marty Hogan	(United States) Cliff Swain	(United States) Brett Harnett	
4	(United States) Gregg Peck	(United States) Ed Andrews	(United States) Egan Inoue	(United States) Cliff Swain	
5	(United States) Cliff Swain	(United States) Egan Inoue	(United States) Ed Andrews	(United States) Mike Ray	
6	(United States) Mike Ray	(United States) Cliff Swain	(United States) Marty Hogan	(United States) Mike Yellen	
7	(United States) Dave Peck	(United States) Ruben Gonzalez	(United States) Mike Yellen	(United States) Egan Inoue	
8	(United States) Ruben Gonzalez	(United States) Steve Lerner	(United States) Gregg Peck	(United States) Doug Johnson	
9	(United States) Ed Andrews	(United States) Gregg Peck	(United States) Gerry Price	(United States) Jack Newman / Corey Brysman / Dan Obremski	
10	(United States) Scott Oliver	(United States) Gerry Price	(United States) Mike Ray		

Position	1981–1982	1982–1983	1983–1984	1984–1985
1	(United States) Dave Peck	(United States) Mike Yellen	(United States) Mike Yellen	(United States) Mike Yellen
2	(United States) Marty Hogan	(United States) Marty Hogan	(United States) Marty Hogan	(United States) Marty Hogan
3	(United States) Jerry Hilecher	(United States) Dave Peck	(United States) Dave Peck	(United States) Gregg Peck
4	(United States) Bret Harnett	(United States) Bret Harnett	(United States) Gregg Peck	(United States) Jerry Hilecher
5	(United States) Mike Yellen	(United States) Gregg Peck	(United States) Bret Harnett	(United States) Cliff Swain
6	(United States) Rich Wagner	(United States) Ruben Gonzalez	(United States) Ruben Gonzalez	(United States) Ruben Gonzalez
7	(United States) Craig McCoy	(United States) Jerry Hilecher	(United States) Jerry Hilecher	(United States) Bret Harnett
8	(United States) Don Thomas	(United States) Gerry Price	(United States) Gerry Price	(United States) Gerry Price / Scott Oliver / Dave Peck (tie)
9	(United States) Gregg Peck	(United States) Steve Lerner	(United States) Scott Oliver	
10	(United States) John Egerman	(United States) Rich Wagner	(United States) Ed Andrews	

=== Most seasons in top 10 ===
	Player	Years in Top 10
1.	(United States) Rocky Carson	23
2.	(Canada) Kane Waselenchuk	20
2.	(United States) Cliff Swain	20
4.	(Mexico) Álvaro Beltrán	18
5.	(United States) Jason Mannino	15
6.	(United States) Mike Ray	12
7.	(Mexico) Daniel De La Rosa	11
7.	(United States) Mike Guidry	11
9.	(United States) Shane Vanderson	10
9.	(United States) Mike Yellen	10
9.	(United States) John Ellis	10
9.	(United States) Jack Huczek	10

== Year-end number 1 ==
- Years ended No. 1
1.	Kane Waselenchuk	15
2.	Cliff Swain	6
3.	Sudsy Monchik	5
3.	Mike Yellen	5
5.	Daniel De La Rosa	3
6.	Rocky Carson	2
7.	Ruben Gonzalez	1
7.	Marty Hogan	1
7.	Jack Huczek	1
7.	Drew Katchtik	1
7.	Jason Mannino	1
7.	Dave Peck	1
7.	Mike Ray	1

- 1981–82: (United States) Dave Peck
- 1982–83: (United States) Mike Yellen
- 1983–84: (United States) Mike Yellen (2)
- 1984–85: (United States) Mike Yellen (3)
- 1985–86: (United States) Mike Yellen (4)
- 1986–87: (United States) Mike Yellen (5)
- 1987–88: (United States) Ruben Gonzalez
- 1988–89: (United States) Marty Hogan
- 1989–90: (United States) Cliff Swain
- 1990–91: (United States) Mike Ray
- 1991–92: (United States) Drew Katchtik
- 1992–93: (United States) Cliff Swain (2)
- 1993–94: (United States) Cliff Swain (3)
- 1994–95: (United States) Cliff Swain (4)
- 1995–96: (United States) Sudsy Monchik
- 1996–97: (United States) Sudsy Monchik (2)
- 1997–98: (United States) Cliff Swain (5)
- 1998–99: (United States) Sudsy Monchik (3)
- 1999–2000: (United States) Sudsy Monchik (4)
- 2000–01: (United States) Sudsy Monchik (5)
- 2001–02: (United States) Cliff Swain (6)
- 2002–03: (United States) Jason Mannino
- 2003–04: (Canada) Kane Waselenchuk
- 2004–05: (Canada) Kane Waselenchuk (2)
- 2005–06: (Canada) Kane Waselenchuk (3)
- 2006–07: (United States) Jack Huczek
- 2007–08: (United States) Rocky Carson
- 2008–09: (Canada) Kane Waselenchuk (4)
- 2009–10: (Canada) Kane Waselenchuk (5)
- 2010–11: (Canada) Kane Waselenchuk (6)
- 2011–12: (Canada) Kane Waselenchuk (7)
- 2012–13: (Canada) Kane Waselenchuk (8)
- 2013–14: (Canada) Kane Waselenchuk (9)
- 2014–15: (Canada) Kane Waselenchuk (10)
- 2015–16: (Canada) Kane Waselenchuk (11)
- 2016–17: (Canada) Kane Waselenchuk (12)
- 2017–18: (United States) Rocky Carson (2)
- 2018–19: (Canada) Kane Waselenchuk (13)
- 2019–20: (Canada) Kane Waselenchuk (14)
- 2021: (Mexico) Daniel De La Rosa
- 2022: (Mexico) Daniel De La Rosa (2)
- 2023: (Mexico) Daniel De La Rosa (3)
- 2024: (Canada) Kane Waselenchuk (15)
