= Linus Torvalds =

Finnish and American software engineer (born 1969)

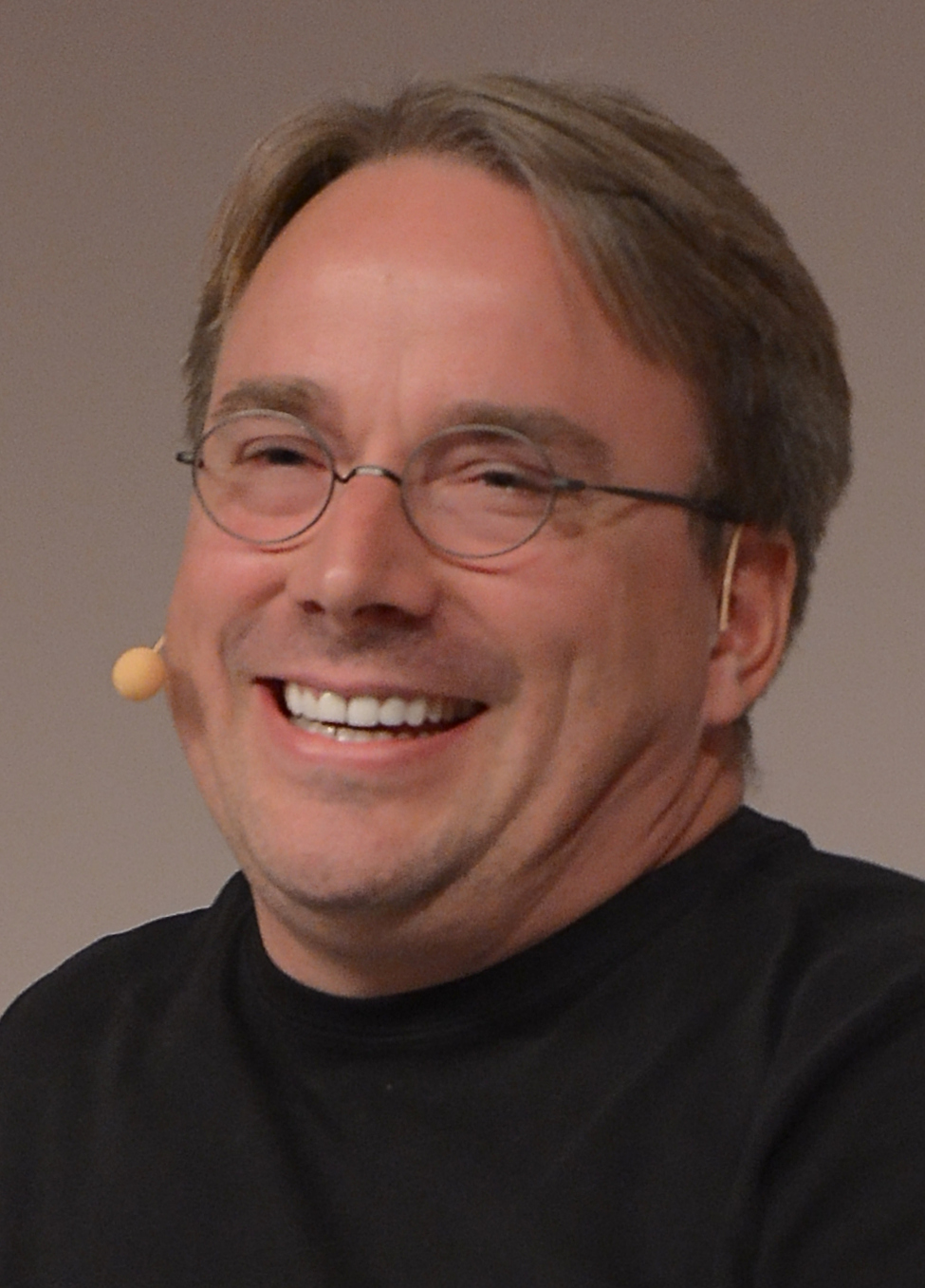
- Torvalds at the LinuxCon Europe 2014
- Born: Linus Benedict Torvalds; 28 December 1969 (age 56); Helsinki, Finland
- Citizenship: Finland; United States
- Education: University of Helsinki (M.S.)
- Occupation: Software engineer
- Employer: Linux Foundation
- Known for: Linux, Git
- Spouse: Tove Torvalds
- Children: 3
- Parents: Nils Torvalds (father); Anna "Mikke" Torvalds (née Törnqvist, mother)
- Relatives: Sara Torvalds (sister); Leo Törnqvist (grandfather); Ole Torvalds (grandfather)
- Linus Torvalds's voice Published in 1994

Linus Benedict Torvalds (Note: /ˈliːnəs ˈtɔːrvɔːldz/ LEE-nəs TOR-vawldz, Finland Swedish: [ˈliːnʉs ˈtuːrvɑlds].) (born 28 December 1969) is a Finnish and American software engineer who is the creator and lead developer of the Linux kernel since 1991. He also created the distributed version control system Git.

Torvalds was one of the recipients of the 2012 Millennium Technology Prize "in recognition of his creation of a new open source operating system for computers leading to the widely used Linux kernel". He is also the recipient of the 2014 IEEE Computer Society Computer Pioneer Award and the 2018 IEEE Masaru Ibuka Consumer Electronics Award.

== Life and career ==
=== Early years ===
Torvalds was born in Helsinki, Finland, on 28 December 1969, the son of journalists Anna and Nils Torvalds, the grandson of statistician Leo Törnqvist and of poet Ole Torvalds, and the great-grandson of journalist and soldier Toivo Karanko. His parents were campus radicals at the University of Helsinki in the 1960s. His family belongs to the Swedish-speaking minority in Finland. He was named after Linus Pauling, the Nobel Prize-winning American chemist, although in the book Rebel Code: Linux and the Open Source Revolution, he is quoted as saying, "I think I was named equally for Linus the Peanuts cartoon character", noting that this made him "half Nobel Prize–winning chemist and half blanket-carrying cartoon character".

His interest in computers began with a VIC-20 at the age of 11 in 1981. He started programming for it in BASIC, later writing machine code directly for the 6502 CPU (rather than using assembly language). He then purchased a Sinclair QL, which he modified extensively, especially its operating system. "Because it was so hard to get software for it in Finland", he wrote his own assembler and "(in addition to Pac-Man graphics libraries)" for the QL, and a few games. He wrote a Pac-Man clone, Cool Man.

Torvalds attended the University of Helsinki from 1988 to 1996, graduating with a master's degree in computer science from the NODES research group. His academic career was interrupted after his first year of study when he joined the Finnish Navy Nyland Brigade in the summer of 1989, selecting the 11-month officer training program to fulfill the mandatory military service of Finland. He gained the rank of second lieutenant, with the role of an artillery observer.

In 1990, Torvalds resumed his university studies, and was exposed to Unix for the first time in the form of a DEC MicroVAX running ULTRIX. Later, he bought computer science professor Andrew Tanenbaum's book Operating Systems: Design and Implementation, in which Tanenbaum describes MINIX, an educational stripped-down version of Unix.

On 5 January 1991 he purchased an Intel 80386-based IBM PC clone before receiving a copy of MINIX, which in turn enabled him to begin work on Linux.

=== Linux ===
The first Linux prototypes were publicly released on the Internet in late 1991 from an FTP server at his university. Version 1.0 was released on 14 March 1994.

Torvalds first encountered the GNU Project in the autumn of 1991 when another Swedish-speaking computer science student, Lars Wirzenius, took him to the Helsinki University of Technology to listen to free-software guru Richard Stallman's speech. Because of the talk and pressure from other contributors, Torvalds would ultimately switch his original license (which forbade commercial use) to Stallman's GNU General Public License version 2 (GPLv2) for his Linux kernel.

After a visit to Transmeta in late 1996, Torvalds accepted a position at the company in California, where he worked from February 1997 to June 2003. He then moved to the Open Source Development Labs, which has since merged with the Free Standards Group to become the Linux Foundation, under whose auspices he continues to work. In June 2004, Torvalds and his family moved to Dunthorpe, Oregon to be closer to the OSDL's headquarters in Beaverton.

From 1997 to 1999, he was involved in 86open, helping select the standard binary format for Linux and Unix. In 1999, he was named by the MIT Technology Review TR100 as one of the world's top 100 innovators under age 35.

In 1999, Red Hat and VA Linux, both leading developers of Linux-based software, presented Torvalds with stock options in gratitude for his creation. That year both companies went public and Torvalds's share value briefly shot up to about US$20 million.

His personal mascot is a penguin nicknamed Tux, which has been widely adopted by the Linux community as the Linux kernel's mascot.

Although Torvalds believes "open source is the only right way to do software", he also has said that he uses the "best tool for the job", even if that includes proprietary software. He was criticized for his use and alleged advocacy of the proprietary BitKeeper software for version control in the Linux kernel. He subsequently wrote a free-software replacement for it called Git.

In 2000, the CEO of Apple Steve Jobs, proposed to Linus to work on macOS, requiring him to stop his work on the Linux kernel. Linus refused, also arguing that the Mach kernel was too different from Linux.

In 2008, Torvalds stated that he used the Fedora Linux distribution because it had fairly good support for the PowerPC processor architecture, which he favored at the time. He confirmed this in a 2012 interview. Torvalds abandoned GNOME for a while after the release of GNOME 3.0, saying, "The developers have apparently decided that it's 'too complicated' to actually do real work on your desktop, and have decided to make it really annoying to do". He then switched to Xfce. In 2013, Torvalds resumed using GNOME, noting that "they have extensions now that are still much too hard to find; but with extensions you can make your desktop look almost as good as it used to look two years ago".

The Linux Foundation currently sponsors Torvalds so he can work full-time on improving Linux.

In 2012, while giving a talk at Aalto University, Torvalds said "fuck you" and raised his middle finger after criticizing the company Nvidia, which specializes in GPU technology. He said Nvidia was, at the time, the single worst company he had dealt with in the development of the kernel. In the talk, he also discussed other elements of computing.

Torvalds is known for vocally disagreeing with other developers on the Linux kernel mailing list. Calling himself a "really unpleasant person", he explained, "I'd like to be a nice person and curse less and encourage people to grow rather than telling them they are idiots. I'm sorry—I tried, it's just not in me." His attitude, which he considers necessary for making his points clear, has drawn criticism from Intel programmer Sage Sharp and systemd developer Lennart Poettering, among others.

On Sunday, 16 September 2018, the Linux kernel Code of Conflict was suddenly replaced by a new Code of Conduct based on the Contributor Covenant. Shortly thereafter, in the release notes for Linux 4.19-rc4, Torvalds apologized for his behavior, calling his personal attacks of the past "unprofessional and uncalled for" and announced a period of "time off" to "get some assistance on how to understand people's emotions and respond appropriately". It soon transpired that these events followed The New Yorker approaching Torvalds with a series of questions critical of his conduct. Following the release of Linux 4.19 on 22 October 2018, Torvalds returned to maintaining the kernel.

In 2024, amidst the Russian invasion of Ukraine, some developers were excluded from the list of Linux kernel maintainers, seemingly over being Russian or using Russian email addresses. Torvalds commented: "I'm Finnish. Did you think I'd be supporting Russian aggression?" Some developers, along with a part of Linux users, noted the lack of public clarity about that move. Later Torvalds claimed that he acted according to government compliance requirements and due to legal issues around Russia.

==== The Linus/Linux connection ====
Initially, Torvalds wanted to call the kernel he developed Freax (a combination of "free", "freak", and the letter X to indicate that it was a Unix-like system), but his friend Ari Lemmke, who administered the FTP server where the kernel was first hosted, named Torvalds's directory linux.

== Authority and trademark ==
As of 2006, approximately 2% of the Linux kernel was written by Torvalds. Despite the thousands who have contributed to it, his percentage is still one of the largest. However, he said in 2012 that his own personal contribution is now mostly merging code written by others, with little programming. He retains the highest authority to decide which new code is incorporated into the standard Linux kernel.

Torvalds holds the Linux trademark and monitors its use, chiefly through the Linux Mark Institute.

== Other software ==
=== Git ===
On 3 April 2005, Torvalds began development on Git, version control software that later became widely used. Torvalds turned it over to Junio Hamano, who became its head maintainer in mid 2005.

=== Subsurface ===
Subsurface is software for logging and planning scuba dives, which Torvalds began developing in late 2011. It is free and open source software distributed under the terms of the GNU General Public License version 2. Dirk Hohndel became its head maintainer in late 2012.

=== Sparse ===
Sparse is a static analysis tool that flags constructs that are likely to be of interest to kernel developers, such as the mixing of pointers to user and kernel address spaces.

== Personal life ==
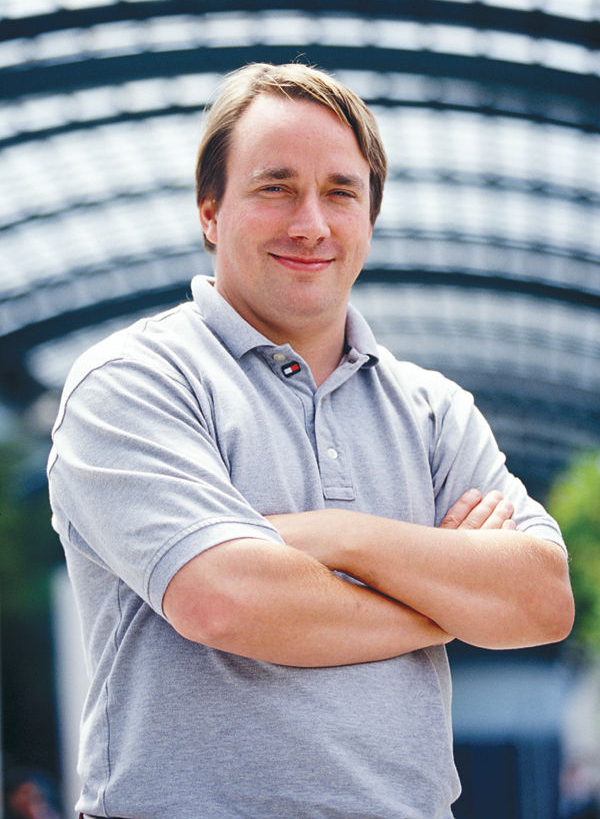
Torvalds in 2002

Linus Torvalds is married to Tove Torvalds (née Monni), a six-time Finnish national karate champion, whom he met in late 1993. He was running introductory computer laboratory exercises for students and instructed the course attendees to send him an e-mail as a test, to which Tove responded with an e-mail asking for a date. They were later married and have three daughters, two of whom were born in the United States. The Linux kernel's reboot system call accepts their dates of birth (written in hexadecimal) as magic values.

Torvalds has described himself as "completely a-religious—atheist", adding, "I find that people seem to think religion brings morals and appreciation of nature. I actually think it detracts from both. It gives people the excuse to say, 'Oh, nature was just created,' and so the act of creation is seen to be something miraculous. I appreciate the fact that, 'Wow, it's incredible that something like this could have happened in the first place.'" He later added that while in Europe religion is mostly a personal issue, in the United States it has become very politicized. When discussing the issue of church and state separation, he said, "Yeah, it's kind of ironic that in many European countries, there is actually a kind of legal binding between the state and the state religion." In "Linus the Liberator", a story about the March LinuxWorld Conference, Torvalds says: "There are like two golden rules in life. One is 'Do unto others as you would want them to do unto you.' For some reason, people associate this with Christianity. I'm not a Christian. I'm agnostic. The other rule is 'Be proud of what you do.'"

In 2004, Torvalds moved with his family from Silicon Valley to Portland, Oregon.

In 2010, Torvalds became a United States citizen and registered to vote in the United States. As of that year, he was unaffiliated with any U.S. political party, saying, "I have way too much personal pride to want to be associated with any of them, quite frankly."

Linus developed an interest in scuba diving in the early 2000s and has achieved numerous certifications, leading him to create the Subsurface project.

== Awards and achievements ==
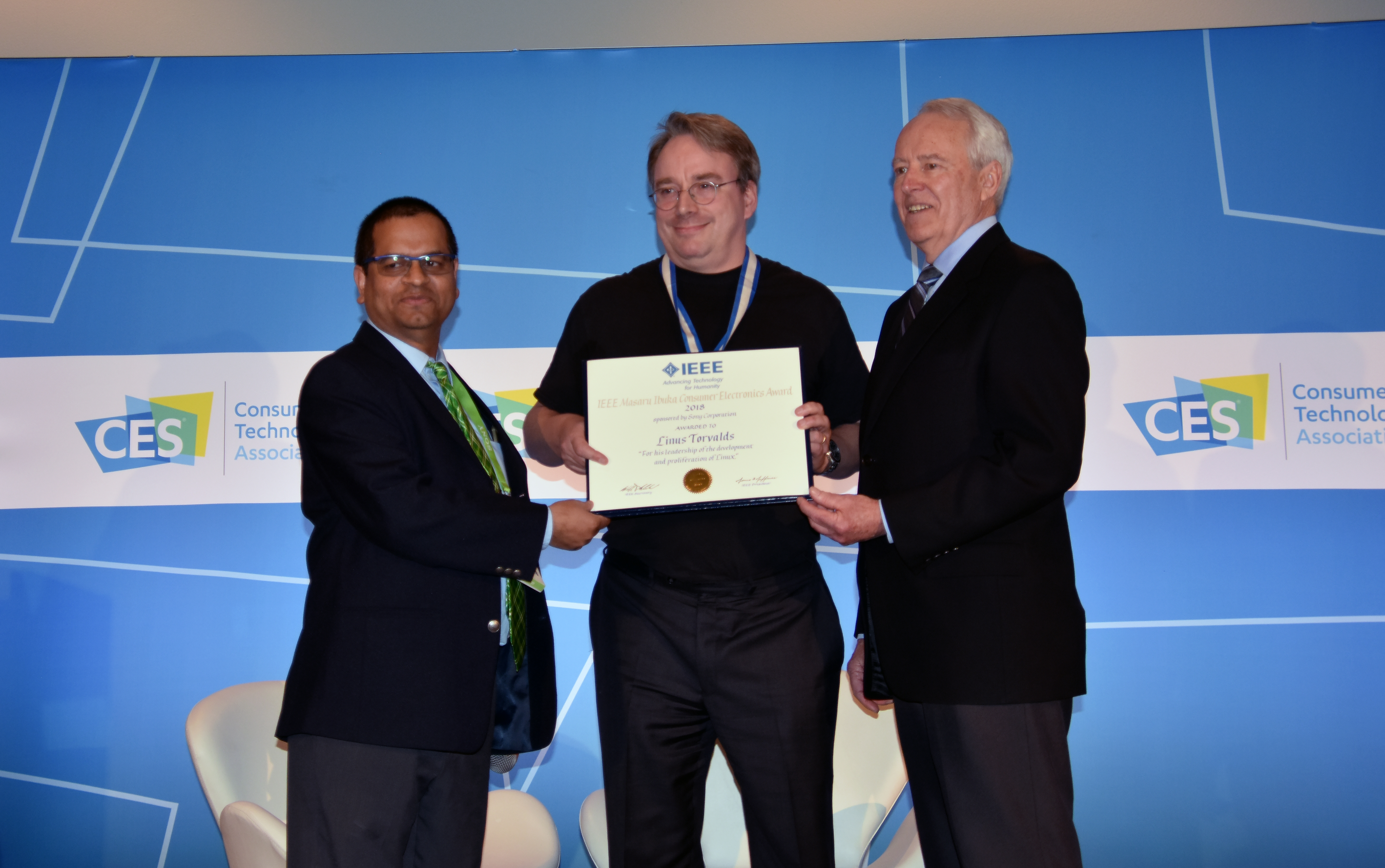
Linus Torvalds (centre) receiving the 2018 IEEE Masaru Ibuka Consumer Electronics Award from ICCE 2018 Conference Chair Saraju Mohanty (left) and IEEE President James A. Jefferies (right) at ICCE 2018 on 12 January 2018 in Las Vegas

Awards and achievements
Year	Award	Notes
2019	Great Immigrants Award	The Carnegie Corporation of New York honored Torvalds.
2018	IEEE Masaru Ibuka Consumer Electronics Award	IEEE Masaru Ibuka Consumer Electronics Award is conferred by the Institute of Electrical and Electronics Engineers for outstanding contributions to consumer electronics technology has been named in honor of the co-founder and honorary chairman of Sony Corporation, Masaru Ibuka. 2018 Ibuka award was conferred to Linus Torvalds "For his leadership of the development and proliferation of Linux."
2014	IEEE Computer Pioneer Award	On 23 April 2014, the Institute of Electrical and Electronics Engineers named Torvalds as the 2014 recipient of the IEEE Computer Society's Computer Pioneer Award. The Computer Pioneer Award was established in 1981 by the IEEE Computer Society Board of Governors to recognize and honor the vision of those whose efforts resulted in the creation and continued vitality of the computer industry. The award is presented to outstanding individuals whose main contribution to the concepts and development of the computer field was made at least 15 years earlier.
2012	Internet Hall of Fame	On 23 April 2012, at Internet Society's Global INET conference in Geneva, Switzerland, Torvalds was one of the inaugural inductees into the Internet Hall of Fame, one of ten in the Innovators category and thirty-three overall inductees.
2012	Millennium Technology Prize	On 20 April 2012, Torvalds was declared one of two winners of that year's Millennium Technology Prize, along with Shinya Yamanaka. The honor is widely described as technology's equivalent of the Nobel Prize.
2010	C&C Prize	He was awarded the C&C Prize by the NEC Corporation in 2010 for "contributions to the advancement of the information technology industry, education, research, and the improvement of our lives".
2008	Hall of Fellows	In 2008, he was inducted into the Hall of Fellows of the Computer History Museum in Mountain View, California, "for the creation of the Linux kernel and the management of open source development of the widely used Linux operating system."
2005	Vollum Award	In August 2005, Torvalds received the Vollum Award from Reed College.
2003	Linus (moon)	In 2003, the asteroid moon Linus (formally known as "(22) Kalliope I") was named partly in honor of him, with its discoverer being an enthusiastic Linux user. The naming proposal was ultimately meant to honor three different Linuses (or Lini) at once: the Thracian, the mythical inventor of melody and rhythm; Van Pelt, a character in the Peanuts comic strip; and Torvalds himself.
2001	Takeda Award	In 2001, he shared the Takeda Award for Social/Economic Well-Being with Richard Stallman and Ken Sakamura.
2000	Lovelace Medal	In 2000, he was awarded the Lovelace Medal from the British Computer Society.
2000	Royal Swedish Academy of Engineering Sciences	In 2000, he was elected as an international representative into the Swedish Royal Swedish Academy of Engineering Sciences.
1998	EFF Pioneer Award	In 1998, Torvalds received an EFF Pioneer Award.
1997	Academic Honors	In 1997, Torvalds received his master's degree (Laudatur Grade) from the Department of Computer Science at the University of Helsinki. Two years later he received honorary doctor status at Stockholm University, and in 2000, he received the same honor from his alma mater. University of Helsinki has named an auditorium after Torvalds and his computer is on display at the Department of Computer Science.
1996	9793 Torvalds (Asteroid)	In 1996, the asteroid 9793 Torvalds was named after him.

== Media recognition ==
Time magazine has recognized Torvalds multiple times:

- In 2000, he was 17th in their Time 100: The Most Important People of the Century poll.
- In 2004, he was named one of the most influential people in the world by Time magazine.
- In 2006, the magazine's Europe edition named him one of the revolutionary heroes of the past 60 years.

InfoWorld presented him with the 2000 Award for Industry Achievement. In 2005, Torvalds appeared as one of "the best managers" in a survey by BusinessWeek. In 2006, Business 2.0 magazine named him one of "10 people who don't matter" because the growth of Linux has shrunk Torvalds's individual impact.

In 2004, viewers of YLE (the Finnish Broadcasting Company) placed Torvalds 16th in the network's 100 Greatest Finns. In 2010, as part of a series called The Britannica Guide to the World's Most Influential People, Torvalds was listed among The 100 Most Influential Inventors of All Time (ISBN 9781615300037).

On 11 October 2017, the Linux company SUSE made a song titled "Linus Said" about the origin of the Linux kernel.

== Bibliography ==
- Torvalds, Linus; Diamond, David (2001). Just for Fun: The Story of an Accidental Revolutionary. New York City, United States: HarperCollins. ISBN 0-06-662072-4.
- Himanen, Pekka (2001). The Hacker Ethic and the Spirit of the Information Age. Random House. ISBN 951-0-25417-7. "Prologue: Linus Torvalds; Epilogue: Manuel Castells"
- Moody, Glyn (2001). Rebel Code: The Inside Story of Linux and the Open Source Revolution. Basic Books. ISBN 0-7382-0670-9
- Nikkanen, Tuula (2000). The Linux story. Satku. ISBN 951-762-990-7.

== See also ==
- Linus's law
- Tanenbaum–Torvalds debate
- List of pioneers in computer science

== Notes ==
Preceded by Michael Grätzel	Millennium Technology Prize winner 2012	Succeeded by Stuart Parkin
