= Steven 'Bo' Keeley =

American adventurer

Steven Bo Keeley is an American adventurer, naturalist, holistic healer, veterinarian, professional athlete, commodity market consultant, garage publisher, and executive tour guide, who in 2000 left civilization for a desert burrow in southern California, then, in 2009, became a world-traveling expatriate.

== Early life ==
Keeley grew up in Idaho and Michigan, and graduated in 1972 with a DVM from Michigan State University (MSU). His father was an electrical and later nuclear engineer, and mother a Welcome Wagon activist as the family moved through fifteen cities in as many years to settle in Jackson, Michigan. Steven Keeley won the Jackson Junior Chess Championship, and, at MSU, multiple intramural sports championships for Farmhouse fraternity to place them first in the all-fraternity competition for the first time in 100 years. After veterinary school he moved to California where a bureaucratic licensing issue caused him to seek a sports career in professional racquetball and paddleball, in which he gained national prominence.

== Athletic career ==
Keeley was one of the top three racquetball players in the world from 1971 to 1976 and in the top ten until 1979, while winning seven NPA National Paddleball Titles. Keeley won the National Paddleball Singles Championship in 1971, 1973, 1974, 1976 and 1977. He captured the National Paddleball Doubles Championship in 1974 with Len Baldori and in 1976 with Andy Homa. Keeley was the second player in history to win a Professional Racquetball Tournament after Steve Serot, when he defeated Charlie Brumfield 21-8, 21-17 in the finals of the NRC Long Beach Pro Am in October 1973.

Keeley won the Canadian National Racquetball Singles Championship in November 1974 defeating Bud Muehleisen in the final. Keeley won his last Professional Racquetball Title in 1980 defeating Marty Hogan 21-5, 21-6 in the finals of the Voight Championship in Los Angeles. During his racquetball career, he defeated every US National Singles Champion from 1968–1982, and every professional champion of his era including ex-housemates Marty Hogan (Racquetball), Charlie Brumfield and Bud Muehleisen, as well as, Bill Schultz, Bill Schmidtke, Craig Finger, Davey Bledsoe and Mike Yellen.

Bo Keeley in his professional racquetball and paddleball years.

He became one of the game's foremost instructors and an author during the 1970s golden era with approximately 100 articles published in Ace, IRA Racquetball, National Racquetball and other trade magazines. In 2002, he refused induction into the USRA Hall of Fame. where incumbent inductees credited him with instructing their games. He was the 2003 racquetball historian and psychologist for the Legends pro tour, and the same year co-invented (with Scott Hirsch) Hybrid Racquetball using a racquetball with wood paddleball paddles.

He wrote what many have called the Bible of the sport, Complete Book of Racquetball (1976, 200,000 sold), and opened racquetball doors in every state, Central and South America with hundreds of clinics and exhibitions, once beating Miss World runner-up with a Converse tennis shoe in a Sports Illustrated exhibition, and others with a seven-inch mini-racquet. Keeley was a stroke and strategy trendsetter, and the first apparel-sponsored pro, flaunting multicolored Converse Chucks tennis shoes. He was featured in Sports Illustrated and other publications as an unusual combination of athlete, intellectual, and 'flake.'

Also a California B-division handball champion, Keeley is the only player to consistently beat handball legend Paul Haber in mano a racqueta exhibitions. He started a silent scholarship fund of personal prize money plus contributions to bring rising East Coast stars to train at the racquetball mecca, Gorham's Sports Center in San Diego, California. In 2007 he was awarded the prestigious NPA Earl Riskey Trophy for contributions to the sport. Inducted into the NPA Hall of Fame in 2014

== Author and publisher ==
Disenchanted toward the end of his career with a faster ball and oversized racquets, Keeley, in 1978, moved to an unheated garage on Lake Lansing, Michigan, in a one year's self-experiment including not blinking for 24-hours, sitting in a homemade sensory deprivation crate, a one-week water fast, reading books upside-down and mirror writing, sleep deprivation, bladder control, induced color blindness, riding a bike for 24-hours, and developing fluent ambidexterity.

He created a small publishing company, Service Press Inc., in the garage foyer and self-published two books in one day, It's a Racquet! and The Kill and Rekill Gang. He has written eight books on sport, travel, and the maverick personality, including the 2011 Keeley's Kures of alternative treatments for common ailments from boxcars, veterinary medicine, and world healers, while carrying on an informal e-mail practice.

== American nomad ==
In the 1980s, Keeley started traveling, leading to many exceptional experiences: He rode a boxcar from Jacksonville, Florida, to New York and borrowed a suit to dine with George Soros at the Four Seasons Restaurant. He railed on 360 freight trains as a "boxcar tourist" through the US, Canada and Mexico, and taught and wrote the textbook Hobo Training Manual for the first college sociology hobo class Hobo Life in America in 1985 at Lansing Community College. The graduating class traveled to Britt, Iowa, for the National Hobo Convention.

During the late 1980s, "just for fun", he drove a Chevy van around the US with an invisible fish-line attached to a waving seven-foot stuffed rabbit riding next to him. Some additional exceptional experiences include:

- playing chess with U.S. open champion Art Bisguier
- playing pingpong with world champ Marty Reisman
- matching wits against three-time Jeopardy! winner Ira Brody
- chatting with Libertarian presidential candidate Harry Browne
- being visited by Entrepreneur of the Year 1989, Stan Mason
- swapping travel tales with Investment Biker Jim Rogers
- hoboing with financial author Doug Casey
- looking through a microscope with DNA discoverer James D. Watson
- living one year in the stairwell of speculator Victor Niederhoffer
- inventing Checkers Proverbs with world champ Tom Wiswell
- flying with Linuxcare pilot-founder Art Tyde
- being mentored under photographer Art Shay
- riding the rails with Hobo King Steam Train Maury Graham.

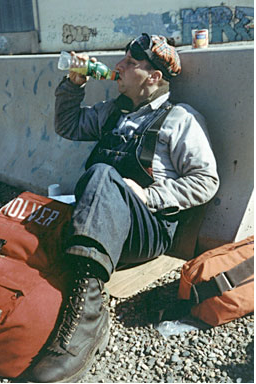
Executive "Pronto" taking a break during Keeley-organized freight hoboing adventure ending 9/11/2001

In 1988 he guided a San Francisco Chronicle journalist to Mount Shasta for a story that won "Bay Area Best Sunday Feature". Later, a 2001 epic along the First transcontinental railroad with four executives ended on 9/11/2001. In 2005 he crossed Canada by rail with South African accountant Tom "Diesel" Dyson, and later that year the pair, disguised as Mexicans, rode atop freights with Central American immigrants through Mexico to the border, where the US Border Patrol apprehended them swimming the Rio Grande with expired Mexican visas.

In the 1980s he was regularly in the National Hobo Association Los Angeles clubhouse and contributed to their Hobo Times newsletter. In 2010, Fort Worth Weekly Peter Gorman's "Renaissance on the Rails" profile won 1st place for the Association of Alternative Newsweeklies best feature of the year.

== Finance ==
In the mid-1990s, Keeley turned to commodities where his financial Low-Life Indicators gathered around the world—such as cigarette butts being shorter in a down market—were seriously considered by Wall Street investors and the press. He espoused his analytical methods at global banking seminars and he rode boxcars to speak on hobo economics at the 1985 Aspen Eris Society and the 1995 New York Junto.

A 1997 13-country tour to identify investment opportunities in emerging markets for speculator Victor Niederhoffer earned millions in Turkey, but in the Black Friday, October 27, 1997, mini-crash losses from buying Thai bank stocks that had fallen heavily in the Asian financial crisis combined with a 554-point single day decline of the Dow Index (the second largest decline to date in index history) forced the company to close its doors for a year, and The New Yorker took a swat at Keeley.

== World traveler ==
Bo Keeley's unconventional life situation has resulted in numerous adventures, several noted in online publications online or in print: For example, Daily Speculations, International Man, Liberty (1987), The Coffee Coaster and Swans Magazine have documented many of his exploits such as:

- Journeying through the Mid-East during the Gulf War
- A knife attack in Caracas resulting in loss of thousands in venture capital
- A four-ft.-wide open mouth hippopotamus entering his Lake Turkana pup tent
- Being held captive at machete point by the Amazon Mayoruna
- Guiding twenty Brazilian evangelists with a penlight from a jungle bus crash
- Chasing rhinoceros horn smugglers after being deputized and armed with a pistol in Namibia
- Being robbed behind the Great Sphinx (and 99 other times around the world)
- Surviving abandonment in the Andes jacketless in winter
- Having 150 close encounters with rattlesnakes
- Petting the head of a Sri Lanka snake charmer's 12-ft. King Cobra

American folk artist Linda Mears features seven of his exploits in Adventure Art (1996). One painting called 'African Safari' where Keeley suffering cerebral malaria was nearly mauled by a lion, is sold as a jigsaw puzzle.

== Iconic individualist ==
Keeley earned a psychology technical degree in 1985 from Lansing Community College, followed by one year of volunteer work in six psychiatric wards and senior living facilities to study the developing mind. Keeley has been called 'one of the greatest individualists in America.' In 2007, he founded Executive Tour Services as a businessmen's Outward Bound on the American rails and hikes to Spanish missions in Baja California.

"My life follows the vicissitudes of Buck the Dog in Jack London's Call of the Wild," he once explained, "From comfortable back yards across America, boxcars on every major railroad, 100+ countries under a backpack, hiking the lengths of Florida, Colorado, Vermont, California, Death Valley, and Baja, Mexico, to finally semi-retire and write my memoirs in a dessert burrow in California." (Long a devotee of grand storyteller Louis L'Amour, Keeley's hikes through the American West also led him to become an ardent fan of celebrated contemporary 'Western' writer Cathy Luchetti and her poignant, realistic portraits of pioneer life—such as Women of the West, Children of the West, Men of the West, and Home on the Range: A culinary history of the American West.)

The burrow lies one mile east of the Chocolate Mountain Aerial Gunnery Range where a 2008 near-miss caved the entry that he shored with old mine timbers. Keeley was the resident advisor to neighbor Phil Garlington's book, Rancho Costa Nada: The Dirt Cheap Homestead. In 2007, he became the first California substitute teacher to be fired for trying to prevent a playground 'skirmish.' He left to ride the rails, and then became an itinerant expatriate writing from select exotic locations including Iquitos, Peru, San Felipe, Baja California, and Lake Toba, Sumatra.

== Books ==
Bo Keeley has written the following books:

- Keeley, Steven, The Complete Book of Racquetball, DBI, 1976, ISBN 0-695-80651-3
- Keeley, It's a Racquet, Service Press Inc., 1978, ISBN 0-931824-02-8
- Keeley, Racquetball Lessons Made Easy, McDonald Pub., 1976 https://web.archive.org/web/20121109205933/https://picasaweb.google.com/bokeely/FotozLinkFcbk#5576430082379748962
- Keeley and Shannon Wright, Women's Book of Racquetball, Contemporary Books, 1980, ISBN 0-8092-7064-1
- Keeley, Stroke Minder Racquetball Flip Book Series, Stroke Minder Pub.,1978
- Keeley and Debbie Ravens, The Kill & Rekill Gang (Cartoon book), Service Press Inc. 1978
- Keeley, Steven Bo, Hobo Training Manual, Burrow Books, 1986.
- Keeley, Steven Bo, Keeley's Kures, Free Man Publishing Co., 2011 (https://www.amazon.com/Keeleys-Kures-Alternative-world-champion-hobo-adventurer/dp/1461077737/)
- Keeley, Steven Bo, Executive Hobo: Riding the American Dream, Free Man Publishing Co., 2011 (https://www.amazon.com/Executive-Hobo-Riding-American-Dream/dp/1463676980/)
- Keeley, Steven, Charlie Brumfield: King of Racquetball, Service Press, 2013.
- Keeley, Steven, Women Racquetball pioneers, Service Press, 2013.
- Keeley, Bo, The Longest Walk Companion: With George Meagon, Service Press, 2013.
- Keeley, Steven Bo, Racquetball's Best: Pros Speak from the Box, Service Press, 2014.
- Keeley, Bo, Stories from Iquitos, Service Press, 2014.
- Keeley, Steven Bo, Greatest Photos Around the World, Service Press, 2014.
- Keeley, Steven Bo, Chess and Sport, Service Press, 2014.
- Keeley, Steven Bo, Book of Bo: Gems of My Life, Service Press, 2015.
- Keeley, Steven Bo, Book of Bo: More Gems of My Life, Service Press, 2015.
- Keeley, Steven Bo, James Hydrick in Photos, Service Press, 2015.
- Keeley, Bo, Hobo Moments: 30 Years in Pictures, Service Press, 2015.
- Keeley, Steven, Advanced Racquetball, Service Press, 2015.
- Keeley, Steven Bo, Bill Schultz: Ringmaster of Sport, Service Press, 2016.
- Keeley, Steven Bo, Elvis' Humor: Girls, Guns & Guitars, Service Press, 2016.
- Keeley, Steven Bo, Slab City: Tales from an Outlaw Town, Slab Press, 2017.

== Notes ==
The following show some of the primary online publication sources for much of Bo Keeley's literary output:

- Daily Speculations stories by Keeley http://www.dailyspeculations.com/wordpress/?cat=205
- Swans Commentary articles by Keeley http://www.swans.com/main.shtml
- International Man posts by Keeley http://internationalman.com/corr-bokeely.php
- Coffee Coaster Guest Columns by Keeley
  - http://www.brianrwright.com/Coffee_Coaster/06_Guest/2010/100526_Taxpayer_Keely.htm
  - http://www.brianrwright.com/Coffee_Coaster/06_Guest/2011/110221_Bo_Kures_1.html
- 'Memoirs',100 early stories at Daily Speculations http://www.dailyspeculations.com/keeley/hobo_index.html
- Northbank Fred, 'Stories from Steve Keeley' http://northbankfred.com/stories.html
- Keeley, 'Stories' http://bokeelytours.com/
