= Bea Knecht =

Swiss internet entrepreneur

Bea Knecht (born 1967) is a Swiss computer scientist, entrepreneur, and founder of Zattoo.

== Life ==
Knecht was born in 1967 in Brugg, Switzerland.

She grew up in Windisch and studied computer science at University of California, Berkeley. She completed a master's degree in Business Administrations at the International Institute for Management Development (IMD) in Lausanne. After graduation, she worked in consulting and management, from 1996 to 2001 as an associate partner at McKinsey. As a software developer, Knecht was instrumental in the development of UBS OpenLAN, SAP xRPM and Levanta.

In 2005, Knecht co-founded Zattoo, a Swiss TV streaming service based in Zürich, with Sugih Jamin. In 2012, she stepped down as CEO and is now Vice Chairman of the Board of Directors. Knecht is also the founder and Chairman of the Board of Directors of the startups Genistat, a data science company, and Levuro, an interactive advertising company. As a developer and entrepreneur, she has received various awards and accolades.

Knecht was a member of the Federal Media Commission (EMEK) from 2014 until 2023.

Until 2012, Knecht lived as a man. Since her transition, she has publicly expressed her views on gender issues.

== Awards ==
- 2014: Best of Swiss Web, Honorary Award
- 2014: Digital Lifetime Award from IAB Switzerland Association
- 2020: Emmy Award in Technology and Engineering
