= Levanta =

Levanta (previously Linuxcare) was a company based in San Mateo, California, United States, that created products for Linux management and data virtualization.

== Company history ==
Linuxcare was founded in San Francisco in 1998 by Dave Sifry, Arthur Tyde and Dave LaDuke. The company's initial goal was to be "the 800 number for Linux" and operate 24 hours a day. In the late 1990s, Linux was slowly gaining in popularity as both a desktop and server operating system. A common complaint was that Linux was inappropriate in business environments because obtaining support for Linux involved newsgroups, mailing lists, and websites operated by volunteers. Linuxcare intended to hire some of the disparate Linux experts and get them working together to provide reliable support, for which individuals and businesses would pay.

When Dell started to ship desktop computers with Red Hat Linux pre-installed in 1999, they bundled a coupon that allowed a certain number of free support calls to Linuxcare.

Several of the people that Linuxcare eventually hired were developers of well-known open source software projects:

- Rasmus Lerdorf worked on PHP
- Martin Pool worked on Apache
- Rusty Russell worked on ipchains
- Richard Morrell founded SmoothWall
- Andrew Tridgell worked on samba, rsync

These experts were allowed to use company time to develop their projects, and were expected to help with technical support in their areas of expertise.

They also hired a number of people from the open source support community including the Linux Gazette "Answer Guy" (Jim Dennis).

Linuxcare had four divisions: Linuxcare Labs that tested and certified hardware systems for Linux compatibility, Linuxcare University, which provided training, Professional Services which provided consultants to other companies and Research and Development that concentrated on enhancing open source software.

Some of their early training engagements included courses presented to customer technical support and sales engineering staff for SGI, Motorola Computer Products, and others. The training materials were primarily focused around LPI topics and certification (systems administration). Linuxcare was a significant support of the early LPI work and former Linuxcare employees (including Jim Lacey, current president and CEO of LPI who was in charge of Linuxcare University).

In December 1999, Linuxcare acquired Ottawa-based consulting company The Puffin Group and the Italian company Prosa. Linuxcare was preparing for an initial public offering in early 2000, until it fired its CEO Fernand Sarrat and CIO Doug Nassaur. Shortly after, around 33% of the company was laid off. In January 2001, Turbolinux and Linuxcare began discussing a merger, but it was called off in May 2001.

Following the withdrawal of its IPO registration statement, Linuxcare changed direction and began developing Linux-based software. Over the next several years, the company became much smaller, replaced most of its staff and board, relocated to San Mateo, California, received new venture capital investments, and, in 2004, changed its name to Levanta (the name of its flagship software product). As Levanta, the company no longer provided Linux technical support.

Levanta changed from software to hardware product model and in 2005 introduced the Intrepid, the industry's first Linux management appliance, which permitted machine provisioning, change control and limited content management for multiple Linux distributions. The initial Intrepid M offering was followed by the high-availability Intrepid X model, which provided warm-failover capability. Finally the Intrepid M designation was changed to refer only to models using external NAS storage served by a NetApp filer; the model with its own internal storage was then redesignated Intrepid S. The last Intrepid release included monitoring capability for managed machines and the Intrepid itself plus a sophisticated policy engine that permitted on-the-fly rebooting or rebinding of managed machines to new ones from a reserved pool as dictated by policy rules.

Levanta laid off all employees and sold its intellectual property on March 31, 2008.

The rights to the Linuxcare brand were repurchased in 2009, and the company has been reborn as Linuxcare LLC, based in San Francisco.
