= Arthur Tyde =

Arthur Tyde is an American software entrepreneur and private investigator based in San Francisco and SE Asia. He has been an advocate for Open-source software since founding the first Linux Users Group in the San Francisco / Silicon Valley Area. (BALUG). He graduated from Michigan State University with a BA in Telecommunications and Anthropology and was the author of many shoot-em-up style games for Atari consoles, the Commodore 64 and TI-99/4A home computers. Following graduation he jumped freight trains covering most of North America and Canada with Steven 'Bo' Keeley, famous maverick hobo adventurer and speculator.

Tyde settled in San Francisco, California where he started his West Coast career as the Information Systems Director for the Law Offices of Melvin Belli in 1988. He was part of the team that worked on the landmark Exxon and Dow Corning lawsuits. Three years later he teamed up with Melvin Belli's chief investigator to start a boutique detective agency specializing in high tech competitive issues and due diligence for mergers and acquisitions.

He had a significant impact on the computing industry as the original CEO and co-founder of Linuxcare where he recruited some of the most talented developers in open-source software. Linuxcare was the first company to offer commercial / enterprise class support for Linux and open-source software and supported 21 different Linux distributions on nine hardware architectures. Linuxcare held the Dell support contract for Red Hat Linux for many years, negotiating a deal with Dell that effectively substituted the Windows license SKU for a support contract with Linuxcare. In addition, Tyde is credited, through Linuxcare, as the founding sponsor of the Linux Professional Institute, the Free Standards Group, and one of the first platinum members of the OSDL (now the Linux Foundation - where Tyde served as Chief Technology Officer from 2005-2006). Linuxcare was intended to become publicly traded in 2001, led by Credit Suisse First Boston, but market circumstances and the termination of the companies CEO ultimately ended its ambition to go public.

Tyde affiliated with Techzecs LLC as a principal in 2007. Recently, he has led Oracle Corp's Asia Pacific (ASEAN) based Cloud Computing business development practice, served as a consulting Enterprise Architect to Oracle's key customer accounts, and advised APAC based start-up companies. Additionally, Tyde lectures on open source strategies for the enterprise, developing effective sovereign innovation programs, computer security, privacy issues, digital currencies and building start-up companies.

== Current appointments ==
- Program Executive, High Performance Computing, Oracle Corporation (Asia Pacific)
- Board of Directors, Orange & Bronze Software, Philippines
- Board of Advisors, Sputnik Inc., wireless media, San Francisco CA
- Board of Advisors, Stravati Dalian Software Company Ltd, Software Development, Dalian China
- Board of Advisors, Untangle Inc., Open Source Gateway, San Mateo CA
- Board of Advisors, TSKG Linuxworld Korea, Seoul Korea
- Board of Advisors, SingleStep Technologies, enterprise systems management, Seattle WA
- Board of Advisors, Black Duck Software, intellectual property management, Boston MA
