= Cathy Luchetti =

American author (born 1945)

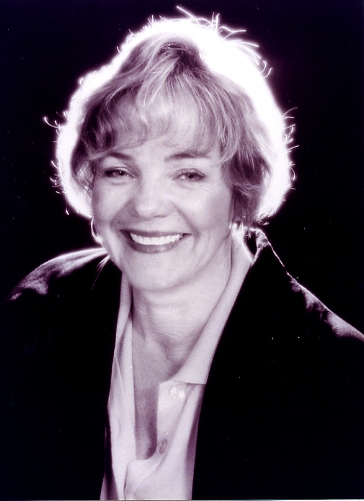

Cathy Colligan Luchetti (born June 1945) is an American author whose photographic history books chronicle the American frontier through the stories of pioneer men, women, evangelists, as well as through themes of courtship, love, marriage, cooking, and children. The books are among the first to examine history through the voices of unsung overland travelers as well as through first person accounts by minorities. She is a winner of the Pacific Northwest Booksellers Association Award for Literary Excellence, the James Beard Award for Best Writing on American Food History, runner-up for the Willa Literary Award for Non-Fiction, winner of Gourmand World Cookbook Award, Perigueux, France, 1998, and the Los Angeles Times Best Books of 2001 designation. Luchetti's books generally have Western themes but she also writes about cooking, human affairs, and animals.

== Early life ==
Luchetti (Colligan) grew up in Midland, Texas, the older of two children. Her father was an oil exploration geologist in the boom years of the Texas Permian Basin, and her mother taught math. After moving to Utah the family took frequent wilderness trips, which is where she became interested in discovering and telling more of the immense story of the American West. She graduated from the University of Utah with a BA in English in 1975. Ms Luchetti’s Old West ancestry is a factor in her lifelong interest in American frontier life. A great-great grandfather Frederick Waymire was an American farmer and politician who served in the Oregon Territorial Legislature and was a member of the Oregon Constitutional Convention, 1857. Waymire represented the farming contingent at the convention and was characterized as a “sort of Far West David Crockett.” Her maternal great-great-great grandfather, Henry Walker Crabb, was the second vintner in California's Napa Valley, a gold-seeker who came to California in the 1850s and who in 1874 founded the ToKalon vineyard—located between Yountville and St. Helena. Crabb had brought cuttings of “noble varietals” from France including Black Burgundy, similar to the Refosco of northern Italy.

== Travel and adventure sources ==
After college she served two years in the Peace Corps in Colombia, SA, working with a cooperative of weavers in Usiacuri, Atlantico. An interest in mountain trekking led to climbing Mount Kilimanjaro, Tanzania, to Uhuru Peak (5895 m.), and Pokalde Peak, Nepal, (5807 m.) as well as trekking Peru's Inca Trail to Macchu Piccu, the Cordillera Blanca, and the remote Huayhuash Circuit. She also trekked the Annapurna Circuit, as well as the Cho La Pass and Gokyo Ri Pass in Nepal. In Peru’s Amazon she collected frogs with Bora Indians, guide Richard Aukoo Fowler, and jungle traveler Steven 'Bo' Keeley. She belongs to a desert hiking group, the Desert Survivors, and has hiked extensively in Utah’s Grand Staircase–Escalante National Monument, as well as California's Death Valley and Mojave preserves. She has also climbed Mount Whitney and Mount Shasta in California.

== Public appearances ==
Luchetti’s gave two lectures at the National Archives about Home on the Range and I Do! as well as the Library of Congress’ “Books and Beyond” inaugural lecture. She has lectured on C-SPAN and was selected as one of San Francisco’s Library Laureates of 2005. She was invited to Laura Bush's White House Symposium on Women of the West in the Salute to American Authors Series and was honoree at the Sacramento Book Collectors’ Club Anniversary event. After a talk in Denver's Tattered Cover Bookstore, a representative from the National Storytelling Network invited her to be a keynote speaker at its 2002 conference in Denver. She also spoke at “Shooting the West VIII”, sponsored by Humboldt County, NV.

== Media consultant ==
Luchetti consulted and wrote for Hot on the Trail, a Wyler/Rimland production for Ted Turner narrated by Keith Carradine, broadcast nationally on TBS. She acted as a consultant and participating historian in Secrets of the Gold Rush, a la carte productions, PBS, and was author and consultant on frontier marriage customs for The Love Chronicles, A&E Channel. The play, Most Blessed by the Motherlode Stage Company was adapted from I Do!

== Books ==
- Women of the West, Antelope Island Press 1982, Orion Books 1982, W.W. Norton 1992, 2004 (winner of the Pacific Northwest Bookseller’s Award for Literary Excellence)
- Under God’s Spell: Frontier Evangelists, Harcourt Brace 1989
- Home on the Range: A Culinary History of the American West, Villard Books, 1993 (Winner of the James Beard Award for Best Writing on American Food)
- Medicine Women: The Story of Early American Women Doctors, Crown Publishers 1998 (runner up for the Willa Award for Non Fiction)
- I Do! Courtship Love and Marriage on the American Frontier, Crown Publishers 1996
- Mama Says, Inspiration Loyola Press 1999
- Children of the West, W.W. Norton 2001 (winner of the Los Angeles Times Best Books of 2001)
- Men of the West, W.W. Norton 2004
- The Hot Flash Cookbook, Chronicle Books 1997, 2004 (Winner of the International Cookbook Award)
- Skidboot, the Smartest Dog in the World, 2013, epub, Kindle

Sources of review for her books and other work include the Los Angeles Times, The Rocky Mountain News, the Oregon Statesman Journal, the New York Times, the Wild West, and the San Francisco Chronicle.
