= Charlie Brumfield =

American lawyer (1948–2025)

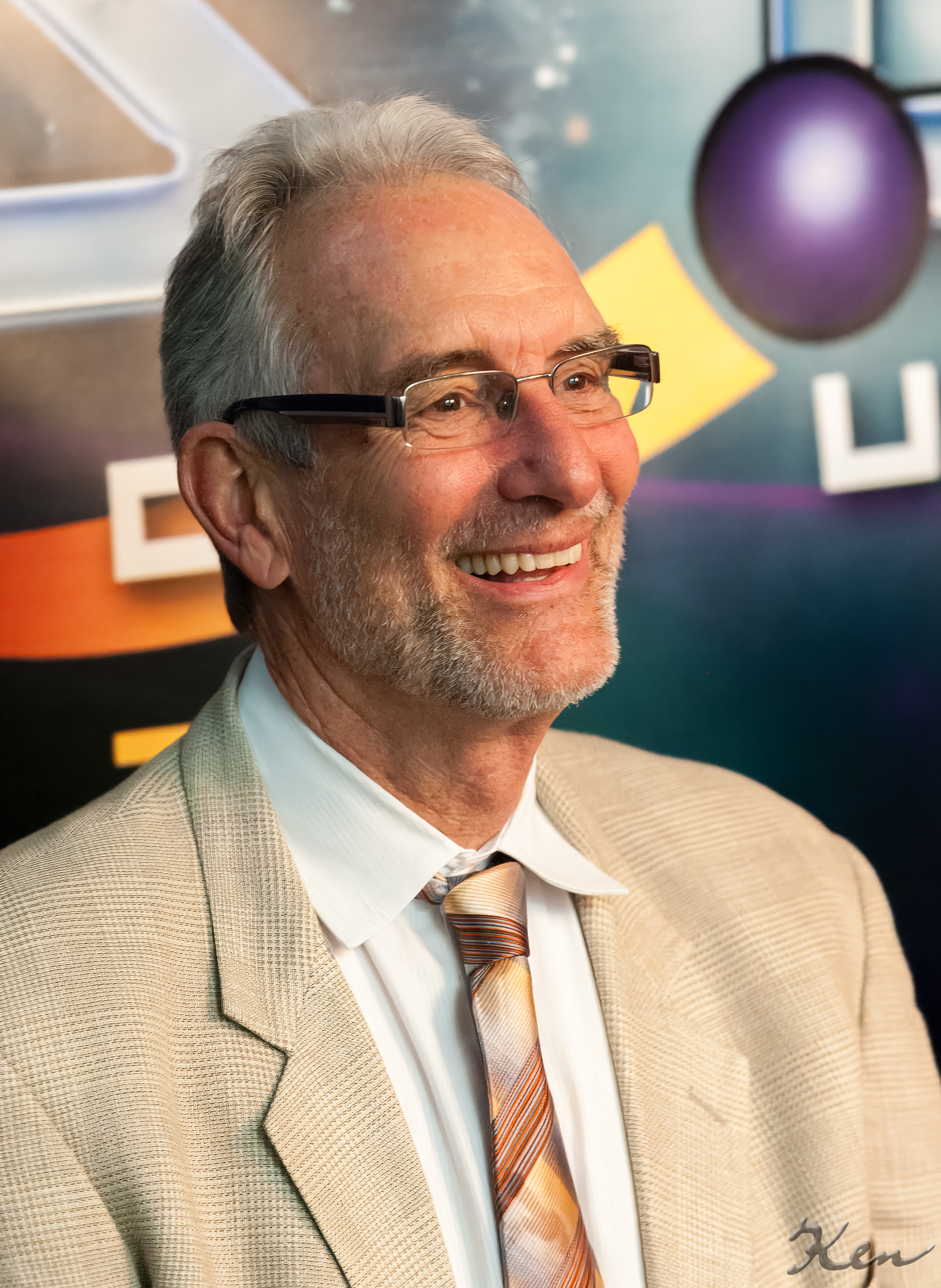
- Brumfield in 2013
- Born: Charles Edgar Brumfield; June 9, 1948; Oceanside, California, U.S.
- Died: June 1, 2025 (aged 76)
- Occupations: Professional Racquetball Player and Attorney
- Awards: USRA Racquetball Hall of Fame Inductee, WOR Outdoor Racquetball Hall of Fame Inductee, NPA Paddleball Hall of Fame Inductee, Earl Riskey Trophy, USRA Lifetime Achievement Award

Charles Edgar Brumfield (June 9, 1948 - June 1, 2025) was an American attorney and former professional racquetball player as well as a noted paddleball player. For much of his professional racquetball career, Brumfield was the marquis player for Leach Industries, the leading manufacturer of racquetball rackets at the time. Leach produced several Brumfield signature rackets including the "Graphite Brumfield". For a brief time, Brumfield had his own sports brand label, BrumStar, which marketed rackets and sports apparel.

Brumfield was the #1 player on the men's professional racquetball tour for most of the 1970s, winning 4 end of year championships and dominating most of the tournaments he participated in. This was a golden age for racquetball, when the sport was one of the fastest growing leisure activities in North America. The names of the top players were well known outside the sport, and the best players could earn large sums of money in endorsements. Steve Keeley ranks Brumfield as the 4th greatest racquetball player of all time, after Cliff Swain, Marty Hogan, and Sudsy Monchik. Brumfield retired from professional racquetball in the early 1980s, settling into a successful career as an attorney in San Diego. Brumfield was also an avid golfer. His son, Conor, who also resides in San Diego, is also an avid golfer, although Conor has largely stayed separate from the racquetball and paddleball communities.

== Early life ==
Charlie was born in Oceanside, CA on June, 9, 1948 to Max and Gloria Brumfield. He was the oldest sibling to sisters Gloria and Kathy. His family moved around due to Max's military service, but Charlie spent most of his later youth in San Diego, where he developed a growing interest in sports along with academics.

Charlie earned his law degree at the University of San Diego School of Law while winning his back-to-back national single titles. He was a competitor in the courtroom as well, practicing law from 1973 until his final days. He was known for his generosity, witty sense of humor, and love of a good story.

== Professional Sports Career ==
Brumfield began as a handball player until a dislocated finger prompted him to take up paddleball in 1964. His play came to the attention of Bud Muehleisen, who was the dominant player in the sport at the time, and the two became lifelong friends. Brumfield won his first National Paddleball Association (NPA) paddleball singles championships in 1969, ending Muehleisen's streak.

Brumfield won back-to-back national racquetball singles championships in 1972 and 1973 (winning 20 consecutive tournaments), then again in 1975 and 1976. He continued playing world class racquetball for the next 10 years. However, the official ball became much faster in the latter part of Brumfield's career, and this did not suit his game style. In 2003, Brumfield's contemporary, Jerry Hilecher, said: "With a slower ball, I don't think anyone would have been able to compete at his level. With a fast ball, he would be one of many close to the top."

Brumfield has also won numerous national racquetball open doubles titles—such as with Muehleisen in 1969.

Brumfield also won the outdoor national racquetball singles championships in 1974 and 1975.

In 1988, Brumfield became the sixth person inducted into the Racquetball Hall of Fame.

Brumfield played occasional exhibition matches with reigning open singles champions including Kelly Gelhaus, Chris Crowther, and Aaron Embry well into his 60s. Steve Keeley described Brumfield as the second best paddleball player of all time (behind Keeley himself), although most followers of paddleball would put Brumfield first. Brumfield was also a member of the NPA Board of Directors for many years, and was the founder of Paddleball Nation, a group of paddleball players in Southern California. Members of Paddleball Nation have won more than half of the paddleball national championships since its inception in 2003. The dominance of Paddleball Nation in national competition was the subject of the lead story, entitled "Racquetball and Brum get credit for success of Paddleball Nation", in the NPA's Fall 2009 newsletter.

Sporting positions
Preceded by Bud Muehleisen	IRA Men's National Racquetball Champion; 1972–1976	Succeeded by Marty Hogan
Preceded by Bud Muehleisen	NPA Men's National Paddleball Champion; 1969–1970	Succeeded by Steve Keeley

== Game style ==
Brumfield was often criticized for psychological play, including delays during the game and intimidating opponents both on and off the court. Immediately prior to his first encounter with Hogan, Brumfield is reported to have hit his opponent with a racket. Hogan described that as "the hardest swing Charlie ever took". Brumfield is alleged to have walked off the court and showered between points when a referee's call went the other way. In June 1974, Sports Illustrated reported that "He has been known to intimidate opponents and referees with rackets, balls, words, gestures and interminable delaying routines when he needs rest." Steve Keeley writes: "He is the omnipresent 'villain' while pestering the foe, ramrodding the ref, and fomenting the crowd. ...I personally have leaped to his physical defense on two events." Suffice it to say that of the four major NPA trophies for paddleball, Brumfield has won all of them except for the Sportsmanship trophy. However, his contributions to both racquetball and paddleball are beyond question, and in 2004, mostly for his work with Paddleball Nation, he was awarded the prestigious Earl Riskey Memorial Trophy for outstanding contributions to the sport of paddleball.

Brumfield drew large and boisterous crowds when he competed at national tournaments, even into his 70s, and remained popular among fans. In a 2009 interview, outdoor racquetball great Tony Gambone was asked "what was the greatest match you ever saw?" He answered: "Every Charlie Brumfield match I have seen."

== See also ==
- List of racquetball players
