= Dave Sifry =

American computer businessman

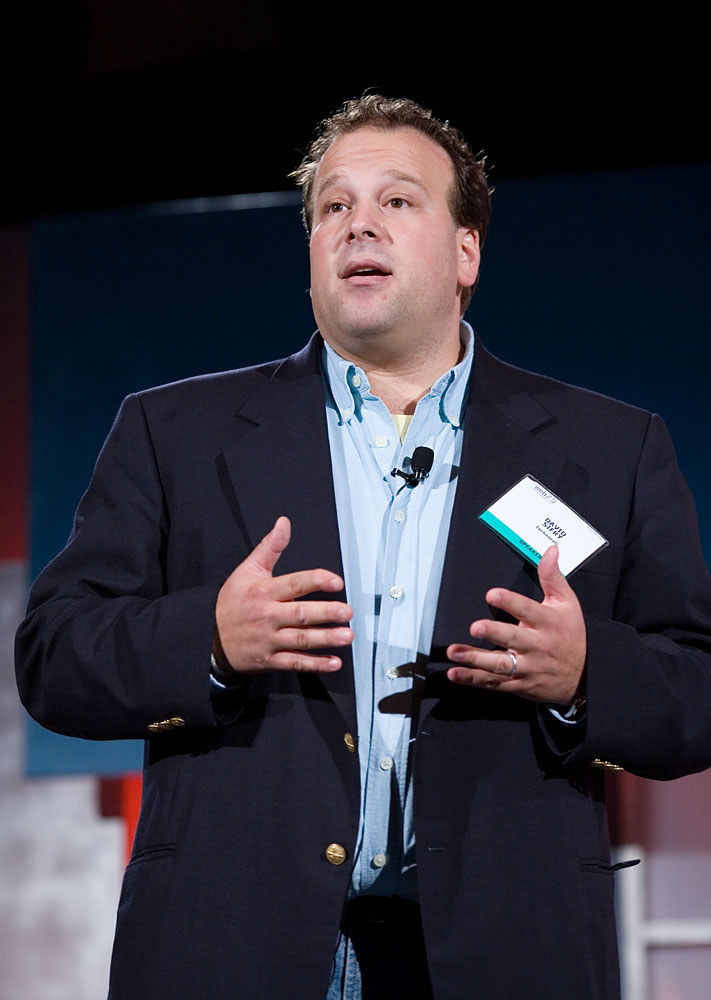
- Dave Sifry at the Web 2.0 Conference, 2005
- Born: 1968 (age 57–58); Long Island, New York
- Education: BS, CS (1991); Johns Hopkins University
- Occupation: Entrepreneur
- Known for: LinuxCare
- Website: www.sifry.com

Dave Sifry is an American software entrepreneur known for founding Technorati, a blog search engine in 2002.. He also lectures widely on wireless technology and policy, weblogs, and open source software.

== Early years ==
Sifry grew up on Long Island, and learned to program on a Commodore PET. While in his teens, he decided that someday he would move to Silicon Valley and start a company. After graduating with a degree in computer science from Johns Hopkins University in 1991, he worked for Mitsubishi in Japan for four years.

== Career ==
Sifry cofounded Linuxcare in 1998 and later founded Sputnik, a Wi-Fi gateway company. In 2008, he founded Offbeat Guides, an online travel guide platform.

He has been a founding member of the board of Linux International, and a technical advisor to the National Cybercrime Training Partnership for law enforcement.

Dave worked as a business developer for Mozilla/Mozillamessaging, trying to bring partners to Mozilla Thunderbird.

== Personal life ==
David is married to Noriko and has three kids, Melody, Noah and Shay. Noah is in his local acappella group at UC Davis, The Liquid Hotplates.

== Awards ==
- 2006 Best Blog Guide – Technorati – Web 2.0 Awards
- 2006 Best of Show – Technorati – SXSW Awards
- 2006 Best Technical Achievement – Technorati – SXSW Awards
