= One wall paddleball =

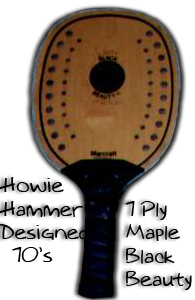
A typical paddleball paddle

One wall paddleball is an American ball game that consists of hitting a small rubber ball against a single wall by using paddles. It can be played in singles (1 versus 1) or in doubles (2 versus 2). The general rule of the game is that the ball must hit the wall without touching the court floor more than once in order to be a valid rally. The balls are usually black, blue, and green. The paddles were originally made of wood, but they are now primarily made of materials such as graphite and titanium.

The game is popular in places where the weather permits outdoor play such as New York, Florida, New Jersey, Connecticut, California and Puerto Rico. Indoor courts, although rare, exist. Tournaments are ruled by the American Paddleball Association.

== History ==
The history of the game is somehow undocumented, but it obviously originates from American handball which consists of hitting the ball with the bare hand or a gloved palm. However, due to the cold weather in northern American states, the players carved wooden paddles to hit with to relieve the pain from the cold. Another form of the game is four wall paddleball.

== Other governing bodies ==
There have been many attempts to package paddleball as a sport. However, attempts to organize it have had mixed results. Founded in 1960, the original U.S. Paddleball Association was the inspiration of doubles champion and founder, Christopher Lecakes, and lasted well into the 1970s. In the late 1960s, the American Paddleball Association (APA) was organized, only to be challenged by the Paddleball Players Association in 1974. In the 1980s, the PPPA, founded by Ray Gaston, became the dominant governing body, and small community-based organizations like the One Wall Paddleball Association founded by Murry "DA K" Kushner continued efforts to push the sport forward. In the early 1990s, the National Paddleball Association, founded by Michael G. Magnaldi, George Medici and Linda Sales, picked up the torch from the prior organizations. The NPA officially ceased operations in early 2006. All prior organizations eventually became inactive. The APA was reorganized in the late 1990s by paddleball legend Howard Hammer and shortly thereafter became inactive again. In 2005, the United States Paddleball Association (USPA) was reborn, this time headed by Henry Marquez and beginning with an authorized revision of Christopher Lecakes' original one wall Paddleball rules. The USPA remains active in overseeing the sport's promotion and application of its original rules.

A number of factors prevent paddleball from becoming more of a national sport, notwithstanding the lack of walls outside of the New York region. Part of the problem stems from the experience in New York City with annual tournaments, which when sponsored by companies such as Budweiser (in the 80s) fell victim to forces on tournament courts that turned away further corporate involvement. Another is the speed of the game, which, barring technological advancement, prevents televising tournaments. The ball moves too fast and the court is too small for following the action during a live game. Without the revenue stream from television, the game is relegated to member fees to enter tournaments which are sponsored locally.

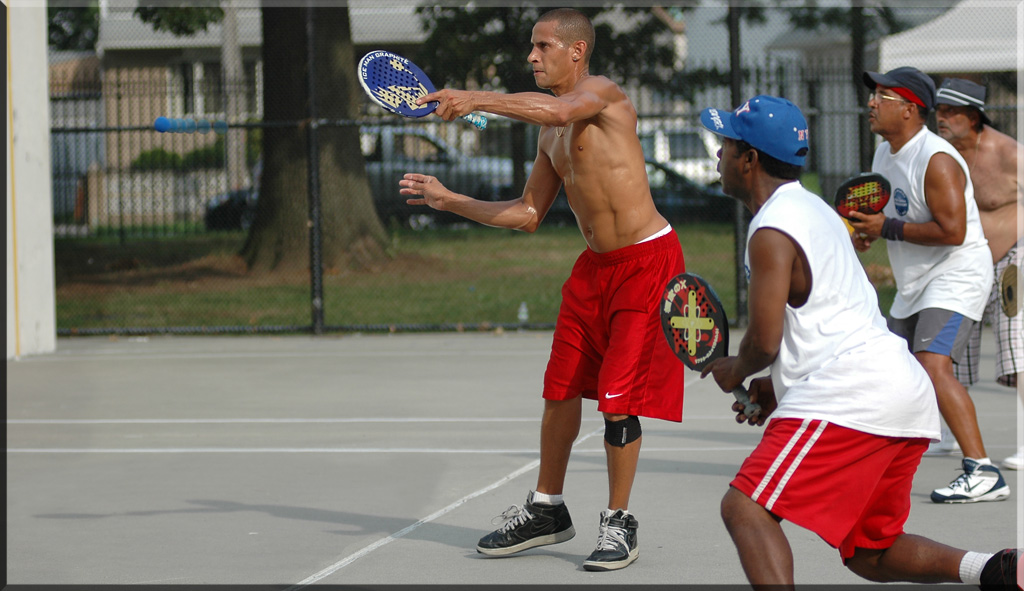
Paddleball game, Roy Wilkins Park, Queens, New York

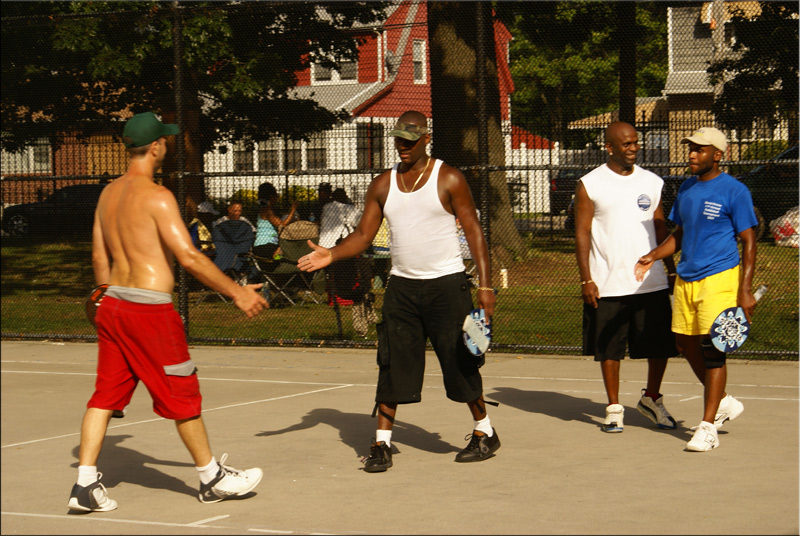
Games end with all players shaking hands.

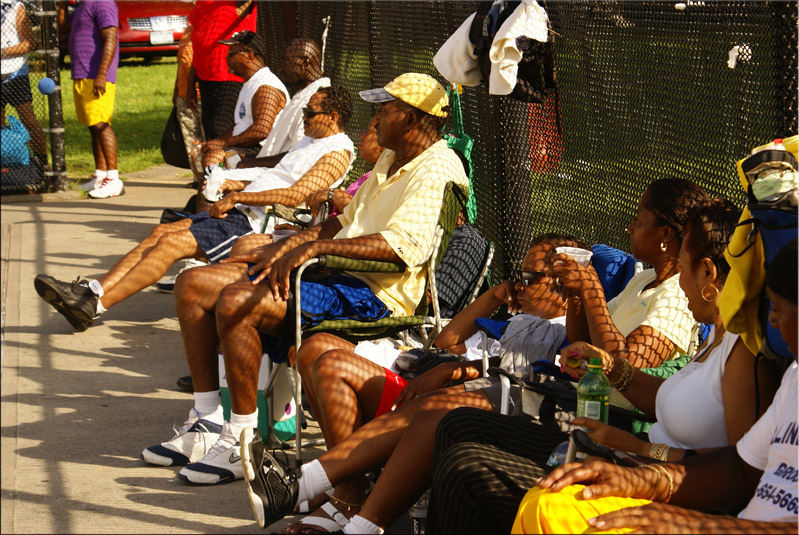
Spectators bring their own chairs and park in the rear. Some wear brims and eyewear for protection from stray balls.
