= Glyn Moody =

British technology writer

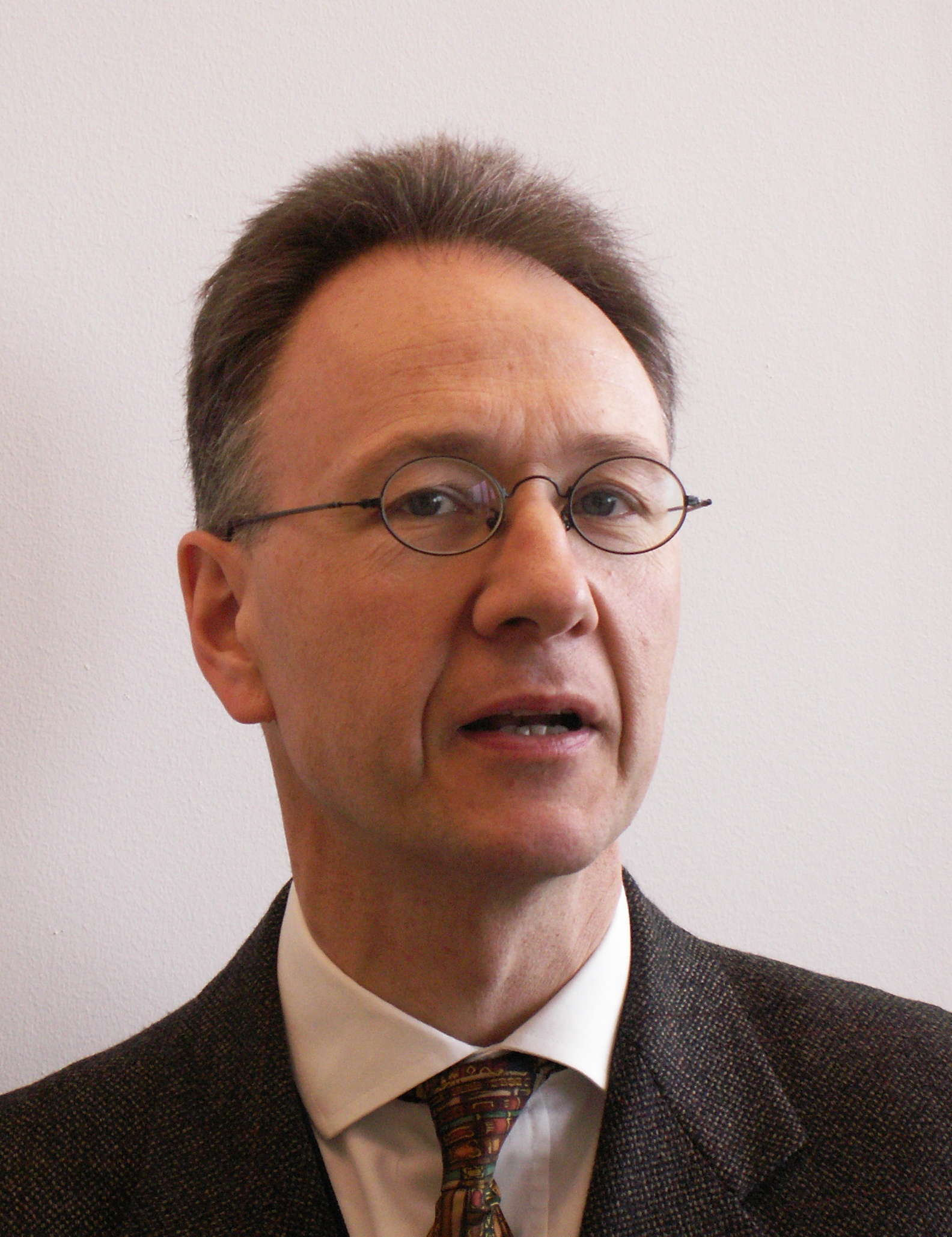
- Moody in 2006
- Occupation: Technology writer
- Glyn Moody's voice recorded November 2012
- Website: opendotdotdot.blogspot.com

Glyn Moody is a London-based technology writer. He is best known for his book Rebel Code: Linux and the Open Source Revolution (2001). It describes the evolution and significance of the free software and open source movements with interviews of hackers.

His writings have appeared in Wired, Computer Weekly, Linux Journal, and Ars Technica. In 2009, he criticised the software education policy of the government of José Luís Rodríguez Zapatero on his blog.

In 2022, he published the book Walled Culture: How Big Content Uses Technology and the Law to Lock Down Culture and Keep Creators Poor, which called for the abolition of copyright.

== Selective bibliography ==
- Walled Culture: How Big Content Uses Technology and the Law to Lock Down Culture and Keep Creators Poor (Paperback or ebook – 2022) ISBN 978-946459849-0
- Digital Code of Life: How Bioinformatics is Revolutionizing Science, Medicine, and Business by Glyn Moody (Hardcover – 3 Feb 2004) ISBN 0-471-32788-3
- Rebel Code: Linux and the Open Source Revolution by Glyn Moody (Paperback – 15 Jul 2002) ISBN 0-7382-0670-9
- The Internet with Windows by Glyn Moody (Paperback – 15 Jan 1996) ISBN 0-7506-9704-0
