= Four wall paddleball =

Court sport invented in the US

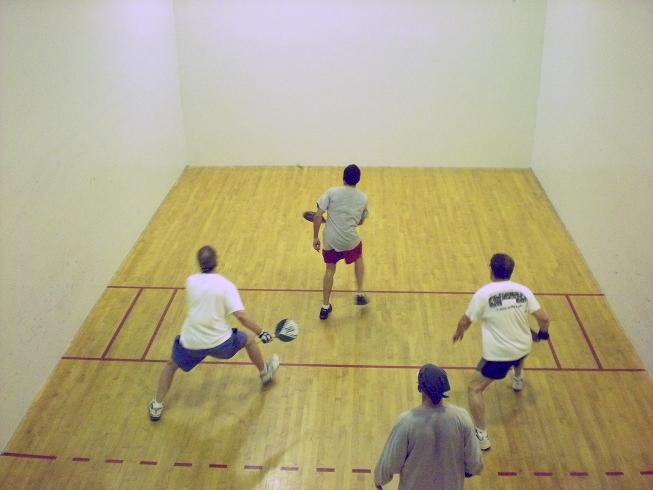
Doubles players jockeying for position; (left to right) Rick Florence, Kirk Loveday, Jim Durst and Clair Steffan (2008). Loveday and Florence were national-caliber players at the time, and Steffan has won Senior Olympic gold medals in paddleball.

Four wall paddleball, or paddleball, is a popular court sport in the Upper Midwest of the United States (particularly in Michigan and Wisconsin), on the West Coast of the U.S. (particularly in southern California) and in the Memphis, Tennessee area. It is played with a paddle and small rubber ball on a standard American handball or racquetball court, with similar rules to those sports.

== History ==
Four wall paddleball was invented in 1930 by Earl Riskey, a physical-education instructor and later Director of Intramural Sports at the University of Michigan. The paddleball trophy, awarded annually to the person who has done the most for the game, bears Riskey's name.

The university's Intramural Sports Building was built with a large number of squash and handball courts, and the school's tennis players often practiced on them during bad weather. Sometimes they used wooden paddles from paddle tennis instead of tennis rackets for their workouts. Riskey thought that a game played with paddles on a handball court might be a good addition to the intramural program. The courts at the Intramural Sports Building in Ann Arbor are still the site for many national championship tournaments.

Other sports (notably paddle tennis) used paddles, but the ball proved more difficult to create. Riskey found that if the fuzzy surface was removed from a tennis ball, the resulting ball had a suitable bounce for the game. Dime-store rubber balls were also used. The choice of ball remains one of the most contentious issues of the sport today. There are standard paddleballs (made by Ektelon), but the sport is also played with a racquetball. This difference changes how the game is played. For instance, when playing with a standard paddleball the ceiling ball is an impractical shot; however, when playing with a racquetball the ceiling ball is the shot of choice.

== The game ==
Paddleball can be played with two players (singles), three players ("cut throat"), or four players (doubles). The rules of paddleball are similar to indoor racquetball, and both sports are played on the same 40-by-20-foot (12.2 by 6.1 m) court. The most-significant differences between paddleball and racquetball are:

- Paddleball players play with a solid paddle, rather than a strung racket.
- A paddleball is slower (and slightly larger) than a racquetball.
- Paddleball games are played to 21 points, instead of 15 or 11 (as in racquetball).

There are other minor differences, but racquetball players tend to pick up the sport quickly and many players are good in both. Marty Hogan, Charlie Brumfield and Bud Muehleisen, for instance, each held national open titles in both sports; Hogan held both national open titles during the same year.

The differences in the paddle and the ball make for longer rallies than in racquetball, and use more of the court. As a consequence paddleball tends to be more physical, and contact between players (while discouraged) occurs more often than in racquetball. Playing the sport at the highest level requires an advanced degree of fitness and endurance, similar to that required by squash.

The official governing organization for paddleball is the National Paddleball Association (NPA), whose website is the official source for current rules and tournament schedules.

== Equipment ==
The official paddleball ball is an unpressurized black ball with a small hole, slightly larger and heavier than a racquetball. Early in the sport's history, many of the better players honed their paddles and guarded their designs. Other players—most notably Bud Muehleisen—started with commercial paddles by Spalding or Marcraft, and modified them to meet their personal preferences. Old tennis rackets could be cut down into paddles, and these "paddle rackets" (as they were called) gave a player such an advantage over a standard wooden paddle that a new game evolved from it.

Competitive paddles are still made in small shops, but the technology has advanced beyond early paddles. Modern paddles combine polymer foams, high-strength metals, graphite and epoxy resin. Paddles are made in home shops by craftsmen such as eight-time national champion Mike Wisniewski of Bay City, Michigan, who builds a few paddles—more than needed for personal use, but not enough to be considered a manufacturer. These "Wiz paddles" are well-enough made that they are often kept on display when not in use. A few small manufacturers (notably Hillbilly Paddles) produce hundreds of paddles per year.

== Related games ==
Several games are similar to four wall paddleball, and some are played on the same court:

- Handball, from which four wall paddleball was derived, is played with both hands and no paddle.
- Racquetball, derived from four wall paddleball, uses a racket tethered to one hand.

Similar games are played on different courts:

- One wall paddleball, using the same type of paddle but played outdoors against a single wall with a different ball.
- Three wall paddleball, using the same type of paddle but played on dedicated outdoor courts with sidewalls coming back to the service line.
- Paddle tennis, using similar paddles and played on a court similar to a tennis court.

Squash is a somewhat-similar game, played with a long-handled racket on a similar (but different-sized) court. The court is shorter and wider, and the ceiling and bottom 19 inches (48 cm) of the front wall are out of bounds. The rules of squash are also different. It is considered a more-defensive game than paddleball, while racquetball is considered more offensive.

== Men's champions ==
Men's US National Singles Champions
Year	Site	Champion	Hometown
1962	Madison, WI	Paul Nelson	Madison, WI
1962	Madison, WI	Paul Nelson	Madison, WI
1963	Madison, WI	Bill Schultz	Madsion, WI
1964	Flint, MI	Paul Nelson	Madison, WI
1965	Ann Arbor, MI	Moby Benedict	Ann Arbor, MI
1966	East Lansing, MI	Bud Muehleisen	San Diego, CA
1967	Bloomington, IN	Paul Lawrence	Ann Arbor, MI
1968	Minneapolis, MN	Bud Muehleisen	San Diego, CA
1969	Ames, IA	Charlie Brumfield	San Diego, CA
1970	Fargo, ND	Charlie Brumfield	San Diego, CA
1971	Flint, MI	Steve Keeley	E. Lansing, MI
1972	Knoxville, TN	Dan McLaughlin	Ann Arbor, MI
1973	Eau Claire, WI	Steve Keeley	East Lansing, MI
1974	Ann Arbor, MI	Steve Keeley	East Lansing, MI
1975	Livonia, MI	Dan McLaughlin	Ann Arbor, MI
1976	Adrian, MI	Steve Keeley	San Diego, CA
1977	E. Lansing, MI	Steve Keeley	San Diego, CA
1978	Ann Arbor, MI	R. P. Valenciano	Flint, MI
1979	Ann Arbor, MI	Marty Hogan	San Diego, CA
1980	Lansing, MI	Dick Jury	Haslette, MI
1981	Ann Arbor, MI	Steve Wilson	Flint, MI
1982	Lansing, MI	Larry Fox	Ann Arbor, MI
1983	Ypsilanti, MI	Steve Wilson	Flint, MI
1984	Lansing, MI	Steve Wilson	Flint, MI
1985	Saginaw, MI	Steve Wilson	Flint, MI
1986	Davison, MI	Mark Kozub	Livonia, MI
1987	Ann Arbor, MI	Marty Hogan	St. Louis, MO
1988	Davison, MI	Andy Kasalo	Calumet City, IL
1989	Ann Arbor, MI	Mike Wisniewski	Bay City, MI
1990	Davison, MI	Mark Kozub	Livonia, MI
1991	Saginaw, MI	Mike Wisniewski	Bay City, MI
1992	Midland, MI	Andy Kasalo	Kalamazoo, MI
1993	East Lansing, MI	Mike Wisniewski	Bay City, MI
1994	Pontiac, MI	Mike Wisniewski	Bay City, MI
1995	Eau Claire, WI	Mark Piechowiak	Bay City, MI
1996	Midland, MI	Mike Wisniewski	Bay City, MI
1997	Midland, MI	Bob Groya	Bay City, MI
1998	Midland, MI	Mike Wisniewski	Bay City, MI
1999	Pontiac, MI	Andy Mitchell	Kalamazoo, MI
2000	Ann Arbor, MI	Andy Mitchell	Kalamazoo, MI
2001	Kalamazoo, MI	Andy Mitchell	Kalamazoo, MI
2002	Livonia, MI	Mike Wisniewski	Bay City, MI
2003	Midland, MI	Mike Wisniewski	Bay City, MI
2004	Ann Arbor, MI	Kelly Gelhaus	Riverside, CA
2005	Ann Arbor, MI	Kelly Gelhaus	Riverside, CA
2006	San Diego, CA	Chris Crowther	Riverside, CA
2007	East Lansing, MI	Kelly Gelhaus	Riverside, CA
2008	San Diego, CA	Aaron Embry	San Diego, CA
2009	Ann Arbor, MI	Cesar Carrillo	Memphis, TN
2010	San Diego, CA	Mike Wisniewski	Bay City, MI

The table below has been sourced from information on the NPA website:

Men's National Open Doubles Champions
Year	Site	Champions and Hometowns
1962	Madison, WI	John Blanchieu and Maurice Rubin (Detroit, MI)
1963	Madison, WI	Bob and Dick McNamara (Minneapolis, MN)
1964	Flint, MI	Bob and Dick McNamara (Minneapolis, MN)
1965	Ann Arbor, MI	Harold Kronenberg and Galen Johnson (Eau Claire, WI)
1966	E.Lansing, MI	Harold Kronenberg and Galen Johnson (Eau Claire, WI)
1967	Bloomington, Ind.	Harold Kronenberg and Galen Johnson (Eau Claire, WI)
1968	Minneapolis, MN	Bud Muehleisen and Charlie Brumfield (San Diego, CA)
1969	Ames, IA	Bud Muehleisen and Charlie Brumfield (San Diego, CA)
1970	Fargo, N.D.	Bob and Bernie McNamara (Minneapolis, MN)
1971	Flint, MI	Craig Finger and Paul Lawrence (Ann Arbor, MI)
1972	Knoxville, TN	Evans Wright and Dan Alder (East Lansing, MI)
1973	Eau Claire, WI	Evans Wright and Dan Alder (East Lansing, MI)
1974	Ann Arbor, MI	Steve Keeley (San Diego, CA) and Len Baldori (East Lansing, MI)
1975	Livonia, MI	Dick Jury (East Lansing, MI) and R.P. Valenciano (Flint, MI)
1976	Flint, MI	Steve Keeley (San Diego, CA) and Andy Homa (Williamston, MI)
1977	Ann Arbor, MI	Dick Jury (Williamston, MI) and R.P. Valenciano (Flint, MI)
1978	Portage, MI	Dick Jury (Williamston, MI) and R.P. Valenciano (Flint, MI)
1979	East Lansing, MI	Dick Jury (Haslett, MI) and R.P. Valenciano (Flint, MI)
1980	Ann Arbor, MI	Bob Sterken (Ann Arbor, MI) and Greg Grambeau (Ann Arbor, MI)
1981	Flint, MI	Andy Kasalo and Andy Mitchell (Kalamazoo, MI)
1982	Kalamazoo, MI	Steve Wilson (Flint, MI) and Kevin McCully (Ann Arbor, MI)
1983.	Midland, MI	Andy Kasalo and Andy Mitchell (Kalamazoo, MI)
1984	Dearborn, MI	Andy Kasalo and Andy Mitchell (Kalamazoo, MI)
1985	Pontiac, MI	Andy Kasalo (Calumet City, IL) and Andy Mitchell (Ft. Wayne, IN)
1986	Dearborn, MI	Andy Kasalo (Calumet City, IL) and Andy Mitchell (Ft. Wayne, IN)
1987	Dearborn, MI	Andy Kasalo (Calumet City, IL) and Andy Mitchell (Kalamazoo, MI)
1988	Portage, MI	Andy Kasalo (Calumet City, IL) and Andy Mitchell (Kalamazoo, MI)
1989	Southgate, MI	Andy Kasalo and Andy Mitchell (Kalamazoo, MI)
1990	Canton, MI	Andy Kasalo and Andy Mitchell (Kalamazoo, MI)
1991	Taylor, MI	Andy Kasalo and Andy Mitchell (Kalamazoo, MI)
1992	Lansing, MI	Andy Kasalo and Andy Mitchell (Kalamazoo, MI)
1993	Eau Claire, WI	Andy Kasalo and Andy Mitchell (Kalamazoo, MI)
1994	Midland, MI	Andy Kasalo and Andy Mitchell (Kalamazoo, MI)
1995	Kalamazoo, MI	Andy Kasalo and Andy Mitchell (Kalamazoo, MI)
1996	Davison, MI	Andy Kasalo and Andy Mitchell (Kalamazoo, MI)
1997	Eau Claire, WI	Andy Kasalo and Andy Mitchell (Kalamazoo, MI)
1998	Davison, MI	Mike Wisniewski (Bay City, MI) and Mike Czabala (Ann Arbor, MI)
1999	Eau Claire, WI	Andy Mitchell and Andy Kasalo (Kalamazoo, MI)
2000	Kalamazoo, MI	Andy Mitchell and Andy Kasalo (Kalamazoo, MI)
2001	Midland, MI	Andy Mitchell and Andy Kasalo (Kalamazoo, MI)
2002	Bloomingdale, IL	Mike Czabala (Los Angeles, CA) and Mike Wisniewski (Bay City, MI)
2003	Eau Claire, WI	Andy Mitchell and Andy Kasalo (Kalamazoo, MI)
2004	Bloomingdale, IL	Kelly Gelhaus and Steve Lerner (Riverside, CA)
2005	Riverside, CA	Kelly Gelhaus and Steve Lerner (Riverside, CA)
2006	Ann Arbor, MI	Kelly Gelhaus and Todd Entriken (Riverside, CA)
2007	Riverside, CA	Kelly Gelhaus and Todd Entriken (Riverside, CA)
2008	East Lansing, MI	Mike Wisniewski and Chad Krager (Bay City, MI)
2009	San Diego, CA	Mike Orr (San Diego, CA) and Todd Entriken (Riverside, CA)
