= Zattoo =

IP-based television distribution platform

Zattoo AG
- Type: Aktiengesellschaft
- Industry: Streaming television
- Founded: 2005
- Founder: Bea Knecht
- Headquarters: Zürich, Switzerland; Berlin, Germany
- Key people: Daniel Mönch (Chairman); Tina Rodriguez (CEO a. i.)
- Number of employees: > 200 (June 2026)
- Website: www.zattoo.com

Zattoo is a TV platform which states that it can be used for IP-based transmission of television channels and video on demand content to different devices. The company headquarters are located in Zurich and it has an additional office in Berlin.

Zattoo states that the business operates in two business areas: TV streaming operations for customers in countries including Germany and Switzerland and also a business to business service which works with telecommunication companies.

== History ==
Zattoo was created to stream the 2006 FIFA World Cup in Germany. On 20 April 2007, Zattoo launched in Denmark with ten channels and started piloting in the United Kingdom. On 4 October 2007, Zattoo reached one million registered users in Europe.

Since June 2015, Zattoo Germany integrates an on-demand TV function, which enables viewers to watch a broadcast up to seven days after their TV broadcast in full length. The UEFA Euro 2016 provided Zattoo with a new user record: a total of 1.8 million viewers watched the games on the OTT platform, more than 800,000 of them in Germany. A quarter of the TV consumption during the Euro 2016 through Zattoo took place using TV sets connected to the internet, further narrowing the gap to smartphone/tablet usage (35%) and web usage (40%).

In December 2016, Zattoo reached two million monthly active users. Zattoo has introduced restart functionality for 50 TV channels for its German customers including channels offered by RTL and ProSiebenSat.1. If a user missed the beginning of a show, they can start the show from the beginning. Zattoo also offers a recording function which enables users to record up to 30 TV shows.

Since January 2018 Zattoo enables cross-border TV streaming for German users within the EU. This means that they can watch German TV programmes while staying temporarily abroad in another EU country. A registration with Zattoo and a PREMIUM account (paid subscription) are required.

Zattoo is also an expert for Programmatic TV. The company offers dynamic advertising insertion (DAI) to advertisers. With DAI it is possible to embed video commercials in the TV live stream.

Chip.de tested German TV streaming service in the following four categories in June 2017: number of channels, picture quality, type of end-user use and range of functions / service. According to Chip.de Zattoo, the best price performance with additional functions such as the break and restart functions is offered.

As of 28 January 2019, Zattoo takes over the end customer business of Magine TV Germany, which is discontinuing its TV streaming service in Germany. 150,000 affected users will receive a welcome offer from Zattoo to continue watching HD TV on all Internet-enabled devices and to use time-shift TV features.

Since October 2020, Zattoo's consumer business has also been available in Austria.

In March 2021, Zattoo announced that it will completely offset its CO_{2} emissions and further reduce its own carbon footprint. This makes Zattoo the first climate-neutral TV streaming provider.

In the run-up to the 2021 European Football Championship (officially UEFA EURO 2020), Zattoo reports that it has reduced the time delay for TV streaming for its own users as well as users of their B2B customers to around 10 seconds on most devices. As a result, the time delay is around 25 seconds less than in comparison to the 2018 World Cup, where measurements showed delays of between 34 and 46 seconds.

== Portfolio ==
=== Zattoo consumer services ===
At one point, the business claimed to have 20 million registered users, which would make it one of the largest TV-streaming providers in Europe, although this data has not been independently verified.

Services offered include Live TV and on-demand content which can be watched by Zattoo subscribers on computers and smartphones (iPhone, Android, Windows 10) and on tablets (iPad, Android, Windows 10).

Zattoo also offers TV applications for televisions with integrated internet connectivity such as the Samsung Smart TV, Xbox One, Amazon Fire TV, Apple TV and Android TV, and also supports streaming via Apple AirPlay and Chromecast. Zattoo claims to include more than 200 TV channels (in Germany, more than 100) featuring public, private and international channels. The Zatoo service also includes replay function and options that are financed either by advertising or by subscriptions.

=== Zattoo B2B ===
In its B2B operations, Zattoo has been offering a hosted and managed OTT and IPTV service for network operators and media companies since 2012. This includes the ingest chain from live TV and Video on Demand content, including encoding, transcoding, multi-DRM and storage through to playout and front-end applications. The company focuses on providing a White Label Product with applications for specific devices including set top boxes, streaming devices and mobile platforms including iOS, Android or Windows 10.

Zattoo intends that their TV as a Service approach can enable network operators and media companies to launch a TV service under their own brand.

== Availability ==
Applications exist for all major mobile platforms and for set-top boxes, video game consoles and connected TVs. Some applications are restricted to specific countries.

=== Countries ===
The service is currently available in Switzerland and Germany. Since October 2020 Zattoo is also available in Austria. Zattoo will grow internationally with its partners in the B2B business.

On 19 December 2009, the Audiovisual Media Services Directive regarding watching TV online from other EU countries came into force. This does not affect Zattoo or other P2PTV providers at all, since the directive only changes the jurisdiction where a country does not allow the reception of a foreign TV channel due to different laws. But the reason why P2PTV channels are not available all over the EU is not that the country of the viewer would not allow it, but that the TV channel itself cannot allow it due to licensing restrictions of the TV programs.

== Awards ==
In June 2017, Chip.de awarded Zattoo Premium with the highest score and the best price-performance ratio in a comparison of five paid streaming services. Zattoo Free was also rated "Excellent" in a list of free streaming services.

In 2020, Zattoo was awarded with the Emmy® Award for Technology and Engineering by the National Academy of Television Arts & Sciences (NATAS). Zattoo won the award in the category "Pioneering Development of Large Scale, Cloud Served, Broadcast Quality, Linear Channel Transmission to Consumers", honoring its pioneering development in the field of mass-market, cloud-based TV transmission technologies.

== See also ==
- IPTV
- Internet television
