= Free Standards Group =

- Abbreviation: FSG
- Successor: Linux Foundation
- Founded: May 8, 2000; 26 years ago
- Dissolved: January 22, 2007; 19 years ago
- Merger of: Open Source Development Labs
- Type: Nonprofit organization
- Purpose: open standards, free software movement
- Location: San Francisco
- Region served: Worldwide

The Free Standards Group was an industry non-profit consortium chartered to primarily specify and drive the adoption of open source standards, founded on May 8, 2000.

All standards developed by the Free Standards Group (FSG) were released under open terms (the GNU Free Documentation License with no cover texts or invariant sections) and test suites, sample implementations and other software were released as free software.

On January 22, 2007, the Free Standards Group and the Open Source Development Labs (OSDL) merged to form The Linux Foundation, narrowing their focus to promoting Linux in competition with Microsoft Windows.

== Work groups ==
FSG was responsible for the following work groups, and transferred responsibility to The Linux Foundation:

- The Linux Standard Base (LSB), a set of interface standards to maintain ultimate portability of applications across various Linux versions and distributions. Conformance with this specification is certified by The Open Group (under contract with the Free Standards Group).
- The Open Internationalization Initiative (OpenI18N), a standard that creates a foundation for language globalization of compliant distributions and applications
- The Linux Assigned Names and Numbers Authority (LANANA)
- OpenPrinting, creating a scalable printing architecture and high-level requirements for a standardized printing system
- Accessibility, developing accessibility standards for free and open source platforms
- Open Cluster, defining a set of clustering interface standards
- The DWARF Debugging Format Standard

== Corporate members ==
- Advanced Micro Devices
- Dell
- Hewlett-Packard
- Intel Corporation
- International Business Machines
- Linuxcare
- Mandriva
- Miracle Linux
- Google
- MontaVista
- Oracle Corporation (Platinum Member)
- Red Hat
- SCO Group
- Sun Microsystems
- Novell (through its acquisition of SUSE)
- Turbolinux
- VA Software

== Not-for-profit members ==
- Japan Linux Association (JLA)
- Linux International (LI)
- Linux Professional Institute (LPI)
- Open Source Development Labs (OSDL)
- PC Open Architecture Developers' Group (OADG)
- Software in the Public Interest (SPI)
- Software Liberty Association of Taiwan (SLAT)
- The Open Group
- USENIX Association

The Free Standards Group also had individual memberships; the board of directors was elected annually by all of the membership.

== See also ==
- Filesystem Hierarchy Standard (FHS)
