= Bud Muehleisen =

American racquetball and paddleball player (1931–2024)

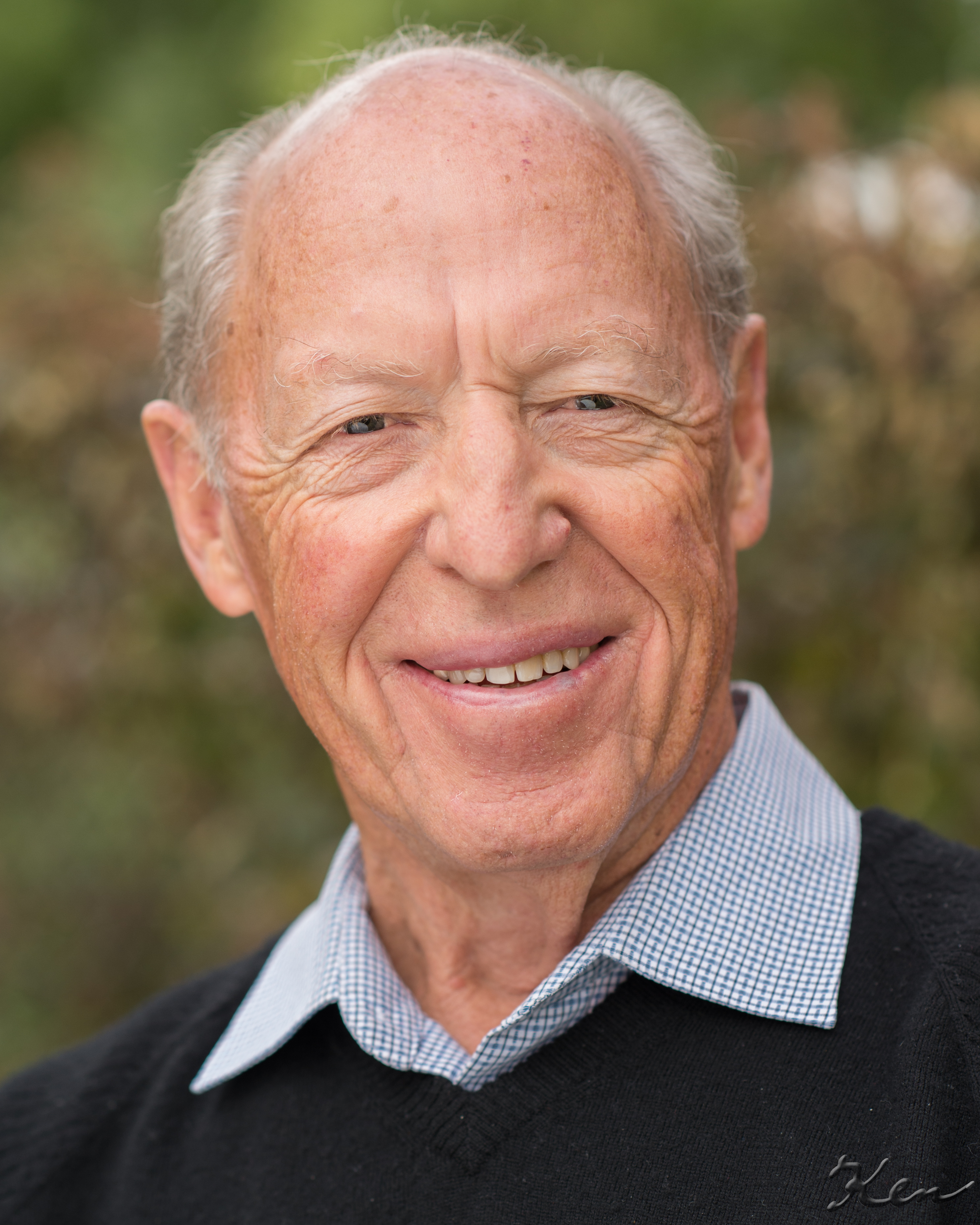
- Muehleisen in 2014
- Born: October 15, 1931; La Mesa, California, U.S.
- Died: September 8, 2024 (aged 92); Fridley, Minnesota, U.S.
- Occupations: Paddleball player, racquetball player, dentist
- Awards: First Inductee into the Racquetball Hall of Fame, San Diego Hall of Champions

Bud Muehleisen (October 15, 1931 – September 8, 2024) was an American dentist, racquetball and paddleball player from San Diego, California. A left-handed player, Muehleisen was part of the first class inducted into the Racquetball Hall of Fame in 1974, only a year after the Hall of Fame was established. He was also inducted into the World Outdoor Racquetball Hall of Fame in 2015. He is considered the best racquetball player and the best paddleball player of the 1960s era, and one of the best finesse players in the history of either game. The description of his career at the Racquetball Hall of Fame reads:

'Dr. Bud' Muehleisen has sometimes been called the most influential man in racquetball. He began playing paddleball in 1962, won four national titles, then took up paddle rackets in 1969, edging out Brumfield to win one of the first national championships in the sport that would become racquetball. Bud served on the IRA board of directors for seven years as the first Rules Committee chairman and was instrumental in the formation of the game's first rules. He won an unprecedented 41 national titles, was a coach and teacher, a regular contributor of instructional material to early magazines and worked with most of the major equipment manufacturers in developing racquets, balls and other products.

Muehleisen's vast collection of age group national titles made him the namesake of USA Racquetball's "Bud Muehleisen Age Group Award" given annually to the nation's best age group racquetball player.

Muehleisen died from a stroke at his home in Fridley, Minnesota, on September 8, 2024, at the age of 92.

== History ==
Tennis was Muehleisen's first racquet sport, and this affected the mechanics of his swing, which exploited the tennis ground stroke for other racquet sports. He also played badminton, and he excelled in paddleball, being virtually impossible to beat for several years. On account of his four national titles, his championship paddle is a permanent trophy in a display kiosk near the racquetball courts at the University of Michigan where the sport of paddleball was born. He dominated the sport for most of the 1960s and his last national paddleball championship came in 1968 after which he was eclipsed by his pupil Charlie Brumfield.

Paddleball was an "amateur" sport emphasizing "gentlemanly conduct". This is reflected in the tradition of self-refereeing matches even in national championships. Muehleisen epitomized the gentleman paddleball player. He always appeared neatly dressed (usually in white when on the court); he was known for being courteous to his opponents, and mild-mannered both on and off the court. A February 7, 1972 Sports Illustrated article about Muehleisen described him as "Mr. Clean" In the same article, Muehleisen described himself as "The White Knight", referring both to his demeanor and his court apparel. That nickname that stuck, and he is still sometimes known by it today.

In 1968, soon after winning his second US Paddleball National Singles Championship, Muehleisen shifted from paddleball to racquetball, and won the IRA national singles championship in 1969 at the age of 37, by narrowly defeating his protégé,Charlie Brumfield. Brumfield has explained that respect for Muehleisen ran so deep that when Muehleisen shifted sports, a large number of other players in Southern California (including Brumfield himself) also made the shift. Though racquetball was somewhat less gentle, Muehleisen extended etiquette to that sport as well, by establishing the official rules for the sport early on. His dedication to the sport brought him a devoted national following, and for many years, he had his own racquetball club (Muehleisen's Courts) in El Cajon, CA, with a dozen finely built concrete wall racquetball courts. He worked with contractors to build courts at other clubs throughout Southern California, and in the late 1970s there were dozens of clubs sporting "Muehleisen-style courts". That expression came to mean a four-walled racquetball court with smoothly plastered concrete walls, a varnished suspended maple floor, and an overhead viewing gallery. Players tend to favor this style of court as the ball bounces more true than with the hollow panel wall courts that are also common. Muehleisen's courts contributed to Southern California's prominence in early racquetball, and while most of those courts have been converted or destroyed over the years, a few still remain in daily use. When a Los Angeles area club re-purposed their Muehleisen-style courts in 2009, they brought Muehleisen back—78 years old at the time—to video tape him taking the last swing on the courts before they were converted for indoor rock climbing.

"Dr. Bud" was instrumental in the establishment of Ektelon, the first major racquetball racket manufacturer (now a subsidiary of Prince Sports and still the leading manufacturer of rackets and accessories). The Ektelon web site reports that in:

1970 - Ektelon makes the first experimental racquetball racquet for Bud Muehleisen, a top competitor and one of the first legends of the sport.

The Ektelon "Bud Muehleisen" model was a round-faced, silver anodized extruded aluminum racket that weighed in at 300 grams, almost twice the weight of a 2010 era racket. Muehleisen's relationship with Ektelon continued for many years and he remained under Ektelon sponsorship through his entire playing career.

In Memphis, in January 1972, Muehleisen played perhaps his most famous match versus Paul Haber then the world champion handball player. Haber played with his hand and Muehleisen with a racket, but the match was played with a handball, which was smaller, faster and harder than a racquetball. The match was played to a standing room only crowd and billed as a contrast in personalities. Sports Illustrated described Haber as "a man who takes a drink or eight, [and] has been known to wink at a girl", characterizing the match as "Mr. Clean versus the Devil" and making the outrageous claim that "There hadn't been anything remotely comparable in, say, a millennium or two, at least not since Spartacus and the slaves made it nets and tridents against swords and shields."

Muehleisen claimed that he had an advantage due to the superior power of the racket. Haber claimed to have the advantage because the ball was best suited to being struck by the hand. Muehleisen won the first game easily, lost the second, and lost a very tight tie-breaker. Video of this match still exists along with Haber's commentary.

Muehleisen and Haber played a second time on September 17, 1972 in Long Beach, California. According to Sports Illustrated, Haber was characteristically late to the court due to a gin rummy game that went into overtime, after which he couldn't find his shoes. Again they split the first two games with Muehleisen winning the first and Haber the second. But this time Muehleisen won the third to take the match, 21-9, 18-21, 21-8.

Racquetball grew tremendously during Muehleisen's era, though it remained a strictly amateur sport during his prime. In its Fall 2009 edition, Racquetball magazine ranked Muehleisen as the "best player never to win a professional tournament" (page 31). When he turned 40, 'Dr. Bud' shifted to age group competition and continued to win national titles in age group divisions through the Golden Master's (55 and over), amassing a total of 41 national championships and numerous international championships. He also won many doubles championships both in age group and open competition, and won open paddleball and outdoor racquetball national doubles championships with Brumfield.

In 1980, Muehleisen was elected to the San Diego Hall of Champions, the premier sports museum in San Diego. In 1994, USA Racquetball, the official organization for amateur racquetball in the United States, established the Bud Muehleisen Age Group Award, which has been given out every year since to the most exceptional racquetball player in age group competition.

In his later years, Dr. Bud continued to practice dentistry in San Diego, but played mostly table tennis instead of racquetball. He was a regular presence at major racquetball events such as the US Open and USA Nationals up until his death.

== See also ==
- List of racquetball players

Sporting positions
Preceded by Bill Schultz	IRA Men's National Racquetball Champion; 1969	Succeeded by Charlie Brumfield
Preceded by Paul Nelson	NPA Men's National Paddleball Champion; 1966–1968	Succeeded by Charlie Brumfield
