= Sacramento Book Collectors Club =

Californian Book Club and Publisher

The Sacramento Book Collectors Club is a book club and publisher based in Sacramento, California. It was founded in 1939 and has been running as a non-profit organisation since 1954. The club houses around 10,00 books, and has published 18 new titles since 1942.

== Publications ==
The general purpose of the Club is to promote interest in the printed word and, from time to time, publish such books, pamphlets and other forms of printing which reflect member interest. Since its first publication in 1942, the Club has published eighteen books, including two incunabulum leaf books and scores of special publications and keepsakes printed by Club members. In its issue of scholarly and popular material, the Club's publications rank as fine printing and at least four of them have received national recognition for outstanding graphics achievements. Its publications, all in limited editions, are regarded as collector's items, and its earlier publications are scarce and demand high prices in bookstores. Most club publications are out of print. The Club also publishes a quarterly newsletter. An archive of Club publications, keepsakes, and meeting minutes is at the California State Library.

The club's collection includes the translations of the Duke of Württemberg, Friedrich Paul Wilhelm, letters written by Alonzo Delano to the San Francisco Free Trader in the early 1850s in reference to the gold rush and English translations of Théophile de Rutté, an early 19th-century settler in San Francisco who was one of the last people to write about the city before a series of fires between 1849 and 1851.

== Meetings ==
The Club meets on the second Friday of the month from September through June, with a summer break in July and August. Meetings, always well attended, are generally held in area community centers or libraries. A program, usually a noted guest speaker who is often also a Club member, precedes refreshments and a short business session. Officers are elected at the annual meeting in January, which also includes a very popular 'show and tell' feature when members bring their special andfavorite collections of books and book art treasures to the meeting and share their interests. Printer members of the Club also print a limited number of beautiful letterpress keepsakes for the occasion. The February meeting celebrates the founding of the club. It is a dinner meeting and features an especially distinguished speaker. Other programs during the year feature authors, publishers, experts on printing, book collecting, California history and the books arts. A potluck supper meeting in June closes the season until regular meetings resume in September. During July and August a tour or outing to a local library, archive or other point of interest may be arranged.

== Membership ==
Membership in the Club is open to anyone interested in books. This might include printing, the book arts, books as collectibles, the history of books, libraries, or the use of the printed word. Members receive monthly meeting notices and a popular quarterly newsletter. Special interests of members vary widely. Collections include Sacramento and California history, Western. Americana, mining, railroading, California medical history, drama, classics in literature, first editions, miniature books, popup books, bookplates, printing, bookbinding, engraving, paper making, typography, illuminated manuscripts, cartography, children's books, science fiction, aviation, and more. Collectors of fine printing own works from such presses as the Allen, Kelmscott, Doves, Grabhorn, and Yolla Bolly Presses, to name a few. Authors whose works are collected include Ansel Adams, Gertrude Atherton, Ernest Hemingway, James Joyce, Jack London, Henry Miller, John Muir, Edgar Allan Poe, Beatrix Potter, Robert Louis Stevenson, John Steinbeck, William Morris, Jack Kerouac, Gertrude Stein, Mark Twain, Henry David Thoreau, Robert Nathan, Willa Cather, L. Frank Baum, and many others.
