= Rebel Code =

Book about free and open-source software

- Author: Glyn Moody
- Language: English
- Published: 2001
- Publisher: Basic Books
- ISBN: 0-7382-0670-9

Rebel Code: Linux and the Open Source Revolution is a technology book by Glyn Moody published in 2001. It describes the evolution and significance of the free software and open source movements with many interviews with notable hackers.

The British journalist Stephen Poole wrote in 2001 that the open source movement might have the effect of reducing the price people are willing to pay for other products. He also highlighted the inconsistency between the free cost of open source and the price the publishers were asking for the book.

Chris Douce wrote in 2001 that the book is an "important addition to the genre of writing that will undoubtedly become termed 'pop-computing'". He also wrote that the book raised interesting questions regarding the relationship between technology and culture, as lot of early design decisions about the Linux kernel were determined by microprocessors.

Sean Jewett wrote in 2001 that "Rebel Code, despite some flaws, is a must read for those using Linux. It helps put into perspective the decisions that were made early on, and sheds light on the revolution to come."
