= Linuxcare =

Linuxcare Bootable Toolbox
- LNX-BBC 2.1 business card media
- Developer: Duncan MacKinnon, Tom Crimi, Seth Schoen, other contributors
- OS family: Linux
- Working state: Discontinued
- Source model: Open source
- Initial release: 1999, 25–26 years ago
- Latest release: 2.1 / May 1, 2003
- Platforms: x86
- Kernel type: Monolithic, Linux 2.4
- Default user interface: Console, Hackedbox
- Official website: Removed, leads to websites without relation to the project.

Linuxcare is an American IT services company founded in San Francisco in 1998 by Dave Sifry, Arthur Tyde and Dave LaDuke. The company's initial goal was to be "the 800 number for Linux" and operate 24 hours a day. Due to the dot-com bubble of the early millennium years, this version of Linuxcare morphed into Levanta and eventually sold in 2008.

== Linuxcare Bootable Toolbox ==
In 1999, Linuxcare developed the Linuxcare Bootable Toolbox, also known as the Linuxcare BBC, or Bootable Business Card. The BBC was a Live CD, a bootable Linux distribution designed to be run entirely from the CD. In 1999, this was a very new concept, and was preceded by only one other Linux distribution designed exclusively to be run from CD, DemoLinux. While DemoLinux was designed to show the whole desktop experience of a Linux distribution, the Linuxcare BBC was designed to be used mainly as a utility CD, and was the first Live CD with this focus.

The BBC distribution was under 50MB, and designed to fit on a mini CD shaped like a standard business card. It included utilities designed to assist system administrators, and was primarily a text console operating system, but a minimal Blackbox X11 UI was included.

Linuxcare produced an initial launch of an unversioned release, pressed as business card CDs, and distributed them at LinuxWorld 1999. Versions 1.2, 1.5 and 1.6 were later released online, and pressed and released at other conventions and Linux user groups from 1999 to 2001.

== LNX-BBC ==
On May 8, 2001, Seth Schoen announced that the original three developers of the Linuxcare Bootable Toolbox had left Linuxcare to fork the project into a new community project, named LNX-BBC. Release 1.6, released in May 2001, served as a transition release between Linuxcare and LNX-BBC, with both projects offering the same release on their respective sites. LNX-BBC produced three more BBC releases: 1.618 in August 2001, 2.0 in January 2003, and 2.1 on May 1, 2003. Early versions were assembled by hand, while later versions utilized GAR, a software build system built around GNU Automake. LNX-BBC was discontinued after the 2.1 release.

== 2011 company relaunch ==
The Linuxcare brand was repurchased by Arthur Tyde and incorporated as an LLC by Dr. Scott S. Elliott and his partners in the state of California. The new company provides IT services to businesses related to cloud computing. Linuxcare LLC has offices in San Francisco and Manila.
