= Open Source Development Labs =

Non-profit organization

- Successor: Linux Foundation
- Founded: 2000
- Dissolved: 2007
- Type: 501(c)(6) organization
- Purpose: Linux kernel, open source movement
- Location: San Francisco
- Region served: Worldwide
- Method: Promotion, protection, and standardization of Linux by providing unified resources and services needed for open source to successfully compete with closed platforms.

Open Source Development Labs (OSDL) was a non-profit organization supported by a consortium to promote Linux for enterprise computing. Founded in 2000, OSDL positioned itself as an independent, non-profit lab for developers who are adding enterprise capabilities to Linux. The headquarters was first incorporated in San Francisco but later relocated to Beaverton in Oregon with second facility in Yokohama, Japan.

On January 22, 2007, OSDL and the Free Standards Group merged to form the Linux Foundation, narrowing their respective focuses to that of promoting Linux.

== Activities ==
OSDL sponsored projects, including industry initiatives to enhance Linux for use in corporate data centres, in telecommunications networks, and on desktop computers. It also:

- provided hardware resources to the free software community and the open source community
- tested and reported on open source software
- employed a number of Linux developers.

Its employees included Linus Torvalds, the first OSDL fellow, and Bryce Harrington. In 2005, Andrew "Tridge" Tridgell was the second OSDL fellow for a year.

It had data centers in Beaverton (Oregon, United States) and Yokohama (Japan).

OSDL had investment backers that included: 7 funders of Computer Associates, Fujitsu, Hitachi, Hewlett-Packard, IBM, Intel Corporation, NEC, as well as a large collection of independent software vendors, end-user companies and educational institutions. A steering committee composed of representatives from the investment backers directed OSDL, which also had a significant staff of its own.

=== Working groups ===
OSDL had established five Working Groups since 2002:

- Mobile Linux Initiative
- Carrier Grade Linux
- Data Center Linux
- Desktop Linux
- User Advisory Council

== See also ==
- Patent Commons, a project launched in November 2005 by the OSDL
