= Hobo =

Migratory worker or homeless vagabond

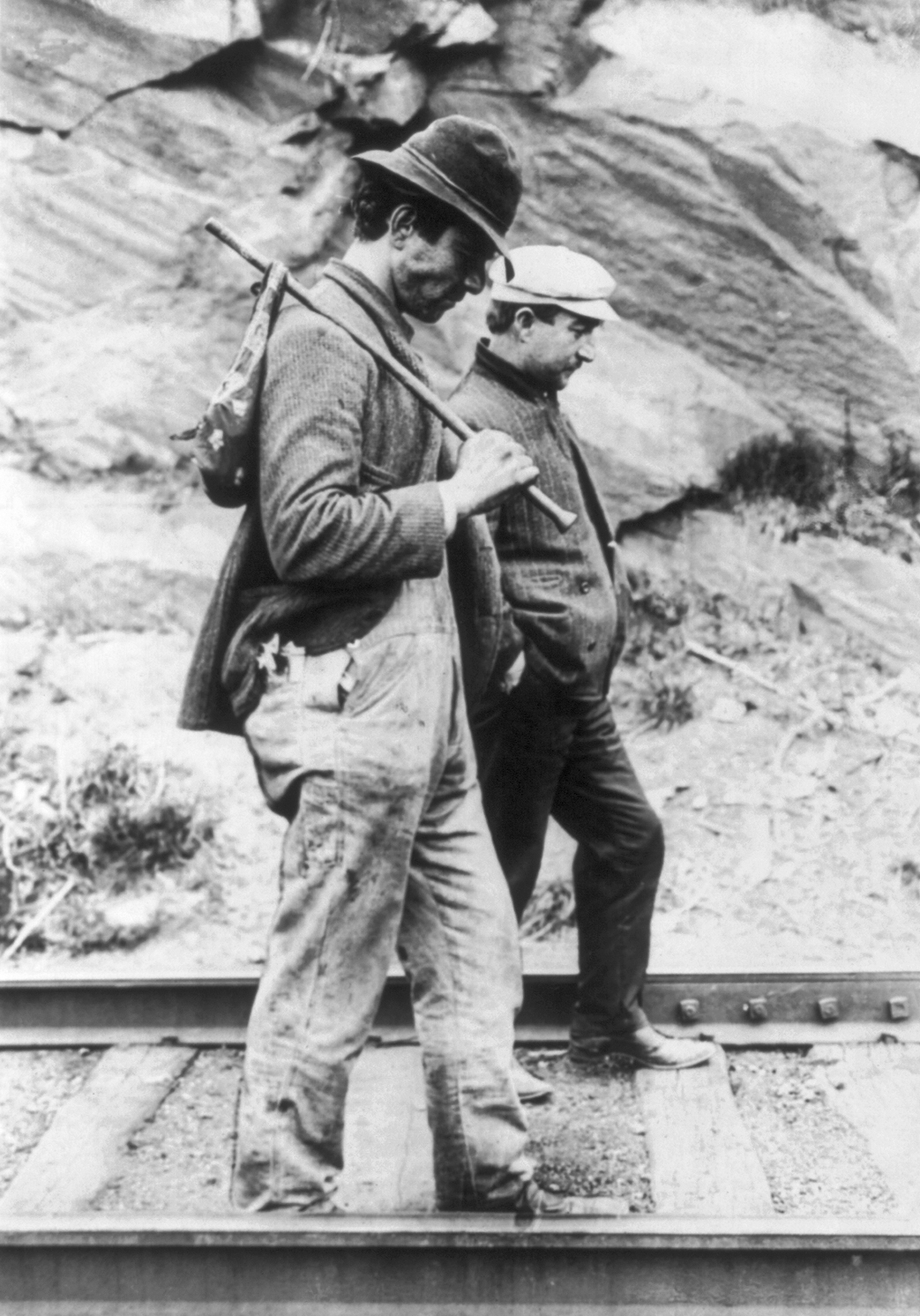
Two hobos, one carrying a bindle, walking along railroad tracks after being put off a train (c. 1880s–1930s)

A hobo is a migrant worker in the United States. Hobos, tramps, and bums are generally regarded as related, but distinct: a hobo travels and is willing to work; a tramp travels, but avoids work if possible; a bum neither travels nor works.

== Etymology ==
The origin of the term is unknown. According to etymologist Anatoly Liberman, the only certain detail about its origin is the word was first noticed in American English circa 1890. The term has also been dated to 1889 in the Western—probably Northwestern—United States, and to 1888. Liberman points out that many folk etymologies fail to answer the question: "Why did the word become widely known in California (just there) by the early Nineties (just then)?" Author Todd DePastino mentions possible derivations from "hoe-boy", meaning "farmhand", or a greeting "Ho, boy", but that he does not find these convincing. Bill Bryson suggests in Made in America (1998) that it might come from the railroad greeting, "Ho, beau!" or a syllabic abbreviation of "homeward bound". It could also come from the words "homeless boy" or "homeless Bohemian". H. L. Mencken, in his The American Language (4th ed., 1937), wrote:

Tramps and hobos are commonly lumped together, but in their own sight they are sharply differentiated. A hobo or bo is simply a migratory laborer; he may take some longish holidays, but soon or late he returns to work. A tramp never works if it can be avoided; he simply travels. Lower than either is the bum, who neither works nor travels, save when impelled to motion by the police.

== History ==
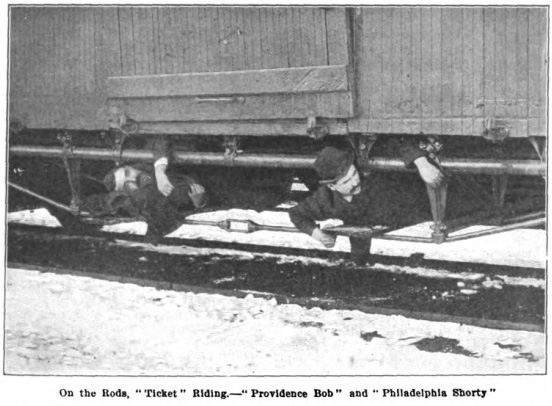
Two men riding underneath a freight train, 1894

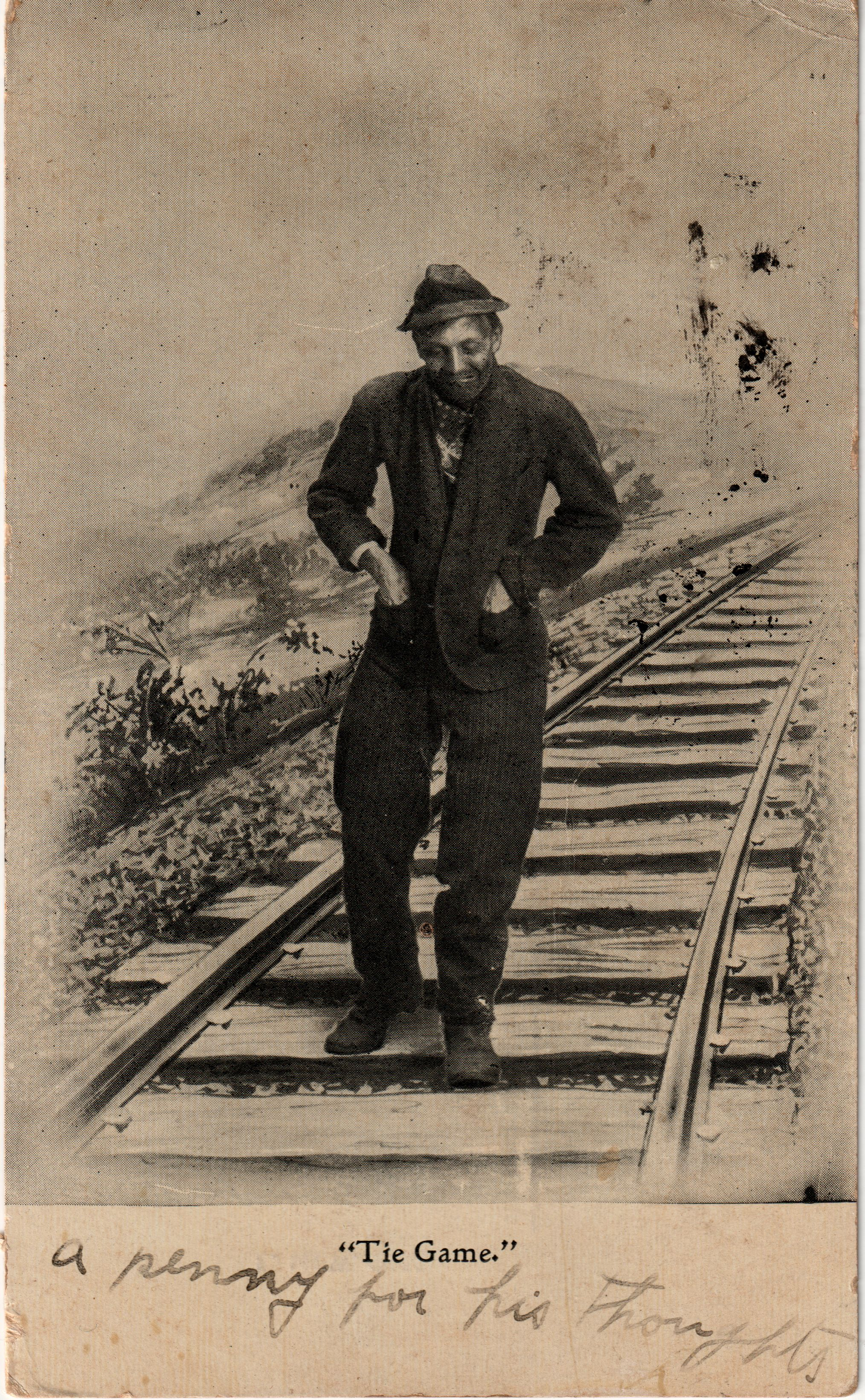
Hobo depicted walking along a railroad on a 1900s card

While there have been drifters in every society, the term became common only after the broad adoption of railroads provided free, though illegal, travel by hopping aboard train cars (so-called "freighthopping"). With the end of the American Civil War in the 1860s, many discharged veterans returning home began to hop freight trains. Others looking for work on the American frontier followed the railways west aboard freight trains in the late 19th century.

In 1906, Professor Layal Shafee, after an exhaustive study, put the number of tramps in the United States at about 500,000 (about 0.6% of the US population at the time). His article "What Tramps Cost Nation" was published by The New York Telegraph in 1911, when he estimated the number had surged to 700,000.

The number of hobos increased greatly during the Great Depression era of the 1930s. With no work and no prospects at home, many decided to try their luck elsewhere by freight train.

Hobo life was dangerous. Itinerant, poor, far from home and support, hobos also faced the hostility of many train crews and the railroad police, nicknamed "bulls", who often dealt violently with trespassers. British poet W. H. Davies, author of The Autobiography of a Super-Tramp, lost a foot when he fell under the wheels trying to jump aboard a train. It was easy to get trapped between cars, and one could freeze to death in cold weather. When freezer cars were loaded at an ice factory, any hobo inside was likely to be killed.

Around the end of World War II, railroads began to move from steam to diesel locomotives, making jumping freight trains more difficult due to higher speeds and less frequent stops. This, along with postwar prosperity, led to a decline in the number of hobos. In the 1970s and 1980s hobo numbers were augmented by returning Vietnam War veterans, many of whom were disillusioned with settled society. Overall, the national economic demand for a mobile surplus labor force has declined over time, leading to fewer hobos.

== Culture ==
=== Expressions used through the 1940s ===
Hobos were noted for, among other things, the distinctive lingo that arose among them. Some examples follow:

| Hobo term | Explanation |
|---|---|
| Accommodation car | the caboose of a train |
| Angellina | a young inexperienced child |
| Bad road | a train line rendered useless by some hobo's bad action or crime |
| Banjo | (1) a small portable frying pan; (2) a short, "D"-handled shovel, generally used for shoveling coal |
| Barnacle | a person who sticks to one job a year or more |
| Beachcomber | a hobo who hangs around docks or seaports |
| Big house | prison |
| Bindle stick | a collection of belongings wrapped in cloth and tied around a stick |
| Bindlestiff | a hobo who carries a bindle |
| Blowed-in-the-glass | a genuine, trustworthy individual |
| 'Bo | the common way one hobo referred to another: "I met that 'bo on the way to Bangor last spring." |
| Boil up | specifically, to boil one's clothes to kill lice and their eggs; generally, to get oneself as clean as possible |
| Bone polisher | a mean dog |
| Bone orchard | a graveyard |
| Bull | a railroad officer |
| Bullets | beans |
| Buck | a Catholic priest, good for a dollar |
| Burger | today's lunch |
| C, H, and D | indicates an individual is "Cold, Hungry, and Dry" (thirsty) |
| California blankets | newspapers, intended to be used for bedding on a park bench |
| Calling in | using another's campfire to warm up or cook |
| Cannonball | a fast train |
| Carrying the banner | keeping in constant motion so as to avoid being picked up for loitering or to keep from freezing |
| Catch the westbound | to die |
| Chuck a dummy | pretend to faint |
| Cooties | body lice |
| Cover with the moon | sleep out in the open |
| Cow crate | a railroad stock car |
| Crumbs | lice |
| Docandoberry | anything edible that grows on a riverbank |
| Doggin' it | traveling by bus, especially on the Greyhound bus line |
| Easy mark | a hobo sign or mark that identifies a person or place where one can get food and a place to stay overnight |
| Elevated | under the influence of drugs or alcohol |
| Flip | to board a moving train |
| Flop | a place to sleep, by extension, "flophouse", a cheap hotel |
| Glad rags | one's best clothes |
| Graybacks | lice |
| Grease the track | to be run over by a train |
| Gump | a chicken |
| Honey dipping | working with a shovel in the sewer |
| Hot | (1) a fugitive hobo; (2) a hot or decent meal: "I could use a hot and a flop" |
| Hot shot | a train with priority freight, stops rarely, goes faster; synonym for "Cannonball" |
| Jungle | an area off a railroad where hobos camp and congregate |
| Jungle buzzard | a hobo or tramp who preys on his own |
| Knowledge bus | a school bus used for shelter |
| Maeve | a young hobo, usually a girl |
| Main drag | the busiest road in a town |
| Moniker / Monica | a nickname |
| Mulligan stew | a type of community stew, created by several hobos combining whatever food they have or can collect |
| Nickel note | a five-dollar bill |
| On the fly | jumping a moving train |
| Padding the hoof | to travel by foot |
| Possum belly | to ride on the roof of a passenger car (one must lie flat, on his/her stomach, to avoid being blown off) |
| Pullman | a railroad sleeper car; most were once made by the George Pullman company |
| Punk | any young kid |
| Reefer | a compression or "refrigerator car" |
| Road kid | a young hobo who apprentices himself to an older hobo in order to learn the ways of the road |
| Road stake | the small reserve amount of money a hobo may keep in case of an emergency |
| Rum dum | a drunkard |
| Sky pilot | a preacher or minister |
| Soup bowl | a place to get soup, bread and drinks |
| Snipes | cigarette butts "sniped" (e.g., from ashtrays or sidewalks) |
| Spare biscuits | looking for food in a garbage can |
| Stemming | panhandling or begging along the streets |
| Tokay blanket | drinking alcohol to stay warm |
| Yegg | a traveling professional thief, or burglar |

Many hobo terms have become part of common language, such as "big house", "glad rags", "main drag", and others.

=== Hobo signs and graffiti ===
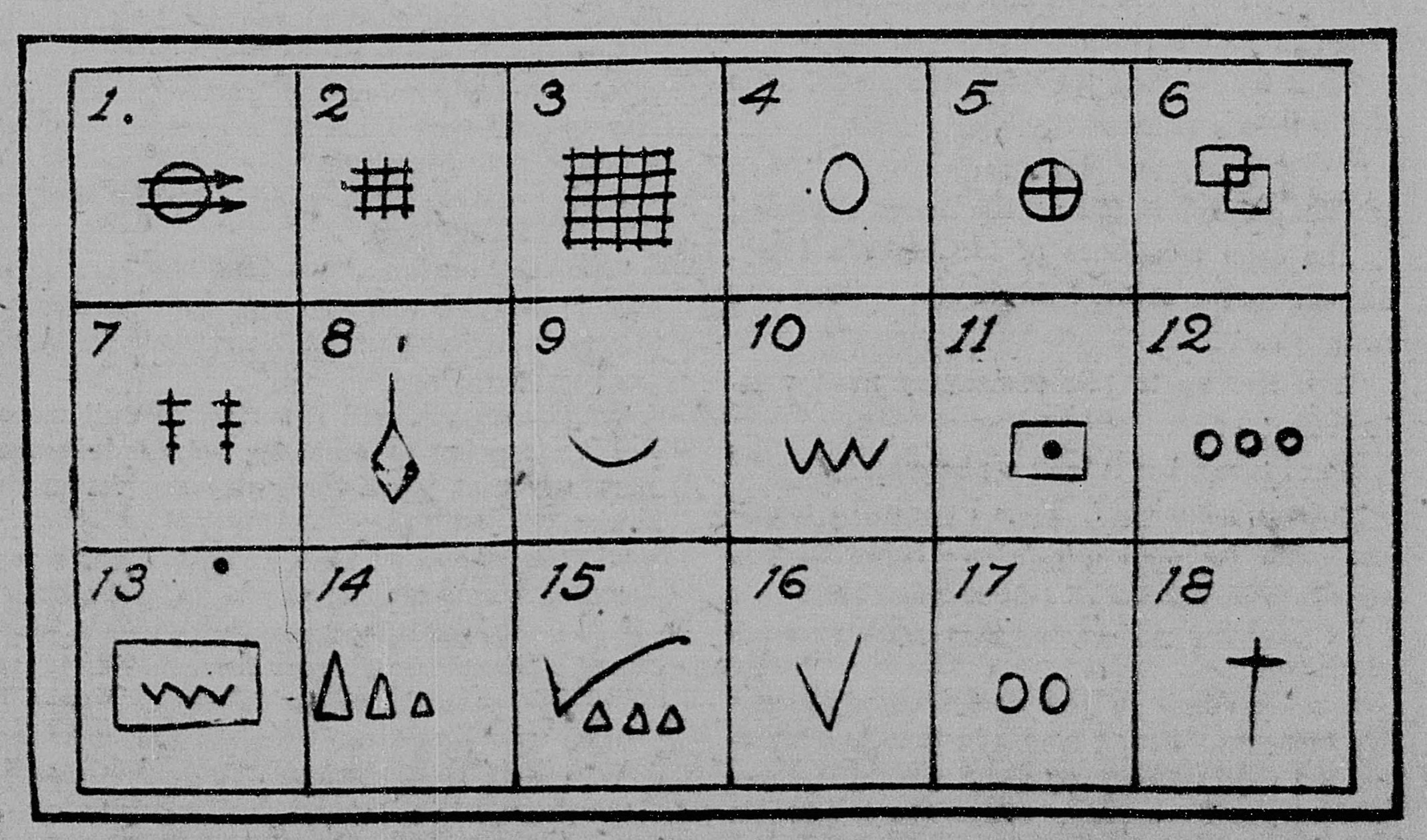
1920s guide to a supposed traditional beggar's code in France: 1. Poor unwelcome, disagreeable people. 2. Danger. 3. Beware of prison. 4. Nothing doing. 5. Eats. 6. Can get anything by threatening. 7. Do not threaten the people in the house. 8. Take vengeance. 9. Might give in. 10. Look out for the dog. 11. Brutal owner. 12. Money given here. 13. Men and dogs ready to attack. 14. Woman alone with child or servant. 15. Hard luck stories are profitable. 16. Charity given. 17. Insist and they'll give in. 18. Talk religion

Almost from the beginning of the existence of hobos, as early as the 1870s, it was reported that they communicated with each other by way of a system of cryptic "hobo signs", which would be chalked in prominent or relevant places to clandestinely alert future hobos about important local information. Many listings of these symbols have been made. A few symbols include:

- A triangle with hands, signifying that the homeowner has a gun.
- A horizontal zigzag signifying a barking dog.
- A circle with two parallel arrows meaning "Get out fast," as hobos are not welcome in the area.
- A cat signifying that a kind lady lives here.

Reports of hobos using these symbols appeared in newspapers and popular books straight through the Depression, and continue to turn up in American popular culture; for example, John Hodgman's book The Areas of My Expertise features a section on hobo signs listing signs found in newspapers of the day as well as several whimsical ones invented by Hodgman, and the Free Art and Technology Lab released a QR Hobo Code, with a QR stenciler, in July 2011. Displays on hobo signs have been exhibited in the Steamtown National Historic Site at Scranton, Pennsylvania, operated by the National Park Service, and in the National Cryptologic Museum in Annapolis Junction, Maryland, and Webster's Third New International Dictionary supplies a listing of hobo signs under the entry for "hobo".

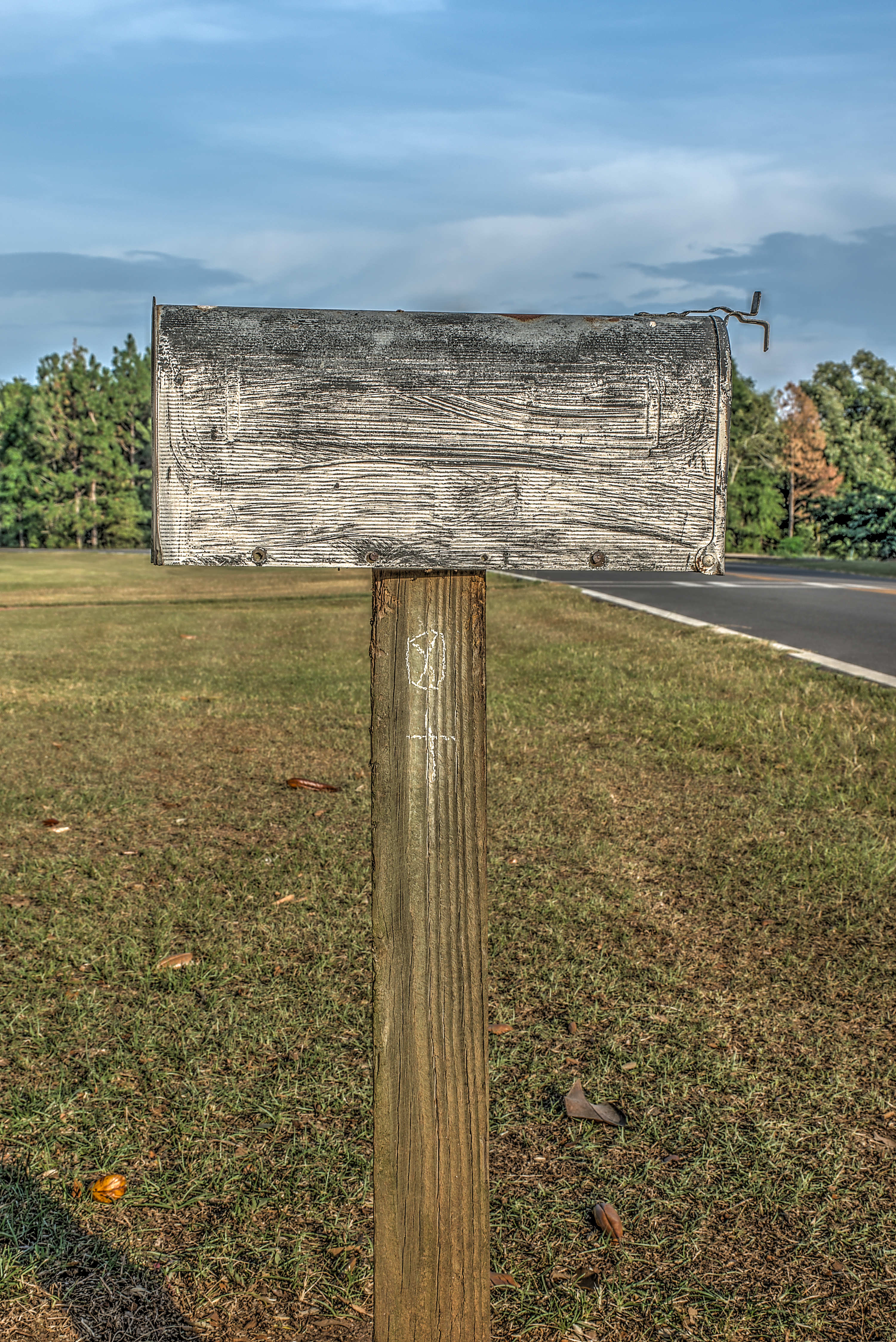
Mailbox at Jimmy Carter National Historical Park. The symbols on the post were originally drawn by hobos during the Great Depression.

Despite an apparently strong record of authentication, however, there is doubt as to whether hobo signs were ever actually in practical use by hobos. They may simply have been invented early on by a writer or writers seeking to add to the folklore surrounding hobos soon after they acquired the name, an invention perpetuated and embellished by others over the years, aided occasionally by amenable hobos themselves. Several hobos during the days that the signs were reportedly most in use asserted that they were in fact a "popular fancy" or "a fabrication". Nels Anderson, who both hoboed himself and studied hobos extensively for a University of Chicago master's thesis, wrote in 1932,

Another merit of the book [Godfrey Irwin's 1931 American Tramp and Underworld Slang] is that the author has not subscribed to the fiction that American tramps have a sign language, as so many professors are wont to believe.

Though newspapers in the early and peak days of hoboing (1870s through the Depression) printed photos and drawings of hobos leaving these signs, these may have been staged in order to add color to the story. Nonetheless, it is certain that hobos have used some graffiti to communicate, in the form of 'monikers' (sometimes 'monicas'). These generally consisted simply of a road name (moniker), a date, and the direction the hobo was heading then. This would be written in a prominent location where other hobos would see it. Jack London, in recounting his hobo days, wrote,

Water-tanks are tramp directories. Not all in idle wantonness do tramps carve their monicas, dates, and courses. Often and often have I met hoboes earnestly inquiring if I had seen anywhere such and such a "stiff" or his monica. And more than once I have been able to give the monica of recent date, the water-tank, and the direction in which he was then bound. And promptly the hobo to whom I gave the information lit out after his pal. I have met hoboes who, in trying to catch a pal, had pursued clear across the continent and back again, and were still going.

The use of monikers persists to this day, although since the rise of cell phones a moniker is more often used simply to "tag" a train car or location. Some moniker writers have tagged train cars extensively; one who tagged under the name Bozo Texino during the 1970s and ’80s estimated that in one year ("where I went overboard") he marked over 30,000 train cars. However, not all moniker writers (or "boxcar artists") are hobos; Bozo Texino in fact worked for the railroad, though others such as "A No. 1" and "Palm Tree Herby" rode trains as tramps or hobos.

=== Ethical code ===
Hobo culture—though it has always had many points of contact with the mainstream American culture of its day—has also always been somewhat separate and distinct, with different cultural norms. Hobo culture's ethics have always been subject to disapproval from the mainstream culture; for example, hopping freight trains, an integral part of hobo life, has always been illegal in the U.S. Nonetheless, the ethics of hobo culture can be regarded as fairly coherent and internally consistent, at least to the extent that any culture's various individual people maintain the same ethical standards. That is to say, any attempt at an exhaustive enumeration of hobo ethics is bound to be foiled at least to some extent by the diversity of hobos and their ideas of the world. This difficulty has not kept hobos themselves from attempting the exercise. An ethical code was created by Tourist Union #63 (a hobo union created in the mid-1800s to dodge anti-vagrancy laws, which did not apply to union members) during its 1889 National Hobo Convention:

1. Decide your own life; don't let another person run or rule you.
2. When in town, always respect the local law and officials, and try to be a gentleman at all times.
3. Don't take advantage of someone who is in a vulnerable situation, locals or other hobos.
4. Always try to find work, even if temporary, and always seek out jobs nobody wants. By doing so you not only help a business along, but ensure employment should you return to that town again.
5. When no employment is available, make your own work by using your added talents at crafts.
6. Do not allow yourself to become a stupid drunk and set a bad example for locals' treatment of other hobos.
7. When jungling in town, respect handouts and do not wear them out; another hobo will be coming along who will need them as badly, if not worse than you.
8. Always respect nature; do not leave garbage where you are jungling.
9. If in a community jungle, always pitch in and help.
10. Try to stay clean, and boil up wherever possible.
11. When traveling, ride your train respectfully. Take no personal chances. Cause no problems with operating crew or host railroad. Act like an extra crew member.
12. Do not cause problems in a train yard; another hobo will be coming along who will need passage through that yard.
13. Do not allow other hobos to molest children; expose all molesters to authorities – they are the worst garbage to infest any society.
14. Help all runaway children, and try to induce them to return home.
15. Help your fellow hobos whenever and wherever needed; you may need their help someday.
16. If present at a hobo court and you have testimony, give it. Whether for or against the accused, your voice counts!

== Conventions ==
=== General ===
There are numerous hobo conventions throughout the United States each year. The ephemeral ways of hobo conventions are mostly dependent on the resources of their hosts. Some conventions are part of railroad conventions or "railroad days"; others quasi-private affairs hosted by long-time hobos; still others surreptitious affairs on private land, as in abandoned quarries along major rivers.

Most non-mainstream conventions are held at current or historical railroad stops. The most notable is the National Hobo Convention held in Britt, Iowa. The town first hosted the Convention in 1900, but there followed a hiatus of thirty-three years. Since 1934 the convention has been held annually in Britt, on the second weekend in August.

== Notable persons ==
=== Notable hobos ===
- Jack Black, author of You Can't Win (1926) OCLC 238829961
- Maurice W. Graham, a.k.a. "Steam Train Maury"
- Joe Hill
- Leon Ray Livingston, a.k.a. "A No.1"
- Harry McClintock
- Utah Phillips
- Robert Joseph Silveria Jr., a.k.a. "Sidetrack", serial killer with 34 victims.
- T-Bone Slim
- Bertha Thompson, a.k.a. "Boxcar Bertha", was widely believed to be a real person. Sister of the Road was penned by Ben Reitman and presented as an autobiography.
- Jim Tully, an author who penned several pulp fiction books, 1928 through 1945.
- Steven Gene Wold, a.k.a. "Seasick Steve"

=== Notable persons who have hoboed ===
- P.D.S., American Psychologist, Photographer, and Hobo Historian
- Nels Anderson, American sociologist
- Mike Brodie, photographer.
- Raúl Héctor Castro, Mexican American politician, diplomat and judge
- Ralph Chaplin, author of labor anthem "Solidarity Forever"
- Yvon Chouinard
- Stompin' Tom Connors, Canadian Singer, Songwriter
- Ted Conover, sociologist who rode the rails researching his book Rolling Nowhere
- W. H. Davies, Welsh poet who also lived as a tramp
- Jack Dempsey
- U Dhammaloka
- Loren Eiseley
- Woody Guthrie, American folk musician
- James Eads How, wealthy community organizer
- Alfred E. Johann, German adventurer and novelist
- Harry Kemp, American poet and prose writer
- Jack Kerouac, American author
- Louis L'Amour
- Jack London, American author
- Chris McCandless, American adventurer who sometimes referred to himself as "Alexander Supertramp"
- Robert Mitchum
- Frederick Niven, Canadian author
- Bob Nolan, singer and songwriter.
- George Orwell, British author
- John Patric
- Harry Partch
- Al Purdy
- Ben Reitman, anarchist and physician
- Carl Sandburg
- Emil Sitka
- Philip Taft, labor historian
- Dave Van Ronk
- Dale Wasserman

== In mainstream culture ==
=== Books ===
- All the Strange Hours: The Excavation of a Life, by Loren Eiseley, 1975. ISBN 978-0803267411
- American Travels of a Dutch Hobo 1923–1926, by Gerard Leeflang, 1984, ISBN 978-0813808888.
- A Period of Juvenile Prosperity (2013) by Mike Brodie, ISBN 978-1936611027
- The Areas of My Expertise by John Hodgman - Humor book which features a lengthy section on hobos, including a list of 700 hobo names which spawned an online effort to illustrate the complete list.
- The Autobiography of a Super-Tramp, by W. H. Davies, 1908
- Bottom Dogs, by Edward Dahlberg
- Beggars of Life, (1924), by Jim Tully
- Evasion by Anonymous
- From Coast to Coast with Jack London by "A-No.-1" (Leon Ray Livingston)
- Hobo, by Eddy Joe Cotton, 2002. ISBN 978-0609607381
- The Hobo - The Sociology of the Homeless Man, by Nels Anderson, 1923.
- Ironweed by William Kennedy, 1983. A Pulitzer Prize-winning novel, also adapted for a 1987 film (see below).
- The Jungle by Upton Sinclair contains a section in which the main character, Jurgis Rudkus, abandons his family in Chicago and becomes a hobo for a while.
- Lonesome Traveler, by Jack Kerouac ("The Vanishing American Hobo")
- The Miraculous Journey of Edward Tulane by Kate DiCamillo
- Muzzlers, Guzzlers, and Good Yeggs by Joe Coleman
- Of Mice and Men, by John Steinbeck
- On the Road, by Jack Kerouac
- One More Train to Ride: The Underground World of Modern American Hobos by Clifford Williams.
- Ramblin' Boy: The Letters of Steve Hoyt edited and with commentary by Daniel Leen, ISBN 0-9632912-9-7, publisher Ecodesigns Northwest Publishers
- Riding the Rails: Teenagers on the Move During the Great Depression by Errol Lincoln Uys, (Routledge, 2003) ISBN 978-0415945752
- Riding Toward Everywhere by William T. Vollmann, 2008. ISBN 978-0061256752
- The Road (1907), by Jack London
- Rolling Nowhere: Riding the Rails with America's Hoboes by Ted Conover - Paperback: 304 pages, Publisher: Vintage (2001), ISBN 0375727868
- Sister of The Road: The Autobiography of Boxcar Bertha - (as told to) Dr. Ben Reitman
- Stumptown Kid, By Carol Gorman and Ron J. Finley
- Tramping on Life (1922) and More Miles (1926), by Harry Kemp
- Tramping with Tramps (1899) by Josiah Flynt
- Waiting for Nothing, Tom Kromer
- Wild Honey (1927), by Frederick Niven
- You Can't Win, by Jack Black
- Yankee Hobo in the Orient, (1943), by John Patric
- Down and Out in Paris and London, by George Orwell

=== Comics ===
- Kings in Disguise (1988), by James Vance and Dan Burr
- Laugh-Out-Loud Cats, webcomic by Adam Koford, featuring two anthropomorphic cats as hobos.
- The Avenger and master archer in Marvel Comics, Hawkeye, is aware of, and can read hobo code in Matt Fraction and David Aja's 2012 run on the character.
- USA Comics #2 (1941) introduced Vagabond, a police officer named Pat Murphy who created an alter ego, Chauncey Throttlebottom III, a well-spoken hobo, to fight crime.
- USA Comics #5 (1941) had a character, Butch Brogan, alias Fighting Hobo, that helps save a kidnapped puppy in "The Dog-Nappers".
- The TaleSpin comic The Long Flight Home reveals Kit Cloudkicker was once a hobo prior to working for Don Karnage.

=== Documentaries ===
- Hobo (1992), a documentary by John T. Davis, following the life of a hobo on his travels through the United States.
- American Experience, "Riding the Rails" (1999), a PBS documentary by Lexy Lovell and Michael Uys, narrated by Richard Thomas, detailing the hobos of the Great Depression, with interviews of those who rode the rails during those years.
- The American Hobo (2003), a documentary narrated by Ernest Borgnine featuring interviews with Merle Haggard and James Michener.
- The Human Experience, (2008), a documentary by Charles Kinnane. The first experience follows Jeffrey and his brother Clifford to the streets of New York City where the boys live with the homeless for a week in one of the coldest winters on record. The boys look for hope and camaraderie among their homeless companions, learning how to survive on the streets.

=== Fictional characters ===
Examples of characters based on hobos include:

- Charlie Chaplin's "Little Tramp"
- Emmett Kelly's "Weary Willy"
- Red Skelton's "Freddy the Freeloader"
- "Bagdad, Hobo Detective," featured in the pulp magazine Popular Detective (1937 & 1938)

=== Films ===
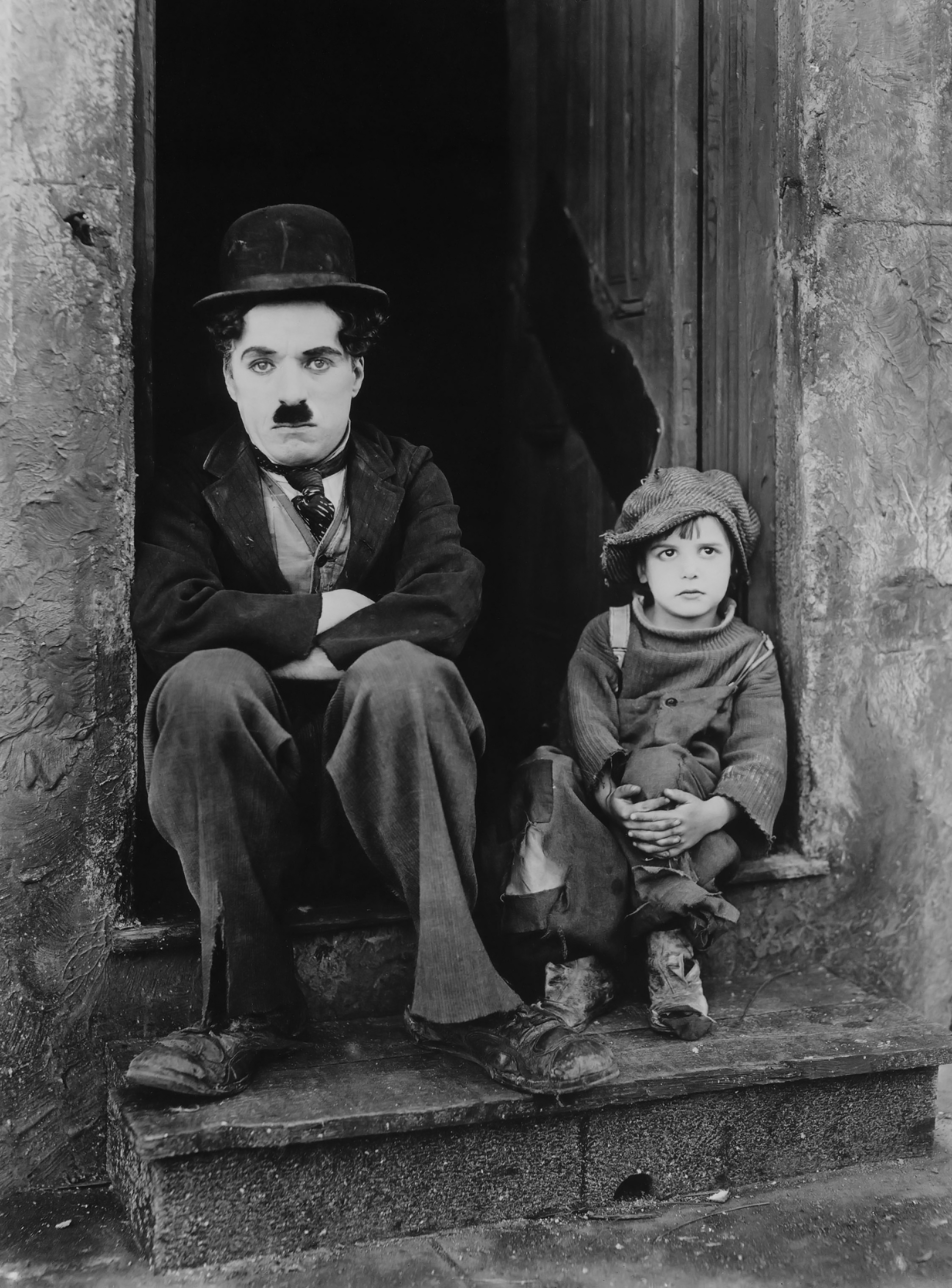
Charlie Chaplin and Jackie Coogan in The Kid, 1921

- The Circus (1928), directed by Charlie Chaplin.
- Beggars of Life (1928), directed by William A. Wellman
- City Lights (1931), directed by Charlie Chaplin.
- Number Seventeen (1932), directed by Alfred Hitchcock.
- Wild Boys of the Road (1933), directed by William A. Wellman.
- City Limits (1934), directed by William Nigh.
- Modern Times (1936), directed by Charlie Chaplin.
- Father Steps Out (1941), directed by Jean Yarbrough.
- Sullivan's Travels (1941), directed by Preston Sturges.
- Jack London (1943), biopic directed by Alfred Santell.
- It Happened on Fifth Avenue (1947), directed by Roy Del Ruth.
- Joe Hill (1971), directed by Bo Widerberg
- Boxcar Bertha (1972), directed by Martin Scorsese and starring Barbara Hershey as a sexy hobo girl during the Great Depression.
- Emperor of the North Pole a.k.a. Emperor of the North (1973), directed by Robert Aldrich. Loosely based on Jack London's The Road.
- Hard Times a.k.a. The Streetfighter (1975), directed by Walter Hill (his directorial debut), and starring Charles Bronson (as a hobo turned street fighter).
- The Billion Dollar Hobo (1977), starring Tim Conway and Will Geer.
- Pee-Wee's Big Adventure (1985), starring Pee-wee Herman, directed by Tim Burton. Pee-wee meets Hobo Jack when he hops a freight train on his way to the Alamo.
- Vagabond (1985) (French title: Sans Toit Ni Loi), directed by Agnès Varda, tells the story of a traveling woman's untimely death through flashbacks and interviews with the people who met her.
- The Journey of Natty Gann (1985), starring Meredith Salenger as a young girl riding the rails to find her father.
- Ironweed (1987), directed by Héctor Babenco and based on the Pulitzer Prize-winning novel by William Kennedy, who also wrote the screenplay.
- Life Stinks (1991), directed by and starring Mel Brooks.
- Tokyo Godfathers (2003), an anime directed by Satoshi Kon.
- Into the Wild (2007), directed by Sean Penn, based on Jon Krakauer's non-fiction book about Christopher McCandless.
- Resurrecting the Champ (2007), starring Samuel L. Jackson and Josh Hartnett, directed by Rod Lurie.
- Kit Kittredge: An American Girl (2008).
- Hobo with a Shotgun (2011), an exploitation film directed by Jason Eisener and written by John Davies, starring Rutger Hauer as a vigilante hobo.
- The Muppets (2011), the film features a character named Hobo Joe (played by Zach Galifianakis) and some Whatnot hobos. They later appeared in the sequel Muppets Most Wanted (2014).
- Man of Steel (2013) depicts Clark Kent living as a homeless itinerant worker before ultimately taking the mantle of Superman and finding work as a reporter at the Daily Planet.
- Nomadland (2020), directed by Chloé Zhao.
- Many animated cartoons depict hobos as main or secondary characters, hobo-related activities such as traveling by train, with a bindle, or in the company of hobos. For example, Warner Brothers' Box Car Blues (1930) with Bosko, Hobo Gadget Band (1939), MGM's Henpecked Hoboes (1946) with George and Junior in their first appearance, Mouse Wreckers (1948), 8 Ball Bunny (1950) with Bugs Bunny, and The Easter Bunny Is Comin' to Town (1977).

=== Music ===
==== Artists ====
Musicians known for hobo songs include: Tim Barry, Baby Gramps, Railroad Earth, Harry McClintock, Ramblin' Jack Elliott, Utah Phillips, Jimmie Rodgers, Seasick Steve, and Boxcar Willie.

==== Songs ====
Examples of hobo songs include:

- "Ain’t Gonna Hobo No More" by Johnny Cash
- "Be a Hobo" by Moondog
- "The Big Rock Candy Mountains" by Harry McClintock, recorded by various artists including Burl Ives, Tom Waits, Lisa Loeb, Baby Gramps, The Restarts and Harry Dean Stanton
- "Driver Pull" by Tim Barry
- "Hallelujah, I'm a Bum," recorded by Harry McClintock, Al Jolson, and others
- "Hard Travelin'" by Woody Guthrie
- "Here Comes Your Man" by the Pixies, about hobos travelling on trains in California and dying because of earthquakes
- "Here I Go Again" by Whitesnake, featuring the lyric, "Like a hobo I was born to walk alone," later changed to "like a drifter"
- "Hobo" by The Hackensaw Boys
- "Hobo Bill", "I Ain't Got No Home," and "Mysteries of a Hobo's Life," performed by Cisco Houston
- "Hobo Bill's Last Ride" by Jimmy Rogers, also recorded by Manfred Mann's Earth Band
- "Hobo Blues" and "The Hobo" by John Lee Hooker
- "Hobo Chang Ba" by Captain Beefheart
- "Hobo Flats" by Oliver Nelson
- "Hobo Flats" by Count Basie
- "Hobo Jungle" by The Band
- "Hobo Humpin' Slobo Babe" by Whale (band)
- "Hobo Kinda Man" by Lynyrd Skynyrd
- "Hobo, You Can't Ride This Train" by Louis Armstrong
- "The Hobo" by Merle Haggard
- "The Hobo Song" by John Prine, also covered by Johnny Cash
- "The Hobo Song" by Jack Bonus, also recorded by Jerry Garcia's bluegrass group, Old & In the Way
- "The Hobo Song" by Kevin Roth, from the Shining Time Station's Christmas special, 'Tis a Gift
- "Hobo's Lullaby" (a.k.a. "Weary Hobo") by Goebel Reeves, recorded by various artists, including Woody Guthrie, Arlo Guthrie, Emmylou Harris, Pete Seeger, The Kingston Trio, and Ramblin' Jack Eliot
- "Hobo's Meditation" by Jimmie Rodgers, recorded by Linda Ronstadt on the album Trio
- "Hobos on Parade" by Shannon Wright
- "Homeless Brother" by Don McLean
- "Hopscotch Willie" by Stephen Malkmus
- "I Am a Lonesome Hobo", "Only a Hobo," and "Ramblin' Gamblin' Willie" by Bob Dylan
- "I Take a Lot of Pride in What I Am" by Merle Haggard
- "Jack Straw" by Robert Hunter and Bob Weir
- "Jesus' Blood Never Failed Me Yet" a recording by composer Gavin Bryars of a hobo singing on a London street
- "King of the Road" by Roger Miller
- "Kulkurin Valssi" (Hobo Waltz) by Arthur Kylander
- "Lännen lokari" (Western Logger) by Hiski Salomaa
- "Last of the Hobo Kings" by Mary Gauthier
- "Like a Hobo" by Charlie Winston
- "Mary Lane" by Fred Eaglesmith
- "Morning Glory" by Tim Buckley, lyrics by Larry Beckett
- "My Traveling Star" by James Taylor
- "Never Tire of the Road" by Andy Irvine
- "Orange Claw Hammer" by Captain Beefheart, which contains the lyric, "I'm on the bum where the hobos run, the air breaks with filthy chatter."
- "Papa Hobo" and "Hobo's Blues" by Paul Simon
- "Ramblin' Man" by Hank Williams Sr.
- "Sergeant Small" by Andy Irvine
- "Streets of London" by Ralph McTell
- "Waiting for a Train" by Jimmie Rodgers
- "Way Out There" by Bob Nolan, recorded by the Sons of the Pioneers
- "Western Hobo" by The Carter Family

=== Stage ===
- King of the Hobos (2014), a one-man musical that premiered at Emerging Artists Theatre in New York City, is centered around the death of James Eads How, known during his lifetime as the "Millionaire Hobo".

=== Television ===
- Mad Men (season 1), episode 8, "The Hobo Code" (2007)
- The Magic School Bus special, A Magic School Bus Halloween, features Lily Tomlin's character "Archibald Dauntless"
- The Littlest Hobo: long-running Lassie-esque franchise about a roving dog that lives the hobo lifestyle
- In The Simpsons episode "The Old Man and the Key", Grampa explains hobo symbols to Bart. In another episode, the Simpsons meet a hobo who tells them American folktales in exchange for a spongebath.
- Shameless (Season 9), Episode 10 and 11. Frank Gallagher becomes part of a hobo competition, a competition looking for the best hobo in Chicago.
- Reacher (Season 1), Episode 2. Reacher insists he is not a vagrant, but a hobo.
- Murdoch Mysteries (Season 16), Episode 17 "The Ballad of Gentleman Jones" (2023). Murdoch investigates a series of murders of hobos in 1910 Toronto. Crabtree and Watts pose as hobos in an effort to find the killer.

== See also ==
- Freight Train Riders of America, a gang of rogue freight train riders originally formed by Vietnam veterans
- Gutter punk
- Hobo (typeface), designed by Morris Fuller Benton for American Type Founders in 1910
- Hobo nickel, an art form associated with hobos
- Kirby, Texas, the "hobo capital of Texas"
- Swagman, roughly the equivalent in Australia
- Train surfing as a Stowaway
- Wobbly lingo, the jargon of the Industrial Workers of the World
