= National Hobo Convention =

Annual convention in Britt, Iowa

Coordinates: 43°5′47″N 93°48′4″W

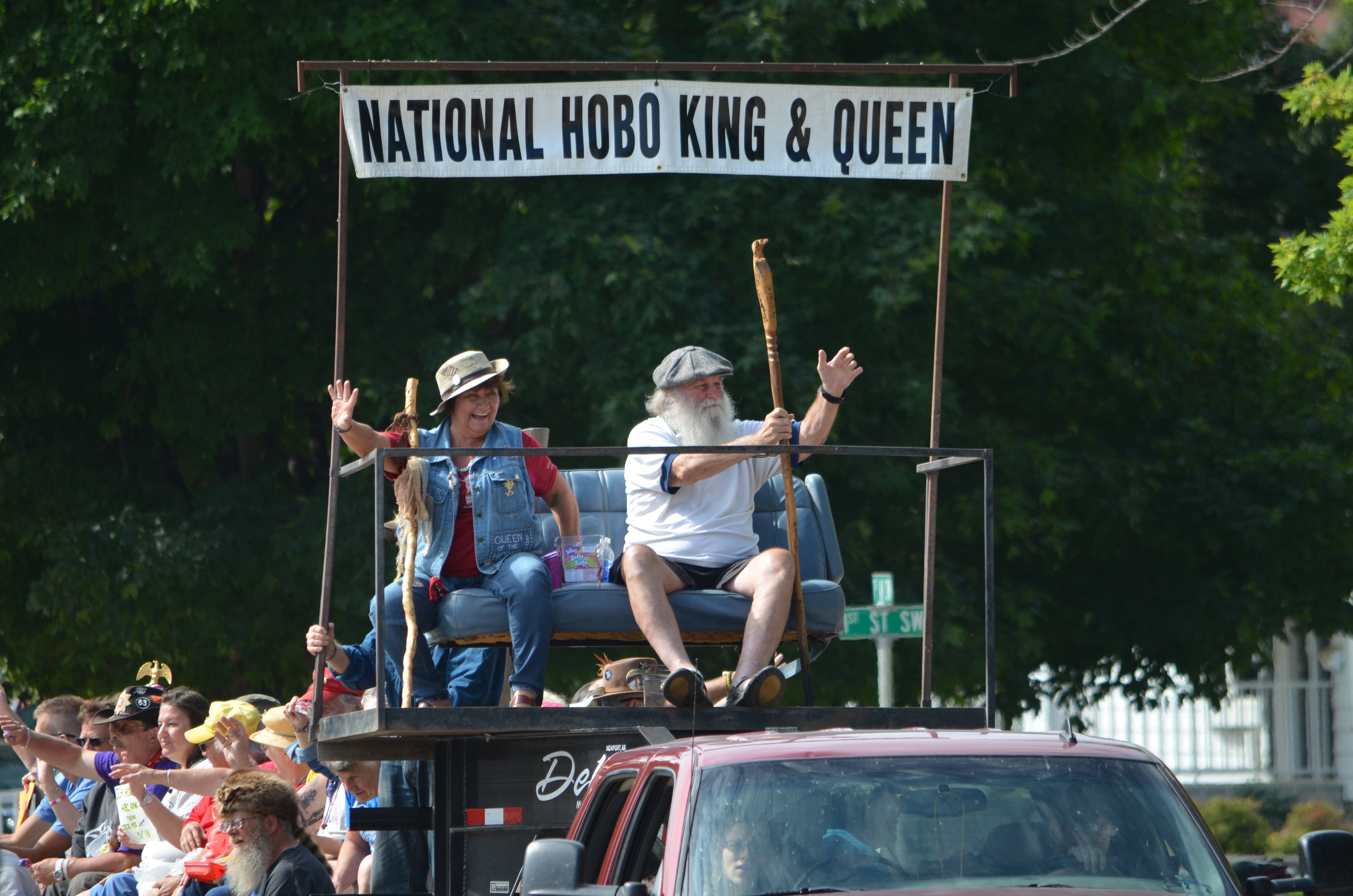
Hobo King and Queen at the 2015 Convention

The National Hobo Convention is held on the second weekend of every August since 1900 in the town of Britt, Iowa, organized by the local Chamber of Commerce, and known throughout the town as the annual "Hobo Day" or "Hobo Days" celebration. The National Hobo Convention is the United States' largest gathering of hobos, itinerants, rail-riders (including train-hoppers), and tramps, who gather at the event to celebrate the American traveling worker.

== Events ==
Events include a Hobo 5K & Hobo 10K Walk/Run, Hobo King & Hobo Queen coronation, Hobo Museum, Hobo Auction, Hobo Memorial Service, Hobo Sunday Outdoor Church Service, Hobo Classic Car Show, Hobo Arts and Crafts Show and various hobo musical entertainment. The Hobo Jungle is open to the public.
