= Maurice W. Graham =

King of the Hoboes (1917–2006)

Maurice W. Graham (June 3, 1917 – November 18, 2006), also known as Steam Train Maury, was the five-time holder of the title "King of the Hobos", and was later known as "Patriarch of the Hobos". Born to a broken home in Ohio, he was shunted from father to mother to aunt to married siblings. In 1931, at the age of 14, Graham began riding the rails as a hobo during the Great Depression. He settled in Toledo, Ohio, with his wife Wanda in the late 1930s, where he worked as a cement mason and founded a trade school for masons. During World War II, he served in the military as a medical technician. For a brief period he lived in Wapakoneta, OH where he met Arlene Parish. The couple had twins, Maureen Candice Graham, and Maurice Andrew Graham on April 22nd 1963. He never married Arlene and eventually abandoned her and his children in 1968. In 1969 he returned to the hobo life for another eleven years, finally retiring in 1980.

Maury Graham adopted the nickname "Steam Train" in 1969, when the "Golden Spike Special" steam train came through Ohio, returning home from the 100th anniversary of the completion of the first US transcontinental railroad. He was one of the founding members of the National Hobo Foundation. He also helped established the Hobo Museum in Britt, Iowa.

Mr. Maurice Graham died due to complications from a stroke at the Northcrest Nursing Home in Napoleon, Ohio. He was 89.

In 2007, the acclaimed singer/songwriter Mary Gauthier paid tribute to Steam Train Maury in her song "Last of the Hobo Kings", which was a track on her album "Between Daylight and Dark".

== Sources ==
- Tales of the Iron Road: My Life as King of the Hobos. Marlowe & Co., 1989. Reprinted in 1992. ISBN 1-56924-916-4.
