= Cul Richards =

American athletics coach (1898 – 1970)

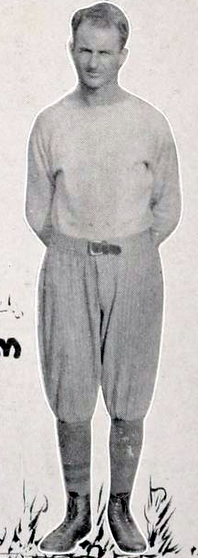
- Richards in 1927

Biographical details
- Born: May 5, 1898; Britt, Iowa, U.S.
- Died: December 31, 1970 (aged 72); Adamsville, Texas, U.S.
- Education: Grinnell College (A.B. 1922)

Coaching career (HC unless noted)

Baseball
- 1926: Clemson

Football
- 1924–25: Clemson (freshmen)

Head coaching record
- Overall: 8–11

Leon Kenneth "Cul" Richards (May 5, 1898 – December 31, 1970) was an American athletics coach and businessman. Born in Britt, Iowa in 1898, he graduated from Grinnell College in 1922. At Grinnell, he played on the football team under coach Bud Saunders. In 1924 he became coach of the freshman football team at Clemson College (now University), under head varsity coach Saunders. Richards was also head baseball coach in 1926, leading the team to an 8–11 record. He and Frank Padgett were interim head coaches for one game in the 1926 football season after Saunders resigned and before Bob Williams took over.

Richards left Clemson after receiving a degree in civil engineering in 1927. He moved to Waco, Texas, and started a construction supply business. His son was the husband of Texas Governor Ann Richards.
