= Leon Ray Livingston =

American hobo and writer (1872–1944)

- Livingston in an adult portrait
- Born: July 16, 1872; San Francisco, California, U.S.
- Died: December 8, 1944 (aged 72); Erie, Pennsylvania, U.S.
- Other name: The Rambler
- Occupation: Author
- Children: 2
- Writing career
- Pen name: A-№1

Leon Ray Livingston (1872–1944) was a famous hobo and author, travelling under the moniker "A-№1" and often referred to as "The Rambler." He perfected the hobo symbols system, which let other hobos know where there are generous people, free food, jobs, vicious dogs, and so forth. He was not a poor man; he simply preferred a life of travelling the country by train to sitting at home. In his memoir The Ways of the Hobo, Livingston admitted that he was uneducated, but began his self-education at the age of 35.

He has been lauded by many American historians as the King of the Hoboes and has followings all over the U.S.

Livingston wrote twelve books on traveling the hobo way. His books brought attention not only to the state of the homeless in America, but also to the excitement and benefits of traveling the country for amusement. He lived and published his books in Erie, Pennsylvania, and Cambridge Springs, Pennsylvania. He described Cambridge Springs in The Ways of the Hobo as an "idyllic," "delightful" and "charming" summer resort town known for "the medicinal properties of its numberless gushing springs" which he chose as his headquarters to find "a brief respite from the hardships of the Road" after the hobo lifestyle brought him "dangerously close to the verge of a mental and physical collapse." As a result, Cambridge Springs became a "veritable 'Mecca' to chronic hobos."

There were many hobos who imitated Livingston and claimed the moniker A-No. 1. Due to this, Livingston was known to travel with a scrapbook of his journeys (which included a personalized note from President William Howard Taft and an autograph from Theodore Roosevelt), copies of his books, and always two $50 bills. In a rarity among hobos of his time, Livingston did not smoke or drink, and was known to always dress well and be exceptionally clean.

The year after the death of author Jack London, Livingston published a memoir in which he described their cross-country adventures together during the late 19th century. According to Livingston, the "keen and penetrating" 18-year-old London had tracked him down and was "faithfully acting the role of the dog who adopted his master." The book, titled From Coast to Coast with Jack London, became the basis for the movie Emperor of the North Pole (1973), directed by Robert Aldrich.

During his later life, he continued to roam the country, but he became a lecturer warning families and children against tramp life. "I began out of necessity, continued because I loved the life, and now because I know nothing else," he said.

He died in 1944 in Erie, Pennsylvania of heart failure. While having a grave marked "A-No.1 At rest at last" in a Cambridge Springs, Pennsylvania cemetery, his actual body was buried in Laurel Hill Cemetery outside of Erie.

== Published works ==
- Life and Adventures of A-No.-1: America's Most Celebrated Tramp (1910)
- Hobo Camp Fire Tales (1911)
- The Curse of Tramp Life (1912)
- The Trail of the Tramp (1913)
- The Adventures of a Female Tramp (1914)
- The Ways of the Hobo (1914)
- The Snare of the Road (1916)
- From Coast to Coast with Jack London (1917)
- Mother Delcassee of the hobos: And other stories (1918)
- The Wife I Won (1919)
- Traveling with Tramps (1920)
- Here and There with A-No.-1, America's Most Famous Tramp (1921)
