= Josiah Flynt =

American sociologist and author (1869–1907)

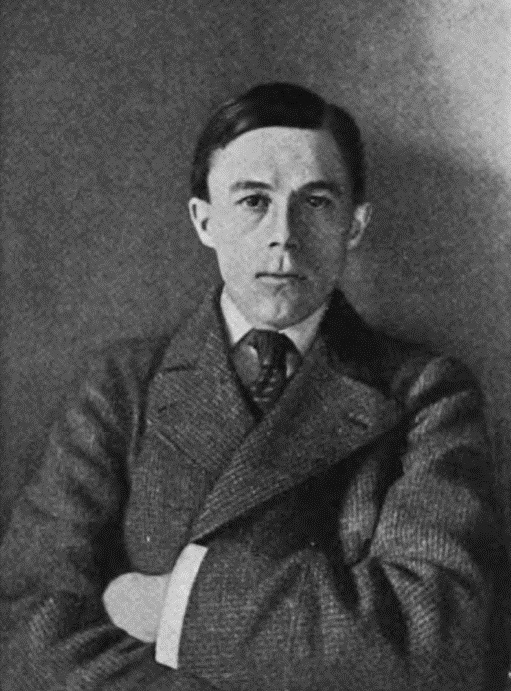
- Born: Josiah Flynt Willard; January 23, 1869; Appleton, Wisconsin
- Died: January 20, 1907 (aged 37); Chicago, Illinois
- Resting place: Rosehill Cemetery
- Education: University of Berlin
- Occupations: Author, sociologist
- Writing career
- Notable work: Tramping with Tramps

Signature
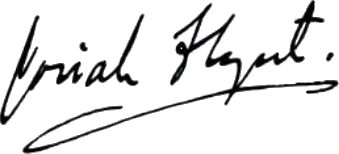

Josiah Flynt Willard (January 23, 1869 – January 20, 1907), who wrote under the name Josiah Flynt, was an American sociologist and author.

== Biography ==
Flynt was born in Appleton, Wisconsin, to Oliver and Mary Bannister Willard. His father was editor of the local paper. He would later say that his earliest memory was of fleeing his nurse after being beaten "for some small offense"; the flight brought him "a ... measure of unalloyed joy."

Willard's father died in March 1878. While being raised by his mother and grandmother, he frequently ran away. He was sent to live in small-town Nebraska and an Illinois boarding house. In 1884, when his mother and sisters left for Europe, he was sent to a college in Illinois where he found success in history and modern languages. When he placed third in an essay contest, he was inconsolable and left that college permanently.

He then was involved in theft, eventually being sent to a reform school for a year. He escaped, made his way to West Virginia, and began the eight-month tramp that would lead to his writing career and assumed expertise on tramps and tramping.

Afterward he left for Europe to stay with his mother. He was educated at the Friedrich-Wilhelms-Universität (in Berlin) from 1890 to 1895. While in Europe he visited England, Switzerland, Italy, and Russia. Among luminaries he met were Leo Tolstoy and Henrik Ibsen.

It was while in St. Petersburg that he first took place in a police raid. Shortly after returning to the United States in 1898, he received an invitation from railroad executive L. F. Loree to return to tramping and spy on the tramps using the railroad, as well as the private policemen who were supposed to be enforcing the anti-tramp rules. After a month of this, he decided he could do the job while riding in comfort as a passenger.

After several years of experience as a vagrant, he had published Tramping with Tramps in 1899, a picaresque study. His further works dealing with the lower and criminal classes include The Powers that Prey (1900), a collection of short stories written in collaboration with Alfred Hodder (writing pseudonymously as Francis Walton), Notes of an Itinerant Policeman (1900), The World of Graft (1901), a volume of short stories, and The Little Brother (1902), his only sustained attempt in fiction. His name is perpetuated in the annals of fiction as the dedicatee of Jack London's The Road.

Willard had been a heavy smoker since the age of nine and a long-time alcoholic. At age thirty-seven he contracted pneumonia. He was in Chicago for Cosmopolitan, working on a story about pool gambling when he fell ill, locked himself in a hotel room, and stayed until he died on January 20, 1907. He was buried at Rosehill Cemetery.
