= Mike Brodie =

American photographer

Brodie on a "Z" Train in New Mexico, US

Michael Christopher Brodie (born 1985), also known as the "Polaroid Kid" or "Polaroid Kidd", is an American photographer. From 2004 to 2008, Brodie freighthopped across the US and photographed people he encountered, largely train-hoppers, vagabonds, squatters, and hobos. He has published A Period of Juvenile Prosperity (2013), Tones of Dirt and Bone (2015), Polaroid Kid (2023), and Failing (2024).

== Life and work ==
Michael Christopher Brodie was born in 1985 in Mesa, Arizona, the son of Frankie and Gary Brodie. His mother worked most of her life as a maid and caregiver, though is currently a cashier at Walgreens, while his father was in and out of prison Brodie's whole life. In 2000, the Brodie family moved to Pensacola, Florida where Brodie met his first girlfriend who introduced him to the punk rock music scene and the lifestyle therein.

In 2003, while washing dishes at his home, Brodie witnessed a young couple huddled close together on a passing railroad freight car, intrigued by this, Brodie (then aged 18) left home, eventually freighthopping across the US from 2004 to 2008. He photographed his experiences including the people he encountered, largely train-hoppers, vagabonds, squatters and hobos. Initially he used a Polaroid SX-70 given to him by a friend. When Polaroid discontinued SX-70 film around 2005/2006 he swapped to a Nikon F3 and 35 mm film.

His first cross-country trip brought him to Oakland, CA where he met Paul Schiek, founder of TBW Books. Schiek helped Brodie produce two bodies of work from this (latter) period: Tones of Dirt and Bone and A Period of Juvenile Prosperity. Although A Period of Juvenile Prosperity was published and exhibited first, the images in Tones of Dirt and Bone were produced earlier, when Brodie used Polaroid film, before he switched to the 35 mm format of A Period of Juvenile Prosperity. He has said that the "35mm format let me shoot more candidly and truly capture real moments, not staged portraits."

A Period of Juvenile Prosperity was included in lists of best photobooks of 2013 by critic Sean O'Hagan in The Guardian, Clinton Cargill in The New York Times, photographer Alec Soth in The Telegraph, Dazed, Mother Jones and American Photo magazine. Kenneth Baker, writing in the San Francisco Chronicle, listed the A Period of Juvenile Prosperity exhibition at Stephen Wirtz Gallery in his top 10 list for 2013. Vince Aletti in Artforum named Brodie's show in New York as the show of the year, and has said of Brodie's work: "Even if you're not intrigued by Brodie's ragtag bohemian cohort—a band of outsiders with an unerring sense of post-punk style—the intimate size and warm, slightly faded color of his prints are seductive. His portraits . . . have a tender incisiveness that is rare at any age." Martin Parr and Gerry Badger include the book in the third volume of their photobook history, writing that "what makes this book stand out is the quality of the photographs", that they are "unashamedly romantic and warm toned".

In 2009, Brodie attended and graduated from the Nashville Auto-Diesel College, in Nashville, TN, with goals of attaining a career in that field. After A Period of Juvenile Prosperity was released in 2013, Brodie said he was giving up photography. However, in an interview in 2021 he said he was taking pictures again. Brodie explained "My camera's kind of always been around, there was just a break in my mid to late 20s. I decided I wanted to get into the trades, I didn't want to be an artist by trade. So I went to diesel mechanic school." As of 2017 Brodie was working as a diesel mechanic for the Union Pacific Railroad, along with his wife, who works as a conductor.

== Publications ==
- Tones of Dirt and Bone.
  - Subscription Series #1. Oakland, CA: TBW, 2006. Edition of 500 copies. Brodie, Paul Schiek, Ari Marcopolous and Jim Goldberg each had one book in a set of four.
  - Santa Fe, NM: Twin Palms, 2015. ISBN 978-1936611102. Edition of 3000 copies.
- A Period of Juvenile Prosperity. Santa Fe, NM: Twin Palms, 2013. ISBN 978-1-936611-02-7. Available in a first edition, a second edition of 3000 copies, and a third edition.
- Polaroid Kid. Stanley Barker, 2023. Boxed set of 50 reproduction Polaroids.
- Failing. Twin Palms, 2024. ISBN 978-1-936611-23-2.
- The Slack Trilogy. Lato Paper, 2025.

== Exhibitions ==
=== Solo exhibitions ===
- Tones of Dirt and Bone, M+B Gallery, Los Angeles, CA, 2006
- Paris International Photo Fair, Carrousel du Louvre, Paris, 2006
- Homesteadaz, Get This! Gallery, Atlanta, GA, 2007
- Ridin' Dirty Face, Needles and Pens, San Francisco, CA, 2007
- Tones of Dirt and Bone, Bonni Benrubi Gallery, New York, 2007
- A Period of Juvenile Prosperity, Yossi Milo Gallery, New York, 2013; M+B Gallery, Los Angeles, CA, 2013; Stephen Wirtz Gallery, San Francisco, CA, September–November 2013
- Get This! Gallery, Atlanta, GA, 2013
- Public Land gallery, Sacramento, CA, May–June 2019. New photographs.
