= Carol Gorman =

American writer

- Born: Carol Johnson; February 16, 1952 (age 74); Iowa City, Iowa, USA
- Occupation: Writer
- Spouse: Ed Gorman (m. 1982; died 2016)
- Writing career
- Genre: Children's fiction
- Website: carolgorman.com

Carol Gorman (born February 16, 1952) is an American writer of children's fiction. She originally aspired to be an actress, and for a few years taught seventh grade at an Iowan middle school. Inspired by her husband and fellow author, Ed Gorman, she began writing in the mid-1980s. With over 22 books published under several names, Carol Gorman continues to write and teach.

== Personal life ==
Gorman was born Carol Maxwell in Iowa City, Iowa, the daughter and second child of a pediatrician and a homemaker. She was raised there with her sister and two brothers. Growing up, Carol was drawn to performing. She dreamed of becoming an actress, and while studying at the University of Iowa, was cast in the lead of both West Side Story and Peter Pan. Her dreams of performing seemed to end with her college education, after which she became a teacher at a school in Iowa where she taught seventh grade. In the 1980s, she married a writer by the name of Edward Gorman, who inspired Carol to write.

== Career ==
Gorman began writing when her husband read letters that she had sent to her siblings and suggested she would make a good writer. As he was already a published writer, Carol took his suggestion and began writing. She turned to books to teach her how to do so effectively, and wrote two books before getting published. There are now has at least 22 books published either under her own name, or the pseudonym, Jane Ballard. She has also worked as a ghost writer for other authors.

One of the many authors who have contributed to the Nancy Drew mystery series under the pseudonym Carolyn Keene (three published 1989/90), Gorman has devoted much of her writing to mystery and suspense novels for children. She conducts writers' workshops at elementary and middle schools, and teaches part-time at Coe College in Iowa.

While most of her books are fiction, "America’s Farm Crisis", a nonfiction book aimed at sixth-grade students has been praised for doing “a commendable job at describing the farm crisis” in America.

Chelsey and the Green-Haired Kid was cited as an outstanding book for the reluctant reader by the American Library Association, earned the Ethical Culture Book Award, was nominated for four state young readers' awards, and was recommended in a Ladies' Home Journal article "How to Get Your Kids to Love Books."

Dork in Disguise won the 2002—South Carolina Association of School Librarians (SCASL) Junior Book Award.

The Gustavus Myers Center for the Study of Bigotry and Human Rights announced its 2005 Outstanding Book Awards and issued an honorable mention to Carol Gorman & Ron Findley for Stumptown Kid.

== Books ==
- America's Farm Crisis - Franklin Watts (New York, NY), 1987
- Chelsey and the Green-Haired Kid - Houghton Mifflin (Boston, MA), 1987
- T. J. and the Pirate Who Wouldn't Go Home - Scholastic (New York, NY), 1990
- It's Not Fair - Concordia Publishing House (St. Louis, MO), 1992 (illustrated by Rudy Nappi)
- The Biggest Bully in Brookdale - Concordia, 1990
- Die for Me - Avon Books (New York, NY), 1992
- Graveyard Moon - Avon Books, 1993
- The Great Director - Concordia Publishing House, 1993 (illustrated by Rudy Nappi)
- Skin Deep - Concordia Publishing House, 1993 (illustrated by Rudy Nappi)
- Nobody's Friend - Concordia Publishing House, 1993 (illustrated by Rudy Nappi)
- The Richest Kid in the World - Concordia Publishing House, 1993 (illustrated by Rudy Nappi)
- Brian's Footsteps - Concordia Publishing House, 1994 (illustrated by Ed Koehler)
- The Taming of Roberta Parsley - Concordia Publishing House, 1994 (illustrated by Ed Koehler)
- Million Dollar Winner - Concordia Publishing House, 1994 (illustrated by Ed Koehler)
- The Rumor - Concordia Publishing House, 1994 (illustrated by Ed Koehler)
- The Miraculous Makeover of Lizard Flanagan - HarperCollins (New York, NY), 1994.
- Jennifer-the-Jerk Is Missing - Simon & Schuster (New York, NY), 1994
- Back from the Dead - Avon Books (New York, NY), 1995
- Vrai Ou Faux - Hachette, 1996
- The Bugman Lives! - 1996 (with R. L. Stine)
- Lizard Flanagan, Supermodel? - HarperCollins (New York, NY), 1998
- Dork In Disguise - HarperCollins, 1999: Children's Choice Award (2001–02) Mark Twain Readers Award (2002), Sequoyah Children's Book Award (2002) Sasquatch Reading Award (2002) Honor Book - Massachusetts Children's Book Award (2003-2004)
- Felonious Felines - Five Star Press (Unity, ME), 2000 (editor with Ed Gorman)
- L'Homme Insecte - 2000
- Dork on the Run - HarperCollins, 2002
- A Midsummer Night's Dork - HarperCollins, 2004
- Games - HarperCollins, 2007
- Stumptown Kid - 2005 (co-author with Ron J. Findley): Paterson Prize for Books for Young People (2006)
