= The Road (London book) =

1907 book by Jack London

- Title page for The Road (1907)
- Author: Jack London
- Language: English
- Genre: Autobiographical memoir
- Published: 1907
- Publication place: United States
- Pages: 224

The Road is an autobiographical memoir by Jack London, first published in 1907. It is London's account of his experiences as a hobo in the 1890s, during the worst economic depression the United States had experienced up to that time. He describes his experiences hopping freight trains, "holding down" a train when the crew is trying to throw him off, begging for food and money, and making up extraordinary stories to fool the police. He also tells of the thirty days that he spent in the Erie County Penitentiary, which he described as a place of "unprintable horrors," after being "pinched" (arrested) for vagrancy. In addition, he recounts his time with Kelley's Army, which he joined up with in Wyoming and remained with until its dissolution at the Mississippi River.

== Film adaptation ==
The 1973 film Emperor of the North Pole, starring Lee Marvin, is loosely based upon The Road by Jack London.
