= Bindle =

Sack stereotypically used by hobos

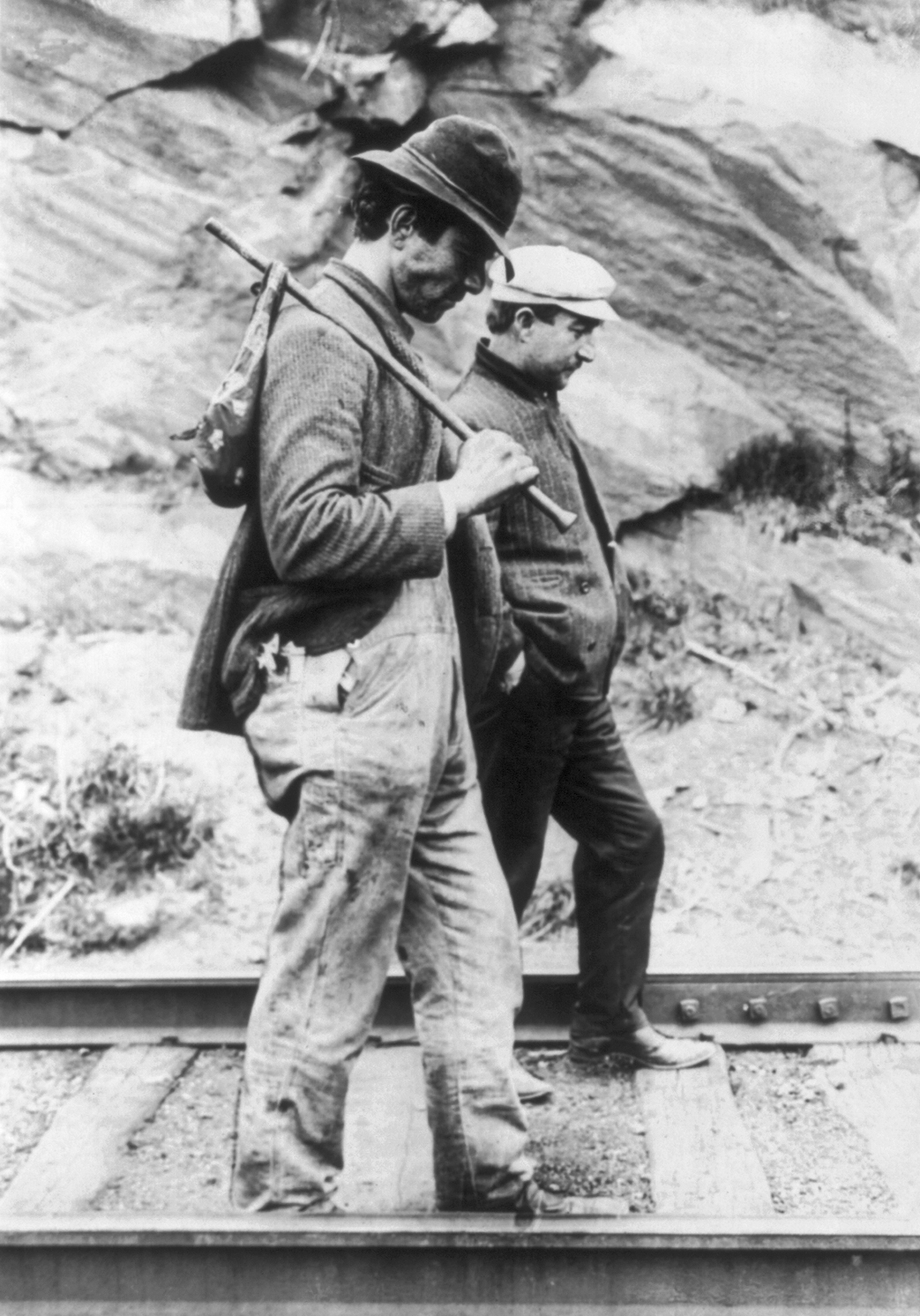
Two hobos walking along railroad tracks after being put off a train. One is carrying a bindle.

A bindle is a small bag or sack used for carrying personal belongings.

Bindles are stereotypically depicted in American culture as a cloth bundle tied to the end of a stick and carried over the shoulder by hobos, especially in imagery of the Great Depression. In this way, the weight of the burden is transferred to the shoulder, which allowed for a longer-lasting and more comfortable grip, which was especially useful with larger and heavier loads. One example of the stick-type bindle can be seen in the illustration entitled The Runaway created by Norman Rockwell for the cover of the September 20, 1958, edition of The Saturday Evening Post.

In cartoons, the bindles' sacks usually have a polka-dot, gingham, or bandanna design. Though bindles are practically gone, they are still widely seen in popular culture as a prevalent anachronism.

== History ==
A hobo who carried a bindle was known as a bindlestiff.

The term bindle may be an alteration of the term "bundle" or similarly descend from the German word Bündel, meaning something wrapped up in a blanket and bound by cord for carrying (cf. originally Middle Dutch bundel). It may also be from the Scottish dialectal bindle "cord or rope to bind things".

Bindle is also a term used in forensics. It is the name for a piece of paper folded into an envelope or packet to hold trace evidence: hairs, fibers or powders. Similarly, bindle is sometimes used to describe a small package of powdered drugs.

== See also ==
- Carrying pole
- Sarcina
