= Harry Kemp =

American poet, author, and vagabond (1883–1960)

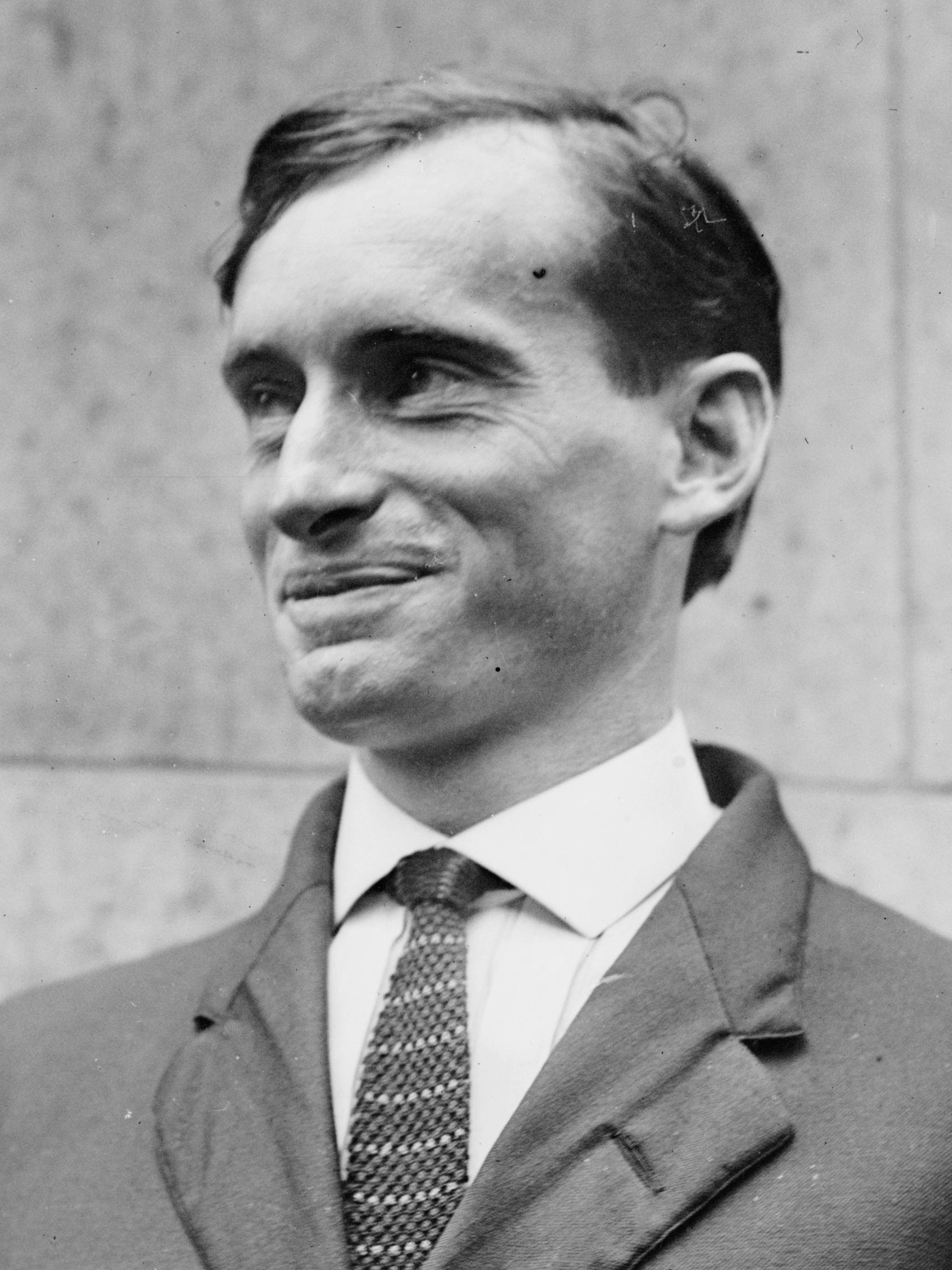
- Born: Harry Hibbard Kemp; December 15, 1883; Youngstown, Ohio, U.S.
- Died: August 5, 1960 (aged 76); Provincetown, Massachusetts, U.S.
- Education: University of Kansas
- Occupations: Poet and author
- Writing career
- Period: 1914–1952

Harry Hibbard Kemp (December 15, 1883 – August 5, 1960) was an American poet and prose writer of the twentieth century. He was known as (and promoted himself as) the "Vagabond Poet", the "Villon of America", the "Hobo Poet", or the "Tramp Poet", and was a well-known popular literary figure of his era, the "hero of adolescent Americans."

== Life and work ==
Kemp was born on December 15, 1883, in Youngstown, Ohio, the only son of a candymaker. He was raised by his grandmother, in a house by the local train yards. At the age of seventeen, he left home to become a common seaman; after returning to the United States he traveled across the country by riding the rails as a hobo. In his early twenties, he attended Mount Hermon School, from which he was expelled around December 1906, and later the University of Kansas. While a student, he began publishing verse in newspapers and magazines.

In 1910, Upton Sinclair and his wife Meta built a house in the single-tax village of Arden, Delaware. In 1911, Sinclair invited Kemp to camp on the couple's land there. Meta soon became enamored with Kemp, and in late August she left Sinclair for the poet. His part in the Sinclairs' divorce became especially notorious in its day.

He spent much of his maturity traveling; he stayed in a number of planned communities for varying lengths of time, then wrote autobiographical novels about his experiences. Kemp's Tramping on Life: An Autobiographical Narrative (1922) was one of the best selling "tramp autobiographies" of the 1900–1939 period. When not traveling he was a regular denizen of Greenwich Village in New York City and Provincetown on Cape Cod in Massachusetts, where he was associated with the Provincetown Players. There is a street named for him, Harry Kemp Way, in Provincetown. Harry Kemp was also known as the "poet of the dunes." Kemp lived on and off in a shack in the dunes of Provincetown, Cape Cod for a period of about 40 years, and he died there in 1960. A 1934 Kemp poem titled, "The Last Return," was written for the Coast Guard men who steadfastly worked to save the lives of those shipwrecked on Cape Cod's coast. Kemp had a knack for self-promotion, what he called "the Art of Spectacularism," and early learned to collaborate with and manipulate journalists to attract attention to his work. He spent time in Paris in the early 1920s, along with the more famous members of the Lost Generation.

Kemp knew many of the bohemian and progressive literary and cultural figures of his generation, including Elbert Hubbard, Upton Sinclair, Ida Tarbell, Bernarr MacFadden, Sinclair Lewis, Max Eastman, Eugene O'Neill, Edmund Wilson, John Dos Passos, E. E. Cummings, and many others. Kemp played a role in the first stage production of O'Neill's earliest play, Bound East for Cardiff. Kemp was physically imposing, "Tall, broad-shouldered, and robust," and gained a reputation as a lover, sometimes of other men's wives; he was involved in various scandals throughout his career.

In addition to his original books, Kemp translated a play by Tirso de Molina as The Love-Rogue (1923), and edited The Bronze Treasury (1927), "an anthology of 81 obscure English poets." Kemp's views turned somewhat more conservative with age; he rejected leftist and anarchist sympathies and wrote approvingly of Jesus as the "divine hobo" and the "super tramp."

Kemp's reputation had declined into obscurity by the time of his death in 1960.

== Critical opinion ==
According to Louis Untermeyer (editor of Modern American Poetry), Kemp's early collections (The Cry of Youth, The Passing God) are "full of every kind of poetry except the kind one might imagine Kemp would write. Instead of crude and boisterous verse, here is precise and over-polished poetry." Untermeyer's opinion was that Chanteys and Ballads is "riper", with "the sense of personality more pronounced."

== Selected works ==
- The Cry of Youth (1914)
- The Thresher's Wife (1914)
- The Passing God: Songs for Lovers (1919)
- Chanteys and Ballads: Sea-Chanteys, Tramp-Ballads and Other Ballads and Poems (1920)
- Tramping on Life: An Autobiographical Narrative (1922)
- Boccaccio's Untold Tale and Other One-Act Plays (1924)
- More Miles: An Autobiographical Novel (1926)
- Sea and the Dunes and Other Poems (1926)
- Don Juan's Note-Book (1929)
- The Golden Word (1930)
- Love Among the Cape Enders (1931)
- Mabel Tarner, An American Primitive (1936)
- The Poet's Life of Christ (1946)
- Provincetown Tideways (1948)
- Poet of the Dunes (1952)
