= Britt, Iowa =

- City
- Interactive map of Britt, Iowa
- Country: USA
- County: Hancock

Area
  - Total: 1.36 sq mi (3.53 km^{2})
  - Land: 1.36 sq mi (3.53 km^{2})
  - Water: 0 sq mi (0.00 km^{2})
- Elevation: 1,227 ft (374 m)

Population (2020)
  - Total: 2,044
  - Density: 1,500.3/sq mi (579.28/km^{2})
- Time zone: UTC−6 (Central (CST))
  - Summer (DST): UTC−5 (CDT)
- ZIP Code: 50423
- Area code: 641
- FIPS code: 19-08605
- GNIS feature ID: 2393421
- Website: City of Britt, Iowa Website

Britt is a city in Hancock County, Iowa, United States, and is the home of the National Hobo Convention and the Hobo Museum. The population was 2,044 at the 2020 census.

== History ==
A train depot was built at Britt in 1870, with tracks running from east to west through the town. The first train line running through the town was the Chicago, Milwaukee & St. Paul line, followed by the Iowa, Chicago and Eastern line. As of 2019, the Canadian Pacific Railway runs through the town, mostly carrying grain.

Britt was platted in 1878. It is believed to be named for a railroad engineer or brakeman. Britt was incorporated as a city on June 23, 1881.

Hobos have convened in Britt since 1900 for the National Hobo Convention, which celebrates the history of hobos and their way of life through contests, craft shows, communal eating, and a parade.

== Geography ==
According to the United States Census Bureau, the city has a total area of 1.26 square miles (3.26 km^{2}), all land.

=== Climate ===
According to the Köppen Climate Classification system, Britt has a hot-summer humid continental climate, abbreviated "Dfa" on climate maps.

Climate data for Britt, Iowa, 1991–2020 normals, extremes 1897–2020
Month	Jan	Feb	Mar	Apr	May	Jun	Jul	Aug	Sep	Oct	Nov	Dec	Year
Record high °F (°C)	65 (18)	63 (17)	83 (28)	94 (34)	108 (42)	104 (40)	109 (43)	111 (44)	101 (38)	93 (34)	79 (26)	67 (19)	111 (44)
Mean maximum °F (°C)	42.3 (5.7)	47.1 (8.4)	66.4 (19.1)	79.6 (26.4)	88.1 (31.2)	91.4 (33.0)	91.7 (33.2)	89.4 (31.9)	87.3 (30.7)	81.2 (27.3)	65.3 (18.5)	47.4 (8.6)	92.3 (33.5)
Mean daily maximum °F (°C)	23.7 (−4.6)	27.9 (−2.3)	41.1 (5.1)	56.5 (13.6)	69.1 (20.6)	79.3 (26.3)	82.4 (28.0)	79.5 (26.4)	73.4 (23.0)	59.7 (15.4)	43.2 (6.2)	29.8 (−1.2)	55.5 (13.0)
Daily mean °F (°C)	15.0 (−9.4)	19.1 (−7.2)	31.9 (−0.1)	45.4 (7.4)	58.3 (14.6)	68.8 (20.4)	72.2 (22.3)	69.4 (20.8)	61.9 (16.6)	48.6 (9.2)	34.0 (1.1)	21.3 (−5.9)	45.5 (7.5)
Mean daily minimum °F (°C)	6.3 (−14.3)	10.3 (−12.1)	22.7 (−5.2)	34.3 (1.3)	47.6 (8.7)	58.4 (14.7)	62.0 (16.7)	59.2 (15.1)	50.3 (10.2)	37.4 (3.0)	24.7 (−4.1)	12.9 (−10.6)	35.5 (1.9)
Mean minimum °F (°C)	−14.2 (−25.7)	−10.1 (−23.4)	1.4 (−17.0)	20.9 (−6.2)	33.7 (0.9)	46.7 (8.2)	51.9 (11.1)	49.3 (9.6)	35.6 (2.0)	22.9 (−5.1)	7.9 (−13.4)	−7.8 (−22.1)	−14.7 (−25.9)
Record low °F (°C)	−36 (−38)	−34 (−37)	−26 (−32)	5 (−15)	19 (−7)	32 (0)	41 (5)	30 (−1)	20 (−7)	−3 (−19)	−17 (−27)	−27 (−33)	−36 (−38)
Average precipitation inches (mm)	0.77 (20)	1.48 (38)	2.14 (54)	3.88 (99)	4.48 (114)	5.41 (137)	4.24 (108)	3.57 (91)	3.21 (82)	2.56 (65)	1.43 (36)	1.13 (29)	34.3 (873)
Average snowfall inches (cm)	10.7 (27)	7.2 (18)	3.7 (9.4)	1.7 (4.3)	0.0 (0.0)	0.0 (0.0)	0.0 (0.0)	0.0 (0.0)	0.0 (0.0)	0.4 (1.0)	2.3 (5.8)	10.8 (27)	36.8 (92.5)
Average precipitation days (≥ 0.01 in)	6.9	5.9	7.5	10.7	13.3	11.8	10.1	9.6	9.2	8.4	6.6	7.4	107.4
Average snowy days (≥ 0.1 in)	5.6	4.3	2.2	0.9	0.0	0.0	0.0	0.0	0.0	0.4	2.3	5.4	21.1
Source 1: NOAA
Source 2: National Weather Service

== Demographics ==
Historical populations
Year	Pop.	±%
1880	345	—
1890	818	+137.1%
1900	1,540	+88.3%
1910	1,303	−15.4%
1920	1,619	+24.3%
1930	1,593	−1.6%
1940	1,813	+13.8%
1950	1,908	+5.2%
1960	2,042	+7.0%
1970	2,069	+1.3%
1980	2,185	+5.6%
1990	2,133	−2.4%
2000	2,052	−3.8%
2010	2,069	+0.8%
2020	2,044	−1.2%
Source: "U.S. Census website". United States Census Bureau. and Iowa Data Center; Source: U.S. Decennial Census

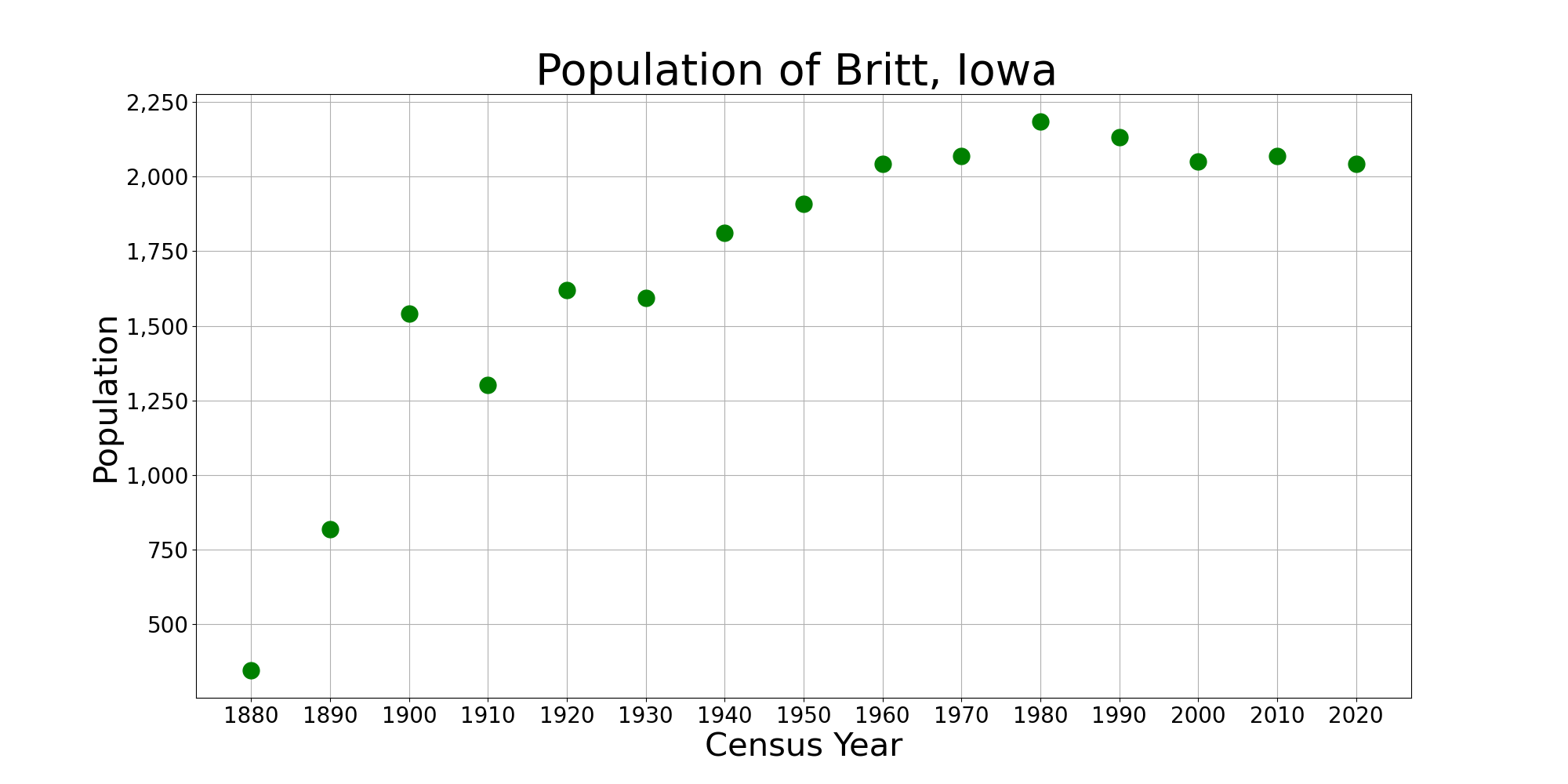
The population of Britt, Iowa from US census data

=== 2020 census ===
As of the 2020 census, there were 2,044 people, 891 households, and 533 families residing in the city. The population density was 1,500.3 inhabitants per square mile (579.3/km^{2}). There were 959 housing units at an average density of 703.9 per square mile (271.8/km^{2}).

The median age in the city was 47.8 years. 20.4% of residents were under the age of 18, 22.5% were under the age of 20, and 30.0% were 65 years of age or older. 3.9% of residents were between the ages of 20 and 24, 20.5% were from 25 to 44, and 23.2% were from 45 to 64. For every 100 females there were 92.8 males, and for every 100 females age 18 and over there were 90.9 males. The gender makeup of the city was 48.1% male and 51.9% female.

Of households, 23.6% had children under the age of 18 living with them. Of all households, 46.6% were married-couple households, 7.2% were cohabitating-couple households, 18.5% had a male householder with no spouse or partner present, and 27.7% had a female householder with no spouse or partner present. 40.2% of all households were non-families. 35.4% of all households were made up of individuals, and 21.3% had someone living alone who was 65 years of age or older.

Of housing units, 7.1% were vacant. The homeowner vacancy rate was 1.9% and the rental vacancy rate was 5.2%.

0.0% of residents lived in urban areas, while 100.0% lived in rural areas.

Racial composition as of the 2020 census
Race	Number	Percent
White	1,833	89.7%
Black or African American	26	1.3%
American Indian and Alaska Native	4	0.2%
Asian	5	0.2%
Native Hawaiian and Other Pacific Islander	1	0.0%
Some other race	36	1.8%
Two or more races	139	6.8%
Hispanic or Latino (of any race)	176	8.6%

=== 2010 census ===
As of the census of 2010, there were 2,069 people, 886 households, and 547 families living in the city. The population density was 1,642.1 inhabitants per square mile (634.0/km^{2}). There were 979 housing units at an average density of 777.0 per square mile (300.0/km^{2}). The racial makeup of the city was 93.1% White, 0.3% African American, 0.1% Native American, 0.6% Asian, 4.5% from other races, and 1.3% from two or more races. Hispanic or Latino of any race were 7.7% of the population.

There were 886 households, of which 28.1% had children under the age of 18 living with them, 50.9% were married couples living together, 7.9% had a female householder with no husband present, 2.9% had a male householder with no wife present, and 38.3% were non-families. 35.1% of all households were made up of individuals, and 19.1% had someone living alone who was 65 years of age or older. The average household size was 2.27 and the average family size was 2.94.

The median age in the city was 43.7 years. 24.6% of residents were under the age of 18; 4.7% were between the ages of 18 and 24; 22% were from 25 to 44; 24.7% were from 45 to 64; and 24% were 65 years of age or older. The gender makeup of the city was 46.5% male and 53.5% female.

=== 2000 census ===
As of the census of 2000, there were 2,052 people, 873 households, and 552 families living in the city. The population density was 1,680.5 inhabitants per square mile (648.8/km^{2}). There were 930 housing units at an average density of 761.6 per square mile (294.1/km^{2}). The racial makeup of the city was 94.7% White, 0.1% Native American, 0.2% Asian, 4.8% from other races, and 0.2% from two or more races. Hispanic or Latino of any race were 5.8% of the population.

There were 873 households, out of which 28.1% had children under the age of 18 living with them, 53.4% were married couples living together, 7.0% had a female householder with no husband present, and 36.7% were non-families. 34.1% of all households were made up of individuals, and 19.0% had someone living alone who was 65 years of age or older. The average household size was 2.28 and the average family size was 2.93.

In the city, the population was spread out, with 24.3% under the age of 18, 6.3% from 18 to 24, 23.4% from 25 to 44, 21.2% from 45 to 64, and 24.8% who were 65 years of age or older. The median age was 42 years. For every 100 females, there were 88.1 males. For every 100 females age 18 and over, there were 83.1 males.

The median income for a household in the city was $33,150, and the median income for a family was $41,495. Males had a median income of $28,027 versus $20,611 for females. The per capita income for the city was $16,130. About 5.7% of families and 8.2% of the population were below the poverty line, including 10.2% of those under age 18 and 9.5% of those age 65 or over.

== Education ==
West Hancock Community School District operates public schools in Britt. The district formed on July 1, 1994 with the merger of the Britt and Kanawha districts.

== Notable people ==
- Josephine Gruhn, Iowa state representative
- John Hammill, governor of Iowa
- Dustin Honken, convicted murderer
- Cul Richards, collegiate athletics coach

== In popular culture ==
Britt is mentioned as being the location of a prom in the song "Prom Night" by The Perfect Theory, written by Adam Young of Owl City fame.
