= Stumptown Kid =

2005 children's book by Carol Gorman and Ron J. Findley

- Cover
- Author: Carol Gorman, Ron J. Findley
- Language: English
- Publisher: Peachtree
- Publication date: 2005
- LC Class: PZ7.G6693 St

Stumptown Kid is a children's novel by Carol Gorman and Ron J. Findley, first published in 2005 by Peachtree.

== Synopsis ==
In a small Iowa town in 1952, eleven-year-old Charlie Nebraska, whose father died in the Korean War, learns the meanings of both racism and heroism when he befriends a black man who had played baseball in the Negro leagues.

== Main characters ==
Charlie Nebraska: An eleven-year-old boy whose dad died in the Korean war. He likes to play baseball but doesn't make the community team, the Wildcats.

Will Draft: Charlie's best friend. Will plays baseball for the Wildcats.

Brad Lobo: Also plays for the Wildcats. He is a bully and hates Charlie.

Luther Peale: Charlie's friend and dad. Former player in the Negro leagues but hurt his arm after pitching the ball that killed Ruckus Brody's Brother.

== Reception ==
John Peters, for The Booklist called the book "competent, if unexceptional", remarking all characters fall nicely on good and bad stereotypes, which might be attractive for young readers.

In her review, Sharron McElmeel gives high praise for how Stumptown Kid authors tackled the subject of racism in a small community, as well as for having elements of action and mystery. McElmeel also says that the book "brings many opportunities to stimulate readers' curiosity and engage the reader in history." The presence of "[t]hemes of honesty, loyalty, and heroism" were also pointed out by Gerry Larson in his review for the School Library Journal. Larson also calls the story "powerful" and "fastpaced", concluding by saying: "Readers will enjoy this winning mix of sports, suspense, and heroism".

== Awards and accolades ==
- 2005-06 Pennsylvania Young Adult Top Forty List
- Kansas State Reading Circle 2005 Recommended Reading List. Listed in the Kansas National Education Association "Reading Circle Catalog.
