= Frederick Niven =

Scottish-Canadian journalist and novelist

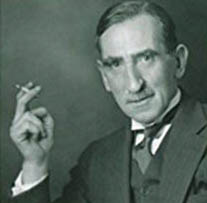
- Born: March 31, 1878; Valparaíso, Chile
- Died: January 30, 1944 (aged 65); Vancouver, British Columbia, Canada
- Occupations: Journalist, writer
- Writing career
- Period: 20th century
- Genres: Fiction, poetry, journalism

Frederick John Niven (March 31, 1878 – January 30, 1944) was a Canadian novelist of Scottish heritage. A prolific author, he produced over thirty works of fiction, an autobiography, poetry, essays, and pieces of journalism.

== Biography ==
=== Early life ===
Niven was born in Valparaíso, Chile, on 31 March 1878, the youngest of three children. His father manufactured sewed muslin, while his mother was a Calvinist born in Calcutta. When he reached school age, he accompanied his mother to Scotland. He was educated at Hutcheson's Grammar School, Glasgow, where his heart trouble prevented him from swimming. First employed in his father's factory, he later worked as a librarian in Glasgow and Edinburgh, and also had employment in a jewelry shop. He attended the Glasgow School of Art during the evening for two years. On the advice of a doctor, in his late teens Niven moved to the drier climate of the Okanagan Valley in British Columbia. He worked on a railroad near Savona and dug ditches in Vancouver. When he was twenty years old, he spent a summer tramping in southern British Columbia, later portrayed in Wild Honey. His return to Scotland was aboard a cattleboat from Montreal, a setting recreated in S. S. Glory (1915).

After his arrival, he contributed western sketches to the Glasgow Weekly Herald, and later, to The Pall Mall Magazine, eventually becoming a journalist. His first novel, Lost Cabin Mine (1908), was a Western published serially in The Popular Magazine. His second, The Island of Providence (1910), a historical romance of 17th century Devon, contained scenes replete with pirates and buccaneers. His first foray into realistically depicting Scottish life was A Wilderness of Monkeys (1911).

In 1911, Niven married Mary Pauline Thorne-Quelch, a journalist fifteen years his junior. In 1912 and 1913 the couple spent several months travelling in Western Canada prior to returning to London before WWI. Niven was rejected for military service due to his heart condition. He spent the war working for the Ministry of Food and the War Office. This period, the years 1913 to 1920, was most productive, and included the publication of Justice of the Peace (1914), which many, including his wife, consider to be his finest novel. His first volume of poetry, Maple Leaf Songs, appeared in 1917.

=== British Columbia ===
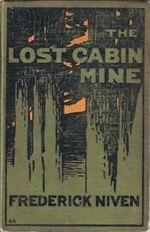
Frederick Niven's first novel, The Lost Cabin Mine (1908).

In 1920, Niven and his wife settled permanently on Willow Point, near Nelson, British Columbia, on the shores of Kootenay Lake. Starting in this decade, Niven traveled extensively, learning sign language from the Blackfoot people at Calgary, and also went farther abroad, to South America, the Yukon, and Hawaii. The year 1923 saw the publication of the Western The Wolfer, a novel Niven described as written partly for fun and partly for money. He produced articles for Canadian Magazine, The Dalhousie Review, and Saturday Night. He now solely lived by his writing. In 1927, he published Wild Honey (UK Queer Fellowes), an account of hobo life, which the writer Charles Lillard later described as one of three best early novels of British Columbia. Two years later, he put forth a pair of non-fiction books, The Story of Alexander Selkirk, and Canada West, a historical account of western Canada. One disadvantage of living in British Columbia was that his reputation in England began to decline.

The 1930s witnessed some of Niven's best Scottish novels, including The Three Marys (1930), The Paisley Shawl (1931), and the Staff at Simson's (1937). The first novel in his Canadian historical trilogy, The Flying Years, appeared in 1935. He collaborated with the artist Walter J. Phillips to produce Colour in the Canadian Rockies (1937). Niven published in 1938 a series of autobiographical essays entitled Coloured Spectacles. His trilogy continued with Mine Inheritance (1940), and the posthumously published The Transplanted (1944).

Due to repeated heart attacks, Niven first moved to Nelson, and in 1943 to Vancouver. He died there on January 10, 1944. He is buried in Nelson, British Columbia. In 1946 his headstone was provided by the City of Glasgow, and the memorial tablet by the Canadian Authors Association. The Frederick Niven Literary Award, given for outstanding contribution to literature by a Scot, is named after him.

== Criticism ==
The Canadian literary critic Northrop Frye considered Niven to be a "writer of brilliant promise". He was reviewed favourably by Hugh Walpole, Christopher Morley, Rebecca West, and Katherine Mansfield. However, he never reached the top echelon of either Scottish or Canadian authors. His first novels were influenced by Robert Louis Stevenson and the hero of penny dreadfuls, Deadwood Dick. The quality of his works varied greatly, several being nothing more than potboilers. Niven's literary reputation rested mainly on his early novel The Justice of the Peace. His Scottish novels are thought to be superior to his Canadian ones. The critic Edward McCourt ascribed this to Niven's emigration to Canada in middle age, and imperfect assimilation of the mores of his new home.

Niven was a careful stylist, and his writing showed qualities of wit, humanity, and intelligence. His ability to write memorable poetic descriptions has been remarked upon. The plots in his Scottish novels are not well developed, relying rather on an evocation of character and atmosphere. Despite the diligent sourcing of historical data, Niven's Canadian trilogy is marred by frequently wooden characters. One noted structural defect in The Flying Years is the too rapid passage of time, making it seem episodic. The latter novel is the only one of Niven's works to be included in the New Canadian Library series.

== List of works ==
- The Lost Cabin Mine (1908) - novel set in British Columbia
- The Island Providence (1910) - historical novel set partly in Caribbean
- A Wilderness Of Monkeys (1911) - Scottish novel
- Dead Men's Bells (1912) - Scottish & pirate novel set in 18th century
- Above Your Heads (1912) - short stories
- Hands Up! (1913) - novel set in United States
- Ellen Adair (1913) - Scottish novel
- The Porcelain Lady (1913) - Scottish novel
- Justice Of The Peace (1914 & 1923) - Scottish novel
- The SS Glory (1915) - novel set on a cattleboat from Montreal to Liverpool
- Cinderella Of Skookum Creek (1916) - novel set in western North America
- Two Generations (1916) - Scottish novel
- Sage Brush Stories (1917) - short stories
- Maple Leaf Songs (1917) - poetry
- Penny Scot's Treasure (1918) - novel set in western Canada
- The Lady Of The Crossing (1919) - novel set in British Columbia
- A Tale That Is Told (1920) - Scottish novel
- The Wolfer (1923) - novel set in western United States
- Treasure Trail (1923) - novel set in British Columbia and Washington State
- A Lover Of The Land, And Other Poems (1925) - poetry
- Queer Fellows (title in US: Wild Honey) (1927) - autobiographical account set in British Columbia
- Canada West (1929 & 1930) - non-fiction account of western Canada
- The Story Of Alexander Selkirk (1929) - non-fiction
- The Three Marys (1930) - principally Scottish novel
- The Paisley Shawl (1931) - Scottish novel
- The Rich Wife (1932) - Scottish novel
- Mrs Barry (1933) - Scottish novel
- Triumph, (1934) - novel set in South America and Scotland
- The Flying Years (1935) - historical novel set in Manitoba
- Old Soldier (1936) - Scottish novel
- The Staff At Simson's (1937) - Scottish novel
- Colour In The Canadian Rockies [with Walter J. Phillips] (1937) - non-fiction
- Coloured Spectacles (1938) - autobiographical essays
- The Story Of Their Days (1939) - Scottish novel
- Mine Inheritance (1940) - historical novel set in Manitoba
- Brothers In Arms (1942) - historical novel set in 18th century Glasgow and Virginia
- Under Which King (1943) - historical novel with a Jacobite setting
- The Transplanted (1944) - historical novel set in British Columbia
