= Arthur Kylander =

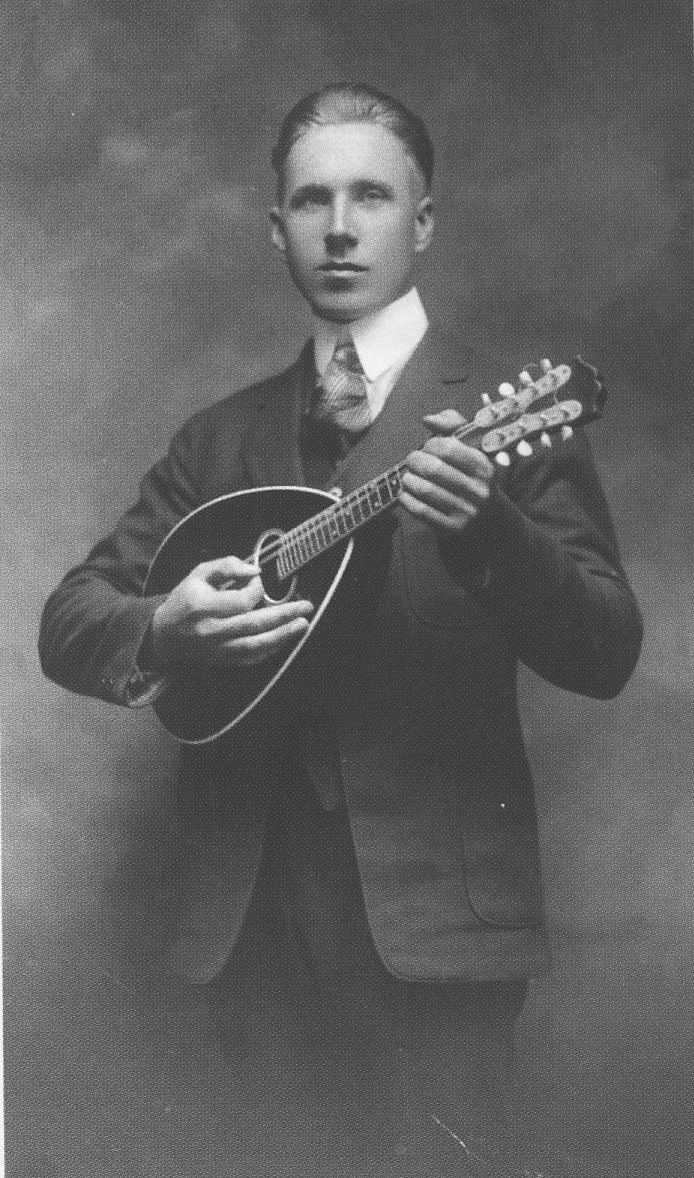
- Born: Arthur Arkadius Kylander; February 16, 1892; Lieto, Finland
- Died: September 23, 1968 (aged 76); Placerville, California
- Occupations: singer, songwriter, musician
- Spouse: Julia Varila

Arthur A. Kylander (February 16, 1892 – September 23, 1968) was a Finnish-American singer, songwriter, and mandolin player.

== Biography ==
Born in Lieto, Finland, Kylander immigrated to the United States in 1914 at the age of twenty-two. There he became an itinerant laborer and worked as a carpenter and logger.

In 1925 he met his future wife Julia Varila, a pianist and accordionist with whom he began performing and touring. During the Depression the Kylanders moved to Hollywood, California, where Julia worked as a cook and Arthur was a butler and chauffeur. In 1943 they bought 240 acres of wooded land near Placerville, California and started a tree farm. In 1964 Kylander was named the Outstanding Conservation Rancher of the Year.

Kylander died in 1968 in Placerville.

== Music ==
Between 1927 and 1929 Kylander released twenty songs on the Victor label. He also published several songbooks with the title Humoristisia Lauluja (Comic Songs).

His repertoire included Kulkuri (The Hobo), Muistojen Valssi (The Waltz of Memories), and Suomalainen ja Sauna (The Finn and the Sauna). A member of the Industrial Workers of the World, many of Kylander's songs dealt with the hardships facing immigrant workers while retaining a strong sense of wit and humor. He sang in a mixture of Finnish and Finglish in a manner similar to his contemporary Hiski Salomaa.

Since the 1970s, Arthur Kylander's recordings have been reissued in both analog and digital formats.
