= Freighthopping =

Act of surreptitiously boarding and riding a railroad freight car

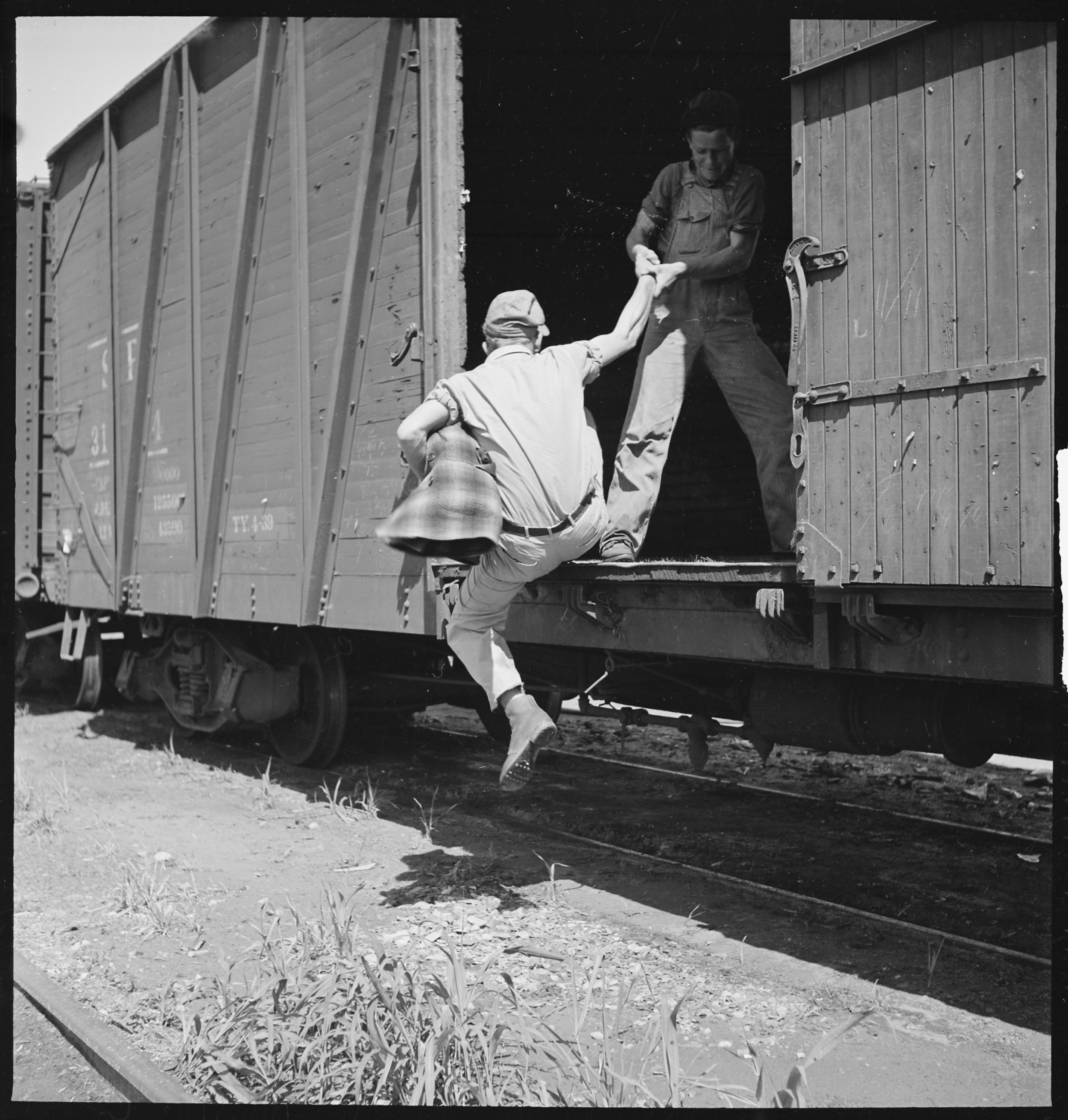
Freight-hopping youth near Bakersfield, California (National Youth Administration, 1940)

Freighthopping or trainhopping is the act of boarding and riding a freightcar without permission. This activity itself is often considered to be illegal, although this varies by jurisdiction. It may be associated with other illegal activities such as theft, vagrancy, or trespassing.

Train surfing is a similar activity that involves the act of riding on the outside of a moving train, tram or another rail transport, without paying a due fare.

== History ==
For a variety of reasons the practice is less common in the 21st century, although a community of freight-train riders still exists.

Riding on the rooftop of a hopper car

Typically, hoppers will go to a rail yard where trains stop to pick up and unload freight and switch out crew. They will either board a freight car in some fashion unseen or "catch one on the fly" once it has begun to move.

== Dangers ==
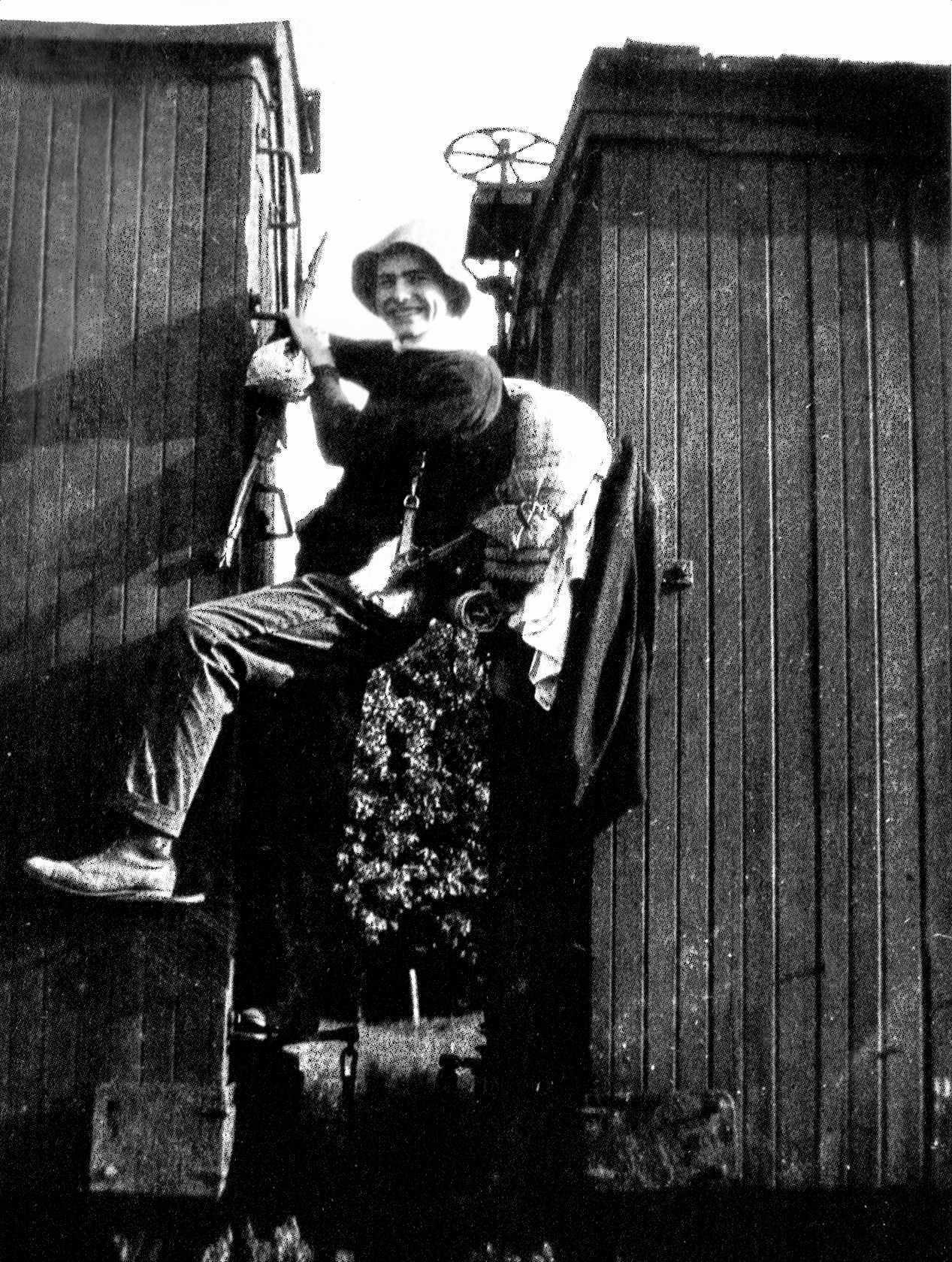
Ernest Hemingway hopping a freight train to get to Walloon Lake (1916)

Riding outside a freight car, whether atop or underneath, is dangerous.

== Today ==
Hopping trains happens all over the world in various styles, and practices and legal penalties vary by region. Some places are more critical and consider freight hopping a crime, and other places are more lenient.

=== Europe ===
Freight-hopping exists in various countries and across borders, including the Eurostar and Eurotunnel Shuttle as a route for migrants to cross the English Channel from France into England.

=== United States ===
Union Pacific Railroad in the United States encourages people who witness transients on freight trains to report them to its dispatch center. According to a sheriff's deputy from Lincoln County, Nebraska, train hoppers no longer write symbols on trees and buildings, but there is still a network of train hoppers that occurs mostly online.

=== Australia ===
Australia has a small community of freight-hoppers, consisting mainly of teens and young adults, who hop for various reasons, including familial breakdown, homelessness, and more. They are found mostly in the major cities, and lines, such as the Brisbane–Sydney line, and other major freight routes. The community is very tight, and difficult to research. Most media regarding modern hopping in Australia is private, or difficult to find at best.

=== Mexico ===
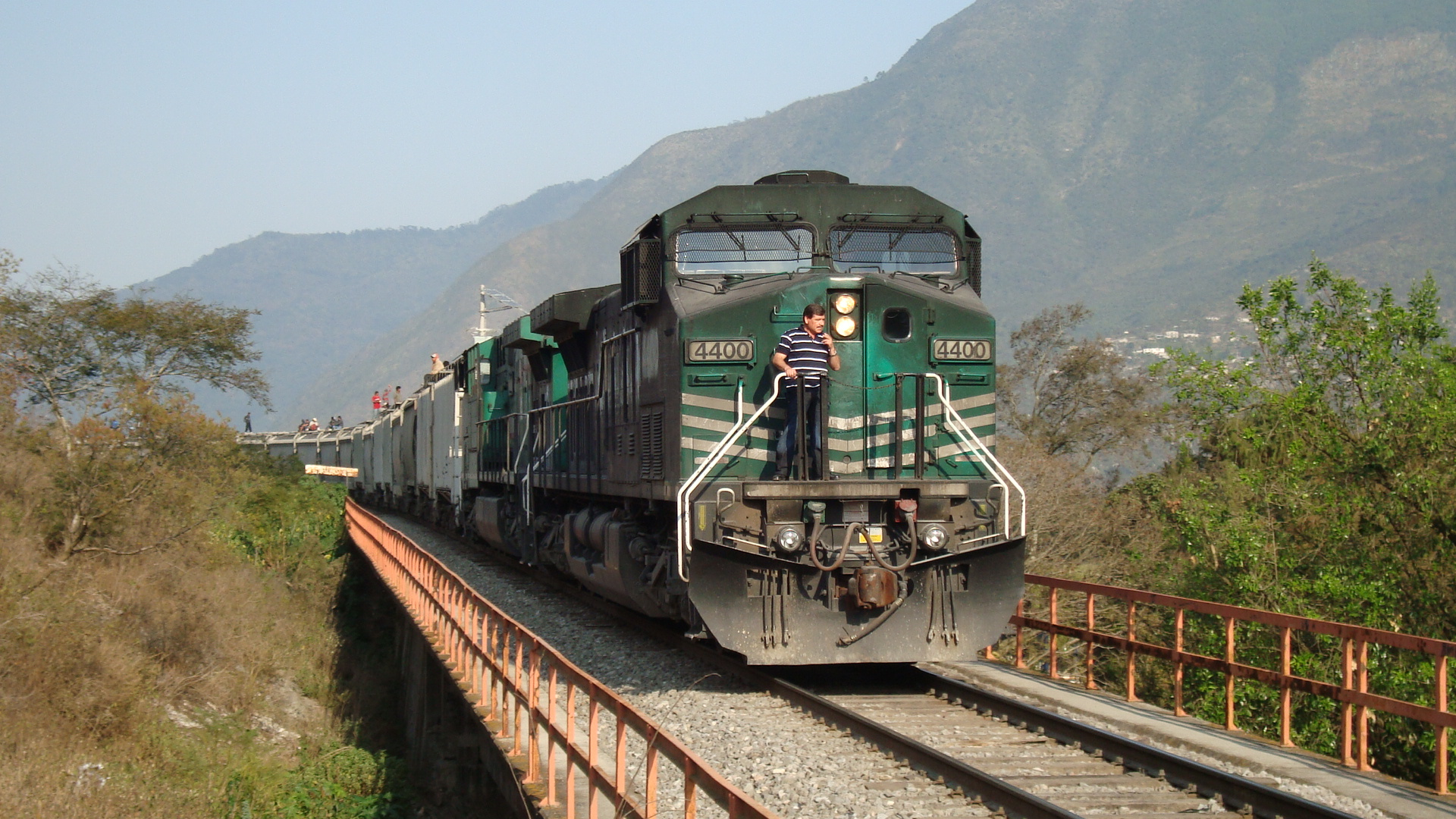
A freight train with freight hoppers in Mexico

It is estimated that yearly between 400,000 and 500,000 migrants—the majority of whom are from El Salvador, Guatemala, and Honduras—hop freight trains in the effort to reach the United States. The freight trains are known as La Bestia.

=== Mauritania ===
In the Mauritania Railway, freighthoppers can ride with their cargo freely due to the lack of road between Zouérat and Nouadhibou.

== See also ==
- Mike Brodie, freighthopping photographer
- W. H. Davies, the "tramp-poet"
- Ben Reitman, the "hobo doctor"
