= Tennis strategy =

Methods of utilizing strengths and weaknesses

Players use different strategies while playing tennis to enhance their own strengths and exploit their opponent's weaknesses in order to gain the advantage and win more points.

Players typically specialize or naturally play in a certain way, based on what they can do best. Based on their style, players generally fit into one of three types: baseliners, volleyers, or all-court players. Many players have attributes of all three categories but, at times, may also focus on just one style based on the surface, or on the condition, or on the opponent.

A baseliner plays from the back of the tennis court, around/behind/within the baseline, preferring to hit groundstrokes, thereby allowing themselves more time to react to their opponent's shots, rather than to come up to the net (except in certain situations). Many modern professional players employ this style most of the time.

A volleyer plays nearer towards the net, preferring to hit volleys, whereby providing their opponent less time to react to their shots, rather than to stay/play from further back on the tennis court (except in certain situations). Many classic traditional players employed this style the best in the past.

All-court players fall somewhere in between, employing both baseliner strategies and volleyer strategies depending on the situations.

A player's weaknesses may also determine strategy. For example, most players typically have a stronger forehand shot and will therefore favor the forehand and often re-balance their posture and re-adjust their position by "running around" a more logical backhand cross-court to enable them to hit an inside-out forehand instead. Conversely, some players with a more dominant backhand shot will switch their stance, change their hand grip, and with "quick footwork" hit a backhand down-the-line instead of a more convenient inside-in forehand.

== Baseliner ==
=== Offensive baseliner ===
An offensive or aggressive baseliner tries to control and dictate play by hitting powerful groundstrokes for winners usually from the area of the baseline or behind it. An effective offensive baseliner can overpower many opponents; however, when going for winners, they can also produce many errors since they have to repeatedly and correctly execute some difficult strokes, such as down-the-line winners landing near the corner. Fatigue, loss of focus, mis-hitting the ball, and hesitating are some reasons for errors. Two great old-time players, R. Norris Williams and Ellsworth Vines, were famous for being unbeatable when their strokes were "on". However, they played with such little margin for error in making their strokes that when they were making more mistakes they could be beaten by other players. Another advantage of this strategy is that the player can weaken his opponent's confidence by successfully landing difficult shots which in turn may increase his own confidence.

Hard courts are generally considered to be the best surface for an offensive baseliner who often hit higher risk shots. However, offensive baseliners can often excel on both grass and clay courts as well. On grass, they can execute their "winners" and the fast, low bounce makes it harder for opponents to retrieve; whereas on clay courts, some offensive baseliners might like the slow and high bounce because it gives them a longer time to change their grip and foot-positions in order to set up for an offensive shot or winner. Offensive baseliners with height especially have an advantage on clay courts because the high bounces land in their hitting zones, allowing them to strike the ball cleanly and more powerfully such as Ana Ivanović. At 6 ft 0 in (183 cm), she took advantage of the high bounces on the clay courts that led to back-to-back French Open finals in 2007, and a crown in 2008. Maria Sharapova, who is 6 ft 2 in (188 cm), had the hardest hit backhand at the women's 2013 French Open, when she punished a first serve from Jelena Janković, producing a backhand return winner.

Successful pioneers of this style include Steffi Graf and Monica Seles on the women's side and Andre Agassi and Jim Courier on the men's. Serena Williams is also known for excelling with this style. Maria Sharapova is another aggressive baseliner who excelled by generating powerful strikes on both wings, and was regarded as one of the best during her era. Novak Djokovic is also a notable offensive baseliner, with his powerful and precise backhand which is widely regarded as the best backhand in the men's game. Serena Williams is considered the greatest offensive baseliner in women's tennis history due to her powerful serve and powerful forceful groundstrokes.

=== Defensive baseliner ===
A defensive baseliner, or retriever, tries to return every ball and relies on the opponent making mistakes. The trademarks of a defensive baseliner include consistent shots with low error rate, as well as precise placement that makes it hard for their opponent to execute an aggressive shot. A variant of this type of player, called a counterpuncher, additionally tends to have excellent anticipation and passing shots, enabling them to convert many defensive situations into offensive ones. A retriever may also decide to almost never get on the offensive. Such players' game relies on physical endurance and willingness to get every ball back in play and wear out the opponent, as well as restraint to avoid impatience or trying for too much. Their game plan often involves outmaneuvering opponents and moving them around the court. For example, former world number one Caroline Wozniacki moves her opponent around the court without going for high-risk winners. While on defense, she gets most balls back and constantly mixes up the pace to frustrate her opponents.

While they tend to make relatively few errors because they do not attempt the ambitious shots of the aggressive baseliner, an effective counterpuncher must be able to periodically execute an aggressive shot using sharp angles, precise placement, and their opponent's pace. Agility is key for the counterpuncher, as well as a willingness to patiently chase down every ball to frustrate opponents. Returning every aggressive shot often causes their opponents to make further errors as they attempt increasingly difficult, higher-risk shots. However, for some faster players, including Gaël Monfils, Gilles Simon, Lleyton Hewitt and Andy Murray, standing too deep behind the court can hinder their attacking abilities.

At lower levels, counterpunchers often frustrate their opponents so much that they may try to change their style of play due to ineffective baseline results. Counterpunchers are often particularly strong players at low-level play, where opponents cannot make winners with regularity. At higher levels, the all-court player or aggressive baseliner is usually able to execute winners with higher velocity and better placement, taking the counterpuncher out of the point as early as possible.

Counterpunchers often, but not always, excel on slow courts, such as clay. The court gives them extra time to chase down shots, and it is harder for opponents to create winners. However, some counterpunchers who have the ability to mix up their game and turn defense into offense, like Lleyton Hewitt, Andy Murray, and Agnieszka Radwańska, have also excelled on faster hard and grass courts.

== Volleyer ==
An aggressive volleyer has a great net game, is quick around the net, and has fine touch for volleys. Serve and volleyers come up to the net at every opportunity when serving, both as a tactical play or a strategic play. They are almost always attackers and can hit many winners with varieties of volleys, drop volleys, half volleys, smashes, touch shots, block shots, lobs, squash shots, etc. When not serving, they often employ the "chip-and-charge", chipping back the serve without attempting to hit a winner and rushing the net. The serve-and-volleyers' strategies and tactics are to put pressure on the opponent to try to hit difficult passing shots. This strategy is extremely effective against pushers.

Serve-and-volleyers benefit from playing on fast courts, such as grass or fast concrete. The quick bounce and faster pace of play give them an advantage because opponents have less time to set up for a passing shot. However, the number of serve-and-volley players is decreasing in today's professional tennis, because this strategy requires more experience to master and defeat other playing styles (as well as changes in racquet technology that have improved players' passing shots). In addition to this, there has been a trend toward the slowing down of tennis surfaces over the past few years. The serve-and-volley technique works better on faster surfaces because the volleyer is able to put more balls away without the baseliner being able to chase them down. Although serve and volleyers may be a dying breed, there are still some great players who employ this tactic. The Frenchman Michaël Llodra has been considered by many to be the best pure serve and volleyer of today's game. Other notable volleyers of the past and present, includes Roy Emerson, Goran Ivanišević, Nicolas Mahut, Rajeev Ram, Ivo Karlović, Milos Raonic, John Isner.

Bill Tilden, the dominant player of the 1920s, preferred to play from the back of the court, and liked nothing better than to face an opponent who rushed the net – one way or another Tilden would find a way to hit the ball past him. In his book Match Play and the Spin of the Ball, Tilden propounds the theory that by definition a great baseline player will always beat a great serve-and-volleyer. Some of the greatest matches of all time have pitted great baseliners such as Björn Borg, Mats Wilander, Andre Agassi against great volleyers such as John McEnroe, Boris Becker, Stefan Edberg, Pete Sampras.

Some players, such as Feliciano López, Tommy Haas, Roger Federer and Andy Roddick will only employ this strategy on grass courts or as a surprise tactic on any surface. Roger Federer commonly used the serve-and-volley tactic against Rafael Nadal, to break up long rallies and physically taxing games.

== All-court player ==
All-court players, all-rounders, all-courters, have aspects of every tennis style, whether that be offensive baseliner, defensive counter-puncher or aggressive serve-and-volleyer. All-court players use the best bits from each style and mix it together to create a complete tennis style. In game situations they are very versatile; when an all-court player's baseline game is not working, he/she may switch to a net game, and vice versa. All-court players have the ability to adjust to different opponents that play different styles more easily than pure baseliners and true volleyers with an adaptive change in strategies and tactics even during the gameplay. All-court players typically have the speed, determination and fitness of a defensive counter-puncher, the confidence, skill and flair of an offensive baseliner, as well as the touch, the agility around the net and the tactical thinking of an aggressive volleyer.

However, just because the all-court player has a combination of skills used by all tennis styles does not necessarily mean that they can beat an offensive baseliner or a defensive counter-puncher or even an aggressive volleyer. It just means it would be more difficult to read the game of an all-court player.

== Serving strategy ==
Winning your service game is the most important part of tennis. Holding serve dictates the flow of a match and provides a significant advantage for a player until they get to a tiebreak at 6 games all, of which factors such as luck and experience determine who wins the set or match since both players do not serve as many consistent points in a tiebreak as they do in a game. In a tiebreak, one player serves first and then it alternates from then with 2 consecutive serve points each until someone wins by a score of 2 points in a race to 7 points.

Maintaining your serve allows a player to keep the pressure on their opponent, and in professional tennis, most matches are often decided by who can break serve. If a player consistently holds serve, it gives them the foundation to look for opportunities to break their opponent's serve, which can be the key to winning sets and matches.

To hold serve, serves must be accurately placed, and a high priority should be placed on first serve percentage. In addition, the velocity of serve is important. A weak serve can be easily attacked by an aggressive returner. The first ball after the serve is also key. Players should serve in order to get a weak return and keep the opponent on the defense with that first shot. For example, following a wide serve, it is ideal to hit the opponent's return to the open court.

=== Types of serve ===
There are three different types of serves and each one of them can be used in different situations. Those are slice serve, kick serve, and flat serve.

==== Slice serve ====
The slice serve works better when the player tosses the ball to the right and immediately hits the outer-right part of the ball. This serve is best used when you hit it wide so you get your opponent off the court

==== Kick serve ====
To achieve a good execution, the player must toss the ball above the head and immediately spin the bottom-left part of the ball. Since the ball is tossed above the head, it is necessary for the player to arch correctly under the ball. This serve is best used as second serve because the amount of spin that is added to the ball makes it very safe. The kick serve is also effective when a change of rhythm is needed or when the opponent struggles with the high bounce that results from the effect.

==== Flat serve ====
To execute this serve, the player must toss the ball right in front and immediately hit the middle-top part of the ball. This is usually a very hard serve and therefore risky. However, if the flat serve is executed with enough power and precision, it can turn into a great weapon to win points faster.

== Doubles strategy ==
Though strategy is important in singles, it is even more important in doubles. The additional width of the alleys on the doubles court has a great effect on the angles possible in doubles play. Consequently, doubles is known as a game of angles.

There are three basic doubles strategies:

- both-up strategy (also called "two-up" strategy)
- up-and-back strategy (also called "one-up/one-back" or "I" strategy)
- both-back strategy (also called "two-back" strategy)

=== Both-up strategy ===
The ideal is both-up strategy, often called "Attacking Doubles" because the net is the "high ground", and the both-up strategy puts both players close to it, in a position to score because of their excellent vantage points and angles. A team in the both-up formation, however, is vulnerable to a good lob from either opponent at any time. To be successful with Attacking Doubles, teams must have effective serves and penetrating volleys to prevent good lobs and good overhead shots to put away poor returns.

Teams that play attacking doubles try to get into the both-up formation on every point. When serving, their server follows most first serves to the net and some second serves. As a result, attacking doubles is also called serve-and-volley doubles. When receiving, their receiver follows most second-service returns to the net.

At the professional level, attacking doubles is the standard, though slowly degrading, strategy of choice.

=== Up-and-back strategy ===
At lower levels of the game, not all players have penetrating volleys and strong overhead shots. So, many use up-and-back strategy. The weakness in this formation is the large angular gap it creates between partners, a gap that an opposing net player can easily hit a clean winner through if they successfully poach a passing shot.

Nonetheless, up-and-back strategy is versatile, with elements of both offense and defense. In fact, since the server must begin each point at the baseline and the receiver must be far enough back to return the serve, virtually every point in doubles begins with both teams in this formation.

Teams without net games strong enough to play Attacking Doubles can still play both-up when they have their opponents on the defensive. To achieve this, a team would patiently play up-and-back for a chance to hit a forcing shot and bring their baseliner to the net.

Australian Doubles and the I-Formation are variations of up-and-back strategy. In Australian doubles, the server's partner at net lines up on the same side of the court, fronting the opposing net player, who serves as a poaching block and blind. The receiver then must return serve down the line and is liable to have that return poached. In the I-Formation, the server's net partner lines up in the center, between the server and receiver to be able to poach in either direction. Both Australian Doubles and the I-Formation are poaching formations that can also be used to start the point for serve-and-volley doubles.

=== Both-back strategy ===
Both-back strategy is strictly defensive. It is normally seen only when the opposing team is both-up or when the returner is passing the net player on the return. This might be a good tactic when the opponent has a serve with a lot of pressure and an aggressive player at the net. From here the defenders can return the most forcing shots till they get a chance to hit a good lob or an offensive shot. If their opponents at net become impatient and try to angle the ball away when a baseliner can reach it, the defender can turn the tables and score outright. However, this strategy leaves the volley court open to drop shots from the opposition.

== See also ==
- Tennis terminology
- Tennis shots
- Tennis technology
- Tennis injuries
- Tennis statistics
- Other Forms
