= Tennis games =

Tennis games are often used to help players of all abilities to practice the different strokes involved in tennis. The number of participants needed varies from as few as two players to as many players as can fit on a tennis court. These games are often used by coaches and other tennis instructors to help teach the basic skills of tennis.

== Singles games ==
Singles games are games that practice the strategies used when playing a match of singles.

=== One Ball Live ===
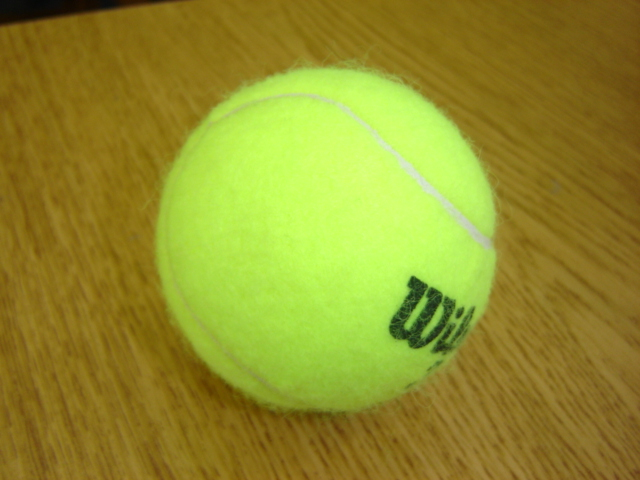
A tennis ball

At least eight players are needed for this game. Two players start on the baseline, the back line of the tennis court, of each side with the court split in half vertically. Two tennis balls are played simultaneously on each half of the court starting with a drop hit. A drop hit is an underhand hit by bouncing the ball first. Once one player loses a point on his or her side of the court, they call out “One ball live!” and the single remaining ball is played out among the four players with the court no longer split down the middle. The team that wins this point stays, while two new players on the other side replace the losing team and the game starts over with two balls. The first team to reach ten points wins. This game is designed for use in practicing groundstrokes, the forehand and backhand, at first and then doubles strategy once "One ball live" is called.

=== Tag Team Singles ===
This game format can also be used when the number of players drops to 4 in the game "Around the World". At least four players are needed for this game. Players are split into two teams. Each team lines up behind the middle of the baseline. One player from each team will start the game off and step up to the baseline. Either player can start the point. Once a player has hit the ball, he or she goes to the end of their line and the next player in line will hit their team's next shot. The same happens for the other team. The rally continues until one team makes a mistake. This version is designed to work on consistency in the players ground strokes.

=== Relay or Tag Tennis ===
Relay / Tag Tennis is a tennis game that encourages teamwork and participation at all levels. It can be played as singles or doubles, on any size of court and at any level of play.

Players are split into two teams. Each team lines up behind the baseline, or somewhere on the court that is safe. One player from the serving team starts the game and plays the point according to existing and traditional rules and etiquette of tennis. Every player or doubles pair plays out at least one whole rally. Once a player has played their rally/rallies, they go to the end of their line and the next player in line plays their team's next point/rally.

Scoring can be traditional (15/30/40/Deuce/Advantage/Game), Tie Break, Ping Pong or any net/wall game scoring format. To ensure every player/doubles pair faces every opponent player/team, when the number of players/teams on opposite sides is equal, the serving team should stay on for two points/rallies, while the receiving team stay on for one point/rally.

Any existing tournament and league competition infrastructure can be used to run a Relay / Tag tennis competition.

=== King of the Court ===
Three or more players are needed for this game. One person, designated as the “king” or “queen,” goes to the opposite side of the court. The other players make a line behind the baseline of the current side. One challenger steps up and plays a singles point against the “king.” The point is started with either a serve or a drop hit. If the challenger wins, they replace the “king” on the other side of the court. Variations of this game include the challenger having to win two or three points in a row. This game practices playing a singles point.

=== Champs and Chumps ===
Six or more players are needed for this game. An equal number of players line up behind each baseline. One side is designated the chumps while the other is designated the champs. A player from each line steps up and plays out a singles point. The point is started with either a drop hit or a serve. The winner of the point goes to the end of the champs’ line while the loser goes to the end of the chumps' line. The game is played for a designated time, and once time is called, the players on the champs side are the winners. This game practices playing a singles point.

=== On-Off Singles ===
This was designed when there is a lack of courts. If singles is preferred, over doubles with 4 players. 2 players face off in a separate match and the other 2 have a separate match. The two matches share the court with each match alternating play per point. (two people play their singles point, then alternate as the other two players play their singles point).

== Doubles games ==
Doubles games are games that practice the different strategies used in a match of doubles.

=== Team Doubles ===
Six or more players are needed for this game. Four players line up in the typical doubles starting positions. The typical doubles starting positions are with one player serving and his partner on the other side of his side of the court at the net. The returning team has a player at the service line in front of the server and a player at the baseline on the other side of the court. The other players wait to play in a line behind the serving or returning players. One team serves the ball and the point is played out. Once the point is over, each side of the court rotates. On the serving side: the server rotates to the net position, the net player sits out, and a new player steps in to serve the ball. On the returning side: the return player rotates to the service line, service line player sits out, and a new player steps in to return the ball. The same team serves the ball until the game is over. The game is played until a team reaches seven or eleven points. Variations in the game include a drop hit to start the point or a coach feeding the ball to start the point. This game is designed to give each player practice at all the doubles positions.

=== All Position Doubles ===
Eight or more players are needed for this game. Four players start the first point in the normal doubles starting position. A line of one or more players is to the side of each starting position. The first point is played. Once finished, the first four players rotate in a clockwise direction to the end of the next line. Four new players play out the next point and then rotate in the same manner. The first person to win a total of 10 points wins the game. This game is designed to give each player practice at all the doubles positions.

=== King of the Court Doubles ===
Six or more players are needed for this game. One team of two players is designated as the “kings” or “queens” and goes to one side of the court. The other players make a line behind the baseline of the opposite side. One challenging team steps up and plays a doubles point against the “kings.” The point is started with either a serve or a drop hit. If the challengers win, they replace the “kings” on the other side of the court. Variations of this game include the challengers having to win two or three points in a row. This game practices playing a point of doubles.

=== Rush N' Crush ===
This game either requires an even number of players 4 or more, or any number of players more than 2 along with an individual ball feeder. The game is traditionally played with doubles teams. A doubles team is designated the rulers and begins on the baseline on the opposite side of the court. The feeder is positioned behind the rulers with respectable space to the rulers for mobility (at least 10 feet behind the line). The other doubles teams are the challengers and take turns on the opposite side of the court with a goal to win 3 points in a row to replace the current rulers. As each point begins, the rulers begin at the baseline, but are free to move anywhere once the point begins. The first point begins with the feeder feeding a short ball to the challengers allowing them to proceed to the net and an offensive. If the challengers win the first point, they remain at the net for the beginning of the next two points (they are allowed free mobility after the point begins). The feeder will randomly designate one player on the challengers team to receive an overhead (a short lob allowing the player to hit a powerful shot similar to a serve from the net), or a volley. With the third point, the other of the two challengers receives an overhead or a volley. If all three points are won the challengers take the place as the new rulers and the previous rulers proceed to the challenger's side. After a certain time, end game may be called and the current rulers are designated as the winners (The power to call end game may go to the feeder). This game was designed to train and encourage aggressiveness and a goal in doubles to move to the net to finish the point. It also trains groundstrokes volleys, and overheads, along with possible use of slices and drop-shots. A super-shot rule may also be put into effect. Here, a feeder may decide at a random time (either

or 3rd point) to drive a volley between the two challengers. If neither player touches the ball it is called a super-shot and the challengers could be penalized (may run laps, do pushups etc.). With this rule, the game also trains communication between a doubles.

=== Triples ===
Players are divided into teams of three to six players. Each team forms a triangle on each side of the court with one person at the net. Extra players wait behind the baseline. A ball is fed by a coach or player that is sitting out and the point is played using the doubles court. Once the point is over, players rotate clockwise on their respective sides. If there are more than three players, rotate players in and out. The first team to ten points wins. This game is designed to help the net player become more aggressive at the net.

=== Monkey in the Middle ===
This game is played in triples formation (a triangle with two players behind the baseline and the third in the team at the net). The game can be played with a feeder positioned off of the court, usually by the net, or without the feeder. A point is begun by feeding the ball to one of the baseline players on either team. The point is played out. Each point is worth one point. If the net player (also known as the monkey), hits a winner, the player earns his/her team 2 points. The next point is begun with a ball being fed to the opposite side of the team that just won the point(s). Games are played to any score 10n + 1 (ex: 11, 21, 31 etc.).

=== Deep Desperation ===
Two players go to the baseline of one side of the court as the champs. Two other players go to the net on the opposite side of the champs. These are the challengers. The other players wait at the side of the net post in pairs ready to replace the challengers. The coach lobs a ball over the challenger's heads and the challengers have to run down the lob and play out the point (after it bounces). If the challengers win the point, they replace the champs and the old champs go to the end of the challengers line. If they lose, they go to the back of the challenger's line at the net post. This game is designed to practice running down a lob and getting back into the point. This game is also designed to promote net play and aggressiveness, and shot placement.

=== Wipe Out ===
Players are divided into two teams and wait with one team behind each baseline. One player from each team steps up and a singles point is played out starting with a drop hit. The person that wins adds another player from their team to the court while the player that loses goes to the end of their line and a new player replaces him or her. This next point is played one vs. two with the team with only one person on the court starting the ball. The team with one person on the court can use the doubles court while the team with multiple people on the court has to use the singles court. If the team with two people on the court wins, they add another player and play one vs. three. If they lose, all players on the court on that team go to the end of the line and one player replaces them. The other team, the winning team, adds another player to the court. If playing against one player, singles court must be used. If playing against two or more players, doubles court can be used. The game continues until an entire team is on the court and wins the point. This game is designed to practice ball placement.

=== Around the World ===
Four or more players are needed for this game. The players are split up evenly on each side of the court and line up behind the baseline. One player from each side steps up to the baseline. Either player feeds the ball and runs to the end of the line on the other side of the court. The person that receives the feed hits the ball and also runs to the end of the line on the other side of the court. The next person in line will hit the next shot and so on. The point continues until an error is made. This process is repeated. Once a person has made three errors, he or she sits out. The last person to make three errors wins. Once the game is down to two people, instead of running to the other side, the person has to hit the ball, drop their racquet, spin around, and continue the point. This game is designed to practice hitting that first shot of each point without first being in a rhythm.

=== Touch the Curtain ===
This game requires that there is a wall behind both baselines on the court. 4 individual players take the court with 2 on each side positioned at the baseline. Any extra players will line up by the net post as substitutes. The game also requires a feeder, one who will stand out of the game with a large basket of balls quickly putting a new ball into play once the previous ball is out of play. When the game begins, the 4 players on the court rally the ball back and forth with freedom of mobility and aggressiveness. Each player's main goal is to not be eliminated from the game by falling to a winner (a ball that bounces on the player's court twice). When an individual player mishits the ball, the player is substituted with the next person in line while the feeder immediately puts a ball into play to the opposite (unharmed) side. When a winner is hit, the player within whose court the ball lands (half the court being divided vertically as well), this player is eliminated from the game (it is also popular that a super-shot, or a winner hit through the middle of the court without a definite decision to which player is eliminated, results in both players on that side being eliminated from the game). As more eliminations occur the number of substitutes decrease. When only 4 players remain in the game (no substitutes) a mistake is penalized with the player running back and touching the wall behind the baseline while a ball is put into play in the opposite side allowing the other duo to hit a winner. With 3 players remaining, the same rules apply but the single player only needs to defend a singles court. When 2 players remain, they can decide between themselves to touch the wall, or any other penalty (Dropping the racquet and spinning a full circle is a popular penalty). With that set rule, the 2 players play on a complete singles court until one player remains to be designated the winner. Once a new game begins, the highest ranking players from the previous game usually begin as the substitutes with the winner substituting last, and the runner-up substituting next to last etc. This game is designed to work on the advanced skill of consistency after running to a shot, shot placement, and builds stamina.

== See also ==
- USTA's Top 10 Games Every Coach Should Know
- Tennis
- Tennis technology
- Tennis injuries
- Tennis statistics
