= King of the Court =

King of the Court or Queen of the Court might refer to:

- A competition format in sports such as;
  - Basketball
  - Pickleball
  - Racquetball
  - Tennis
- Tobio Kageyama, a character in the Haikyu!! manga and anime series

== See also ==
- King of the hill (game)
