= Tennis injuries =

Injuries related to playing Tennis

Tennis injuries include a wide range of acute and overuse conditions affecting the upper body, trunk, and lower body. Common tennis injuries include lateral epicondylitis (tennis elbow), rotator cuff and labral shoulder injuries, lumbar stress injuries, patellar tendinopathy, ankle sprains, and triangular fibrocartilage complex (TFCC) wrist injuries. These injuries can result in a long period of time away from competition and often require rehabilitation, physical therapy, or surgery. The most frequent injuries in players are in the lower body, followed by the upper body and trunk. Acute injuries including ankle sprains happen most often during match play. Overuse injuries, including shoulder injuries, tennis elbow, lumbar stress injuries, and patellar tendinopathy, are associated with repetitive stroke mechanics from tennis. Spondylolysis (Pars Fracture) occurs more often in adolescent tennis players due to repetitive extension and rotation of the spine. Junior elite tennis players have a higher occurrence of stress fractures than professional adults.

== Epidemiology and risk factors ==
Competitive tennis players commonly develop musculoskeletal injuries, with lower body injuries occurring the most frequently, followed by upper body injuries. Acute injuries such as ankle sprains account for a large portion of injuries in competitive matches. Chronic, overuse injuries are more common during training. Repetitive stroke mechanics, including the serve and topspin forehand, contribute to overuse in the upper body, while rapid directional changes and loading contribute to lower body injuries.

Training volume and intensity are major determinants of injury risk, with sudden increases in practice load being associated with higher rates of overuse injury. Competitive athletes experience a higher overall volume of play and a greater proportion of overuse injuries. Age and developmental status affect injury patterns, with younger players being more prone to stress related injuries such as spondylolysis. Junior elite players also have a higher risk of developing stress fractures than professional adults because they often train at a high volume at an early age.

== Types of injuries ==
=== Lateral epicondylitis ===
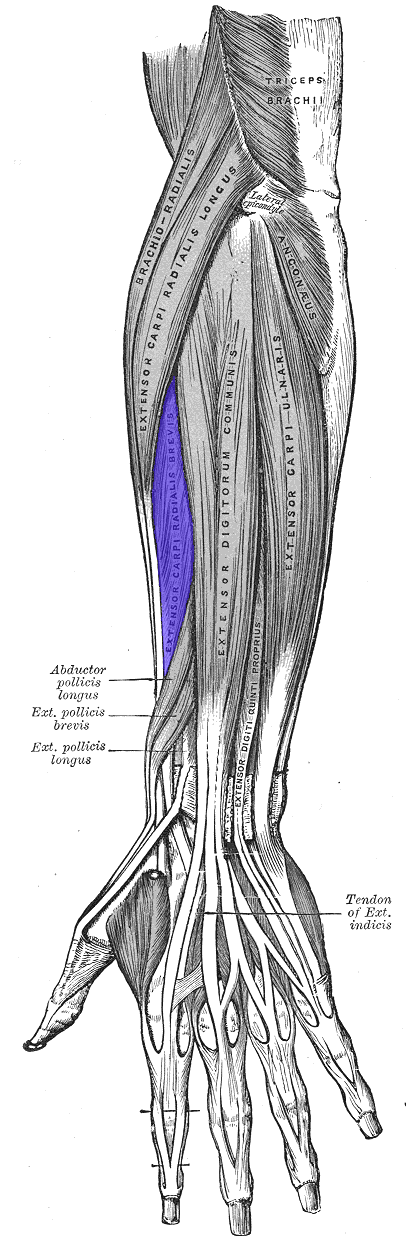
Coloured in purple: the Extensor Carpi Radialis Brevis muscle

Lateral epicondylitis is an overuse injury that frequently occurs in tennis. It is also known as tennis elbow. This injury categorizes as a tendon injury where it occurs in the forearm muscle called the extensor carpi radialis brevis (ECRB). The injury is regularly developed in recreational players. Experienced players are less likely to develop lateral epicondylitis than the inexperienced players due to poorer technique. It is more prominent at the lower levels of play and usually comes from any incorrect use of the wrist or grip on the forehand or one-handed backhand strokes Players at higher levels often have more relaxed grips and have a larger racquet extension out to the ball after they make contact, where professionals have less emphasis on the arm and more on the use of every part of the body in order exert the natural power behind the ball, lower level players don't always receive the training on how to use their whole body for a tennis stroke and are often reduced to using their arms in order to exert all of the power, therefore putting heavy strain on the arm. Holding the grip tightly will put more tension on the arm therefore when going for a swing the muscles will be absorbing all of the shock from the initial contact of the ball. Symptoms of tennis elbow includes slow pain, which occurs around the elbow. Simple tasks such as shaking hands or moving the wrist with force, like lifting weights or doing push ups, will worsen the pain Tennis elbow has actually shown that inflammatory tendons are only part of the early stages or acute stages. Most players respond well to simple rest, but other means of treatment include physical therapy, strength training, and electrical stimulation. Some players will make alterations to their racquet, such as increasing their grip size which will ultimately prevent any unwanted movement of the wrist when extending out and finishing the tennis stroke.

=== Shoulder ===
Shoulder injuries in tennis players result from the repetitive overhead motions used during serving and groundstrokes. when serving and striking the ball. The most frequently reported shoulder injuries in tennis players include rotator cuff tendinopathy, internal impingement, scapular dyskinesis, and labral lesions. A study of competitive junior tennis players (ages 12–19) found that 24% reported current or past shoulder pain, with prevalence rising to about 50% in older player populations.

=== Back ===
Lower back pain is common in tennis and affects players at all levels of play. Lower back pain is attributed to repetitive trunk rotation and extension during the serve, as well as general overuse. According to a study of 148 professional tennis players, back pain forced 39% of players to withdraw from at least one tournament, and 29% reported chronic back pain.

=== Blister ===
Friction blister commonly occur in tennis due to repetitive footwork and shear forces between the skin, sock, and shoe. Blisters are common during long tennis matches. Moisture, heat, and poorly conditioned skin increase the risk of these blisters. Moisture-wicking synthetic socks and cushioned insoles may reduce blister incidence.

=== Leg ===
Tennis leg refers to acute mid-calf pain, most often occurring in middle-aged players. It occurs during knee extension with ankle dorsiflexion. Tennis leg causes immediate calf pain and functional limitations. A full tear of the plantaris tendon is rare, making up only a smaller percentage of cases.

=== Knee ===
Patellar tendinopathy (Jumper's knee) is an overuse injury of the patellar tendon. Reduced flexibility in the quadriceps or hamstrings and variations in lower-limb alignment can increase stress on the patellar tendon. Players typically experience sharp pain at the front of the knee during activities such as serving, sprinting, or pushing off to change direction. Players often experience aching pain after finishing play.

==== Anterior cruciate ligament injuries ====
Anterior Cruciate ligament (ACL) injuries in tennis are relatively uncommon. They most frequently occur in tennis during lunging movements, running toward the net, or while preparing and hitting the overhead smash. A majority of injured players return to tennis after an ACL rupture, but only a minority ever return to their previous performance level.

=== Ankle sprain ===
Ankle sprains are among the most common acute injuries in tennis. These injuries occur when a player lands on the outside of the foot, causing the ankle to turn inward and injuring the lateral ankle ligaments. Symptoms usually include lateral ankle pain, swelling, and discoloration that develop after the injury. These injuries occur across all levels of play and are closely linked to sudden directional changes and landing mechanics that are inherent to tennis movement.

=== Triangular fibrocartilage complex injuries (TFCC) ===
TFCC injuries in tennis players occur from repetitive ulnar side loading of the wrist during topspin, groundstrokes, serve pronation, and deviation. The TFCC gives stability to the DRUJ. Repeated force or loading can cause degeneration or tears in the TFCC of competitive tennis players. Symptoms can include ulnar-side wrist pain and clicking. Pain often increases with gripping, pronation, and supination. Treatment can range from rest and immobilization to surgery.

=== Stress fractures ===
In tennis, stress fractures happen when the bones are repeatedly stressed over time without enough recovery. Typical symptoms include pain that worsens with activity. The most common areas that tennis players experience stress fractures include the tarsal navicular, pars interarticularis of the lumbar spine, metatarsals, tibia, and lunate. These fractures cause major disruption to training and competition, with players needing an average of 15.1 weeks to return to tennis.

== See also ==
- Tennis
- Tennis technology
- Tennis statistics
