= Tennis technology =

Technological advance in tennis

Since the sport's inception, the design and manufacture of tennis equipment has been affected by technological advances and regulations. As is common in major sports, regulations became more exacting over time, with improvements affecting the qualities of the tennis racket and the tennis ball.

== Rackets ==
As materials improved, becoming lighter and stronger, rackets were made larger, accordingly. Larger rackets have more surface area, making them easier for many players to return a ball. Sizes are:

- Mid: 93 square inches (600 cm^{2}) and below
- Mid-plus: 94–105 square inches (610–680 cm^{2})
- Oversized: 106–122 square inches (680–790 cm^{2})
- Super-oversized: 122 square inches (790 cm^{2}) and larger

The balance point and grip size of a racket changed as technology progressed. Depending on the player's style of play, choice is made between a head-heavy racket and a head-light racket. Head-heavy rackets provide more power on serves and ground strokes, while head-light rackets provide more control. Along with racket balance, the size of the grip on the racket can affect play style as well.

=== Materials ===
From the sport's birth in the 1870s until the 1970s nearly all rackets were wooden, made of one or more timbers selected for their particular characteristics. Wood rackets sometimes needed a press to stop the heads warping when not in use. Later designs used metals such as steel, aluminium, magnesium and titanium.

Billie Jean King won the first Grand Slam title ever in 1967 using a racket made out of steel - the Wilson T2000. It was the first time in history that a racket other than wood had been used to win a Grand Slam. Steel rackets had been around since 1922 but were first patented in 1957.

In 1968, Spalding launched an aluminium racket, called the "Smasher". Aluminium is lighter and more flexible than steel, but stiffer – and therefore less accurate – than wood. Because of this, most of the top players still preferred to use wooden frames – and a decade later they were still in use.

=== 1980s graphite introduction ===
In the early 1980s, "graphite" (carbon fibre) composites were introduced, and other materials were added to the composite, including ceramics, glass-fibre, boron, and titanium. The Dunlop Max200G used by John McEnroe from 1983 was an early graphite racket, along with the Prince original graphite. Composite rackets are the contemporary standard; the last wooden racquet appeared at Wimbledon in 1987. Later, people experimented with materials such as boron, ceramics, graphite, and composites. Each material had its own desirable qualities but ceramics and graphite were the best picks for being stiff as well as being good with vibration reduction.

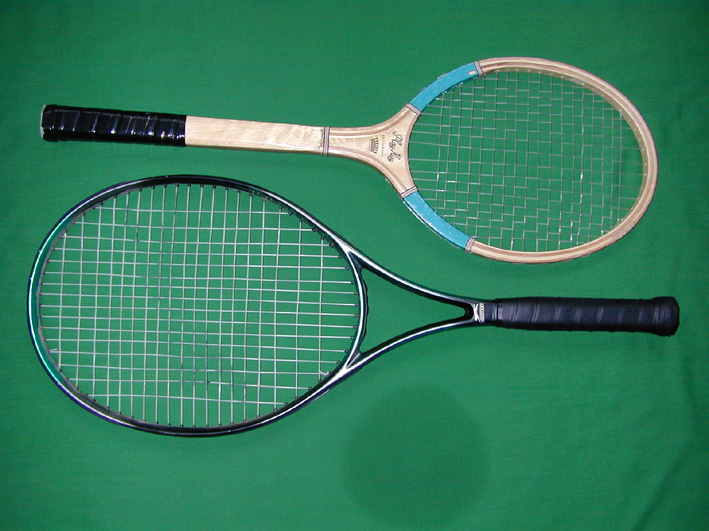
Tennis rackets made of wood and carbon fiber reinforced plastics

=== Strings ===
Pierre Babolat was the inventor of the earliest strings. He produced strings that were made from sheep intestines ("natural gut"). Natural gut was later constructed with cow's intestines and remains one of the high performing strings in the world, still used by some of the greatest players of all time, such as Roger Federer and Novak Djokovic.

In efforts to create a more economical option, synthetic reproductions of gut were made ("syn gut"), generally out of nylon. Synthetic guts are generally defined by their single-cre nylon construction, though technically, multifilament strings, defined by their multi-core construction are also synthetic guts.

In 1991, Luxilon produced the first polyester string, called Big Banger. In 1997, a predecessor string, ALU Power, would win its first grand slam at the French Open in the racquet of Guga Kuerten. These polyester strings offered a few key advantages, from improved control to superior durability, but their primary strength was spin potential, offering such a noticeable advantage over tradition gut that Pete Sampras would dub the string "Cheatalon." Polyester strings are the most popular strings today, both at recreational level and on the professional tour, with recent slam champions, Carlos Alcaraz and Jannik Sinner both choose to exclusively string their racquets with polyester strings.

== Balls ==
Originally the tennis ball consisted of rough cloth strips tightly bound together. Eventually the cloth strips became the core, wrapped in twine and covered by a finer cloth or felt hand-stitched around it. In 1972, at the request of Lamar Hunt to televise World Championship Tennis, the tennis ball was manufactured with the optic yellow felt. Now yellow tennis balls are mass-produced for high performance at minimal costs.

== Electronics Integration ==
The integration of image computation into tennis technology started in 2002 with the ATP and WTA tour's use of the hawkeye system and the US Open's use of hawkeye in 2006. As technology evolved, in 2020 Wimbledon, used the integration of AI through the use of audio sensors and image recognition to generate highlights of match data after each match. However, the US Open in 2020 was the first to use the AI electric line calling system, or Live ELC, that is now used in every grand slam tournament. This image computation system has now replaced human line judges in all grand slams except the French Open, as well as major ATP events.

== See also ==
- Tennis
- Tennis injuries
- Tennis statistics
