= Tennis in Russia =

Tennis was introduced to Russia in the late 19th century. Historically, it was a minor sport in the country, mainly due to its absence from the Olympic Games, as well as poor relations between Russian players and the international tennis community. However, it has gained prominence in recent decades due to the successes of players such as Maria Sharapova. In September 2009, the Russian National Tennis Centre, named after Juan Antonio Samaranch, was established in Moscow.

== History ==
=== Introduction of tennis to Russia ===
Arthur Davydovich McPherson (1870–1920) was the founder and president of the All-Russian Union of Lawn Tennis Clubs, a predecessor of the Russian Tennis Federation. In 1903, he organized the first St. Petersburg tennis championship; four years later, he arranged the first national tournament. McPherson also helped to establish the country's first Olympic Committee. He was awarded the Order of St. Stanislaus by then–emperor Nicholas II for his contribution to the promotion of tennis in Russia. Following the 1917 Revolution, he was imprisoned, later dying from typhus in a Moscow prison.

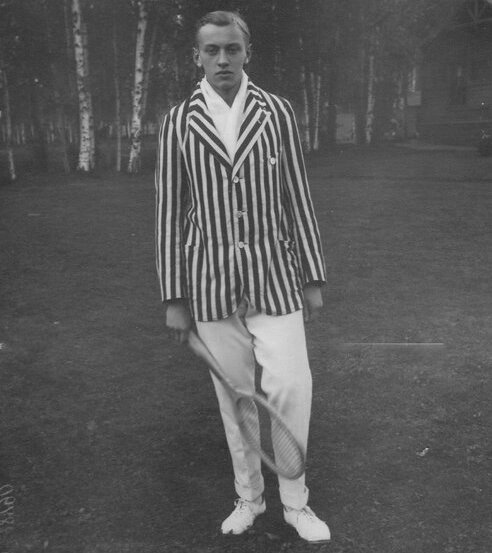
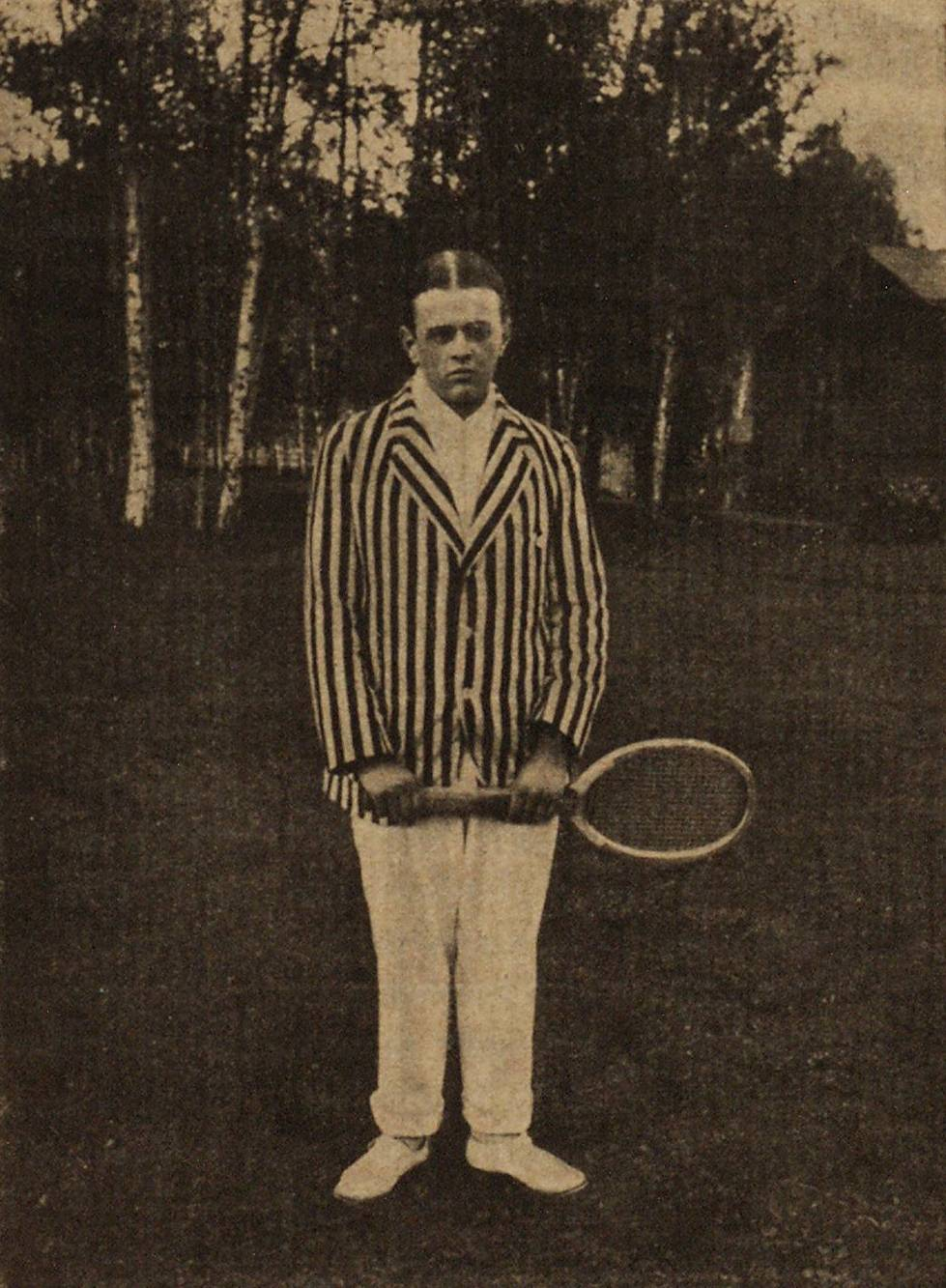
Arthur McPherson Jr. (left) and Robert A. McPherson(right), Russian Empire, c. 1914
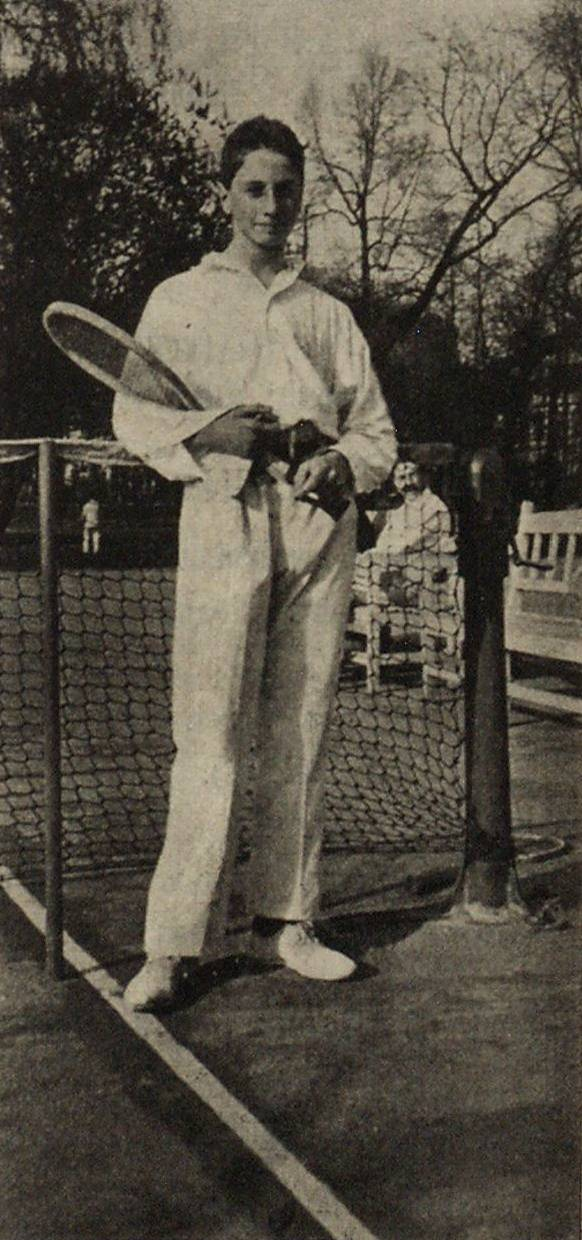
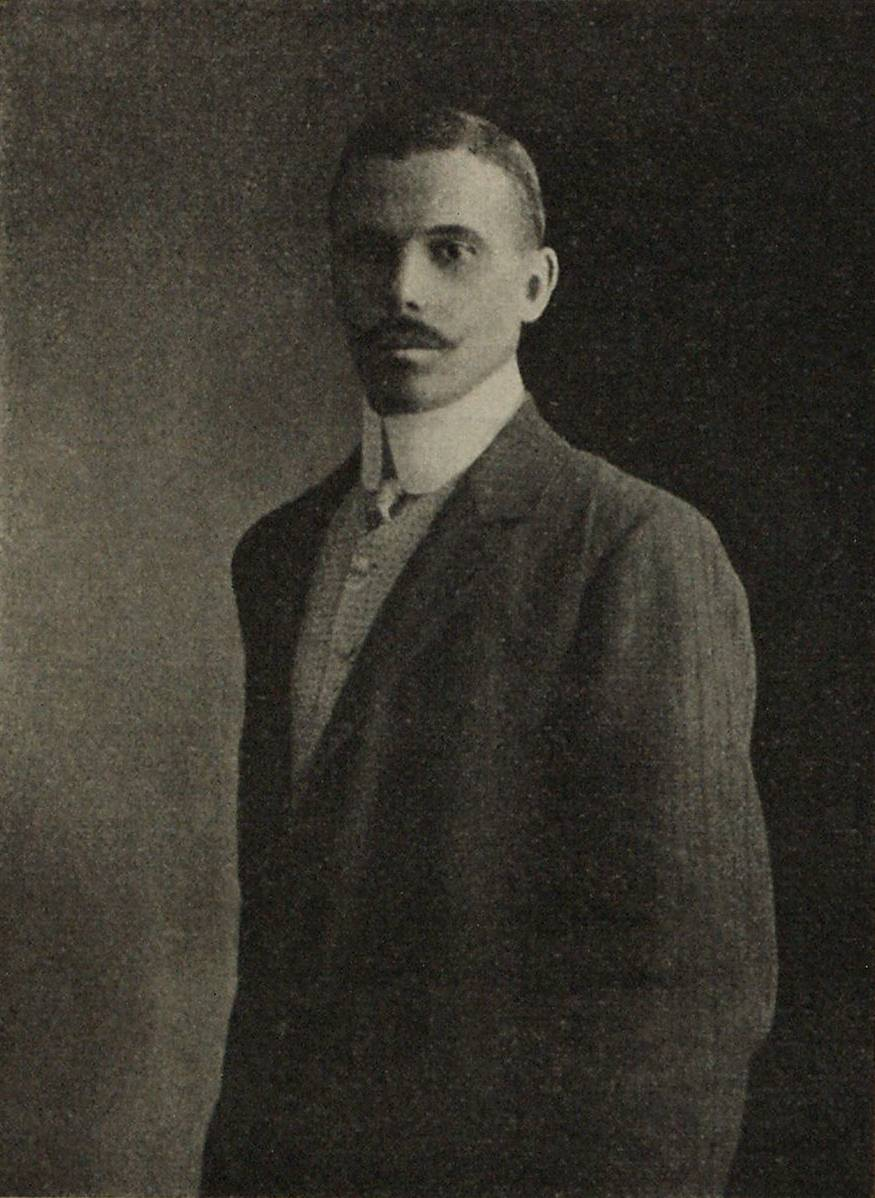
His Illustrious Highness Count Mikhail Sumarokov-Elston (left) and His [approaching Serene] Highness Prince Lev Urusov (right), Russian Empire, c. 1908-1911

After his father's death in January 1920, Arthur McPherson Jr. (1896–1976) reached the quarter finals of the 1920 Wimbledon Championships, becoming the first Russia-affiliated player to compete in a Grand Slam tournament. While some Russian tennis players such as Lev Urusov (1877–1933) and Mikhail Sumarokov-Elston (1893–1970) were still active far away from Russia, many other domestically based athletes did not feel welcome within the international sports community due to Russia's political landscape at the time, particularly during the Russian Revolution.

Russian Imperial Championships (1907–1914)
Year	Men's singles	Women's singles	Men's doubles	Women's doubles	Mixed doubles
1907	George Walter Bray	—	—	—	—
1908	Lev Urusov	—	George Walter Bray; Walter George Bray	—	—
1909	George Walter Bray	Ekaterina Polonskaya	George Walter Bray; Walter George Bray	—	—
1910	Mikhail Sumarokov-Elston	Nadezhda Martynova-Danilevskaya	George Walter Bray; Walter George Bray	—	—
1911	Mikhail Sumarokov-Elston	Nadezhda Martynova-Danilevskaya	George Walter Bray; Walter George Bray	—	—
1912	Mikhail Sumarokov-Elston	Nadezhda Martynova-Danilevskaya	Mikhail Sumarokov-Elston; Aleksandr Alenitsyn	—	Ekaterina Polonskaya; Mikhail Sumarokov-Elston
1913	Mikhail Sumarokov-Elston	Liudmila Iznar	—	—	Liudmila Iznar; Mikhail Sumarokov-Elston
1914	Mikhail Sumarokov-Elston	Elizabeth Ryan	Arthur A. McPherson; Robert A. McPherson	—	—

Tennis doubles being played in northern Sakhalin c. 1924

=== In the USSR ===
During the Soviet era, tennis was not popular due to its lack of appearance in the Olympic Games, cost, and strong association with the Holstein-Gottorp-Romanov dynasty. (Note: Under [the rule of] Alexander II the dominance of the Baltic Germans remained. Mikhail Katkov's employee, Krisjanis Valdemars, in his article "Who Rules Russia: The Russians or the Germans?", collected statistics: "15% of ministers are Germans; 25% members of the State Council; 40% senators; 50% generals; and 60% governors. And since governors run Russia, that is how he answered the question. Since Empresses were German, it was natural that Germans infiltrated into higher administration under their protection. Katkov read the article in amazement and did not believe the numbers. He told his secretary to check them. The results were even more surprising: there were 63% German senators, not 40%! But Katkov published Valdemars' article replacing 'Empresses' with 'high officials'.) From 1974 to 1984, Soviet tennis players had been forced by the Tennis Federation of the USSR to boycott all international competitions, except for the Davis Cup, in an unsuccessful attempt by the government to influence apartheid in South Africa. In addition, local men's tennis players were bullied by other Soviet athletes for competing in what they deemed a "feminine" sport.

In 1976, The New York Times reported that while tennis was still popular in the USSR, there was a scarcity of equipment, and no tennis clubs.

==== Notable USSR players ====
Player	Titles	Last competition representing the USSR
Alex Metreveli	9 ATP Tour-level singles titles by surface	South Orange Open, August 1974
Olga Morozova	8 WTA Tour-level singles titles by surface	Kent Championships, June 1976
Andrei Chesnokov	7 ATP Tour-level singles titles by surface	Canadian Open, July 1991
Leila Meskhi	5 WTA Tour-level singles titles by surface	WTA Wellington, February 1991
Natasha Zvereva	4 WTA Tour-level singles titles by surface	Sydney International, January 1990
Natalia Medvedeva	4 WTA Tour-level singles titles by surface	WTA Nashville, November 1990
Larisa Savchenko	2 WTA Tour-level singles titles by surface	St. Petersburg Open, September 1991
Dimitri Poliakov	1 ATP Tour-level single titles by surface	Yugoslav Open, August 1991

=== Post USSR ===
Since the end of the Soviet era, tennis has become more prominent in Russia. The Russian Federation has won the Fed Cup four times, in 2004, 2005, 2007 and 2008.

At the Beijing 2008 Olympic Tennis Event, Russia swept the women's tennis podium with Elena Dementieva, Dinara Safina, and Vera Zvonareva winning the gold, silver, and bronze medals, respectively.

Russia also boasts three former number 1 men's players–Safina's older brother Marat Safin, Yevgeny Kafelnikov and Daniil Medvedev. Russian men currently in the top 10 include Daniil Medvedev and Andrey Rublev, the former of whom was a finalist at the 2019 US Open, 2021 Australian Open, 2022 Australian Open. He won the 2021 US Open. Medvedev had briefly reached the number 1 ranking in February 2022, before being overtaken by Novak Djokovic. He reclaimed his first spot again in June 2022. Medvedev was the first player to reach number 1 without being a member of the 'Big Four'; Novak Djokovic, Roger Federer, Andy Murray, and Rafael Nadal, since February 2004.

==== Championship winners ====
Grand Slam champions and Olympic champions, and No.1 ATP / WTA tennis players (main events)
	Grand Slam Events				Other Accolades				
	Australian Open (hard court)	French Open (clay court)	Wimbledon (grass court)	US Open (hard court)	Olympic Tennis Event (Medalists)		No. 1s	Year-End Finals (hard court)	Year-End No. 1s
Men's singles	Y. Kafelnikov^{1999} M. Safin^{2005}	Yevgeny Kafelnikov^{1996}	–	Marat Safin^{2000} D. Medvedev^{2021}	Andrei Cherkasov^{1992 Barcelona (clay court)}	bronze	Y. Kafelnikov^{1999} M. Safin^{2000} D. Medvedev^{2022}	Nikolay Davydenko^{2009} Daniil Medvedev^{2020}	–
Men's singles	Y. Kafelnikov^{1999} M. Safin^{2005}	Yevgeny Kafelnikov^{1996}	–	Marat Safin^{2000} D. Medvedev^{2021}	Y. Kafelnikov^{2000 Sydney (hard court)}	gold	Y. Kafelnikov^{1999} M. Safin^{2000} D. Medvedev^{2022}	Nikolay Davydenko^{2009} Daniil Medvedev^{2020}	–
Men's singles	Y. Kafelnikov^{1999} M. Safin^{2005}	Yevgeny Kafelnikov^{1996}	–	Marat Safin^{2000} D. Medvedev^{2021}	Karen Khachanov^{2020 Tokyo (hard court)}	silver	Y. Kafelnikov^{1999} M. Safin^{2000} D. Medvedev^{2022}	Nikolay Davydenko^{2009} Daniil Medvedev^{2020}	–
Women's singles	M. Sharapova^{2008}	Anastasia Myskina^{2004} S. Kuznetsova^{2009} M. Sharapova^{2012&2014}	Maria Sharapova^{2004}	Svetlana Kuznetsova^{2004} M. Sharapova^{2006}	Elena Dementieva^{2000 Sydney (hard court)}	silver	M. Sharapova^{2005} D. Safina^{2009}	M. Sharapova^{2004}	–
Women's singles	M. Sharapova^{2008}	Anastasia Myskina^{2004} S. Kuznetsova^{2009} M. Sharapova^{2012&2014}	Maria Sharapova^{2004}	Svetlana Kuznetsova^{2004} M. Sharapova^{2006}	Vera Zvonareva^{2008 Beijing (hard court)}	bronze	M. Sharapova^{2005} D. Safina^{2009}	M. Sharapova^{2004}	–
Women's singles	M. Sharapova^{2008}	Anastasia Myskina^{2004} S. Kuznetsova^{2009} M. Sharapova^{2012&2014}	Maria Sharapova^{2004}	Svetlana Kuznetsova^{2004} M. Sharapova^{2006}	E. Dementieva^{2008 Beijing (hard court)}	gold	M. Sharapova^{2005} D. Safina^{2009}	M. Sharapova^{2004}	–
Women's singles	M. Sharapova^{2008}	Anastasia Myskina^{2004} S. Kuznetsova^{2009} M. Sharapova^{2012&2014}	Maria Sharapova^{2004}	Svetlana Kuznetsova^{2004} M. Sharapova^{2006}	Dinara Safina^{2008 Beijing (hard court)}	silver	M. Sharapova^{2005} D. Safina^{2009}	M. Sharapova^{2004}	–
Women's singles	M. Sharapova^{2008}	Anastasia Myskina^{2004} S. Kuznetsova^{2009} M. Sharapova^{2012&2014}	Maria Sharapova^{2004}	Svetlana Kuznetsova^{2004} M. Sharapova^{2006}	M. Sharapova^{2012 London (grass court)}	silver	M. Sharapova^{2005} D. Safina^{2009}	M. Sharapova^{2004}	–

==== Performance of Individual Neutral Athletes ====
Due to geopolitical restrictions, neutral status achievements are recorded separately.

===== Mirra Andreeva =====
Mirra Andreeva achieved a major milestone by winning the single title at the 2026 French Open and a silver medal in women's doubles at the 2024 Summer Olympics with Diana Shnaider as an Individual Neutral Athlete (AIN).

Player	Grand Slam Singles Performance	Olympic Tennis Event	Highest Ranking
Mirra Andreeva	2026 French Open W	2024 Paris silver (doubles)	No. 5 (singles)

== Milestones ==
=== 19th century ===
- 1875 (June 13 – May 31, old style; often mistakenly listed as June 12 (Russia Day), thus May 30 (old style), or vice versa): The first mention of tennis in Russian history is dated back to this day. It is documented in the diary of the Governor of Moscow, Grand Duke Sergei Alexandrovich of Russia.
- 1888: The first tennis club in Russia, the Lakhtinsky Lawn Tennis Club, is founded in the village of Lakhta near St. Petersburg (capital of the Russian Empire).
- 1898: There are eight active lawn tennis clubs in Russia at this time. All of them are located in and around St. Petersburg, in places like Kolomiagi, Ozerki, Pavlovsk, Pargolovo, Terijoki and Sestroretsk.
- 1900: The first tennis club in Moscow is founded (Russian Empire): the Moscow Society of Lawn Tennis Amateurs in Petrovka.

=== 20th century ===
- 1903: The first international tennis tournament is held in Russia – The St. Petersburg Open. In the same year, for the first time, Russian tennis players, including George Bray (Russian: Георгий Брей, romanized: Guéorguiï Breï, of British origin) and Ambrosios Petrococino (Russian: Амвросий Петрококино, romanized: Amvrossi Petrokokino, of Greek origin), take part in competitions abroad, in Stockholm.
- 1907: The first All-Russian lawn tennis competitions, the prototype of the Russian Tennis Championship, are contested.
- 1908: Establishment of the All-Russian Union of Lawn Tennis Clubs, which essentially the first Russian federation of tennis. There were a total of 48 member clubs in the union.
- 1909: The All-Russian Union of Lawn Tennis Clubs joins the England's Lawn Tennis Association (LTA), which allows Russian tennis players to participate in official international competitions. The international lawn tennis organization doesn't exist at that time.
- 1912: Russian tennis players Mikhail Sumarokov-Elston and Aleksandr Alenitsyn compete in the V Olympiad in London, England, British Empire.
- 1913: The All-Russian Union of Lawn Tennis Clubs, together with the tennis unions of 11 countries, founded the International Lawn Tennis Union (now called the International Tennis Federation, or ITF). It is considered the first Russian organization to participate in the creation of an international sports federation.
- 1914: The last All-Russian lawn tennis competitions, which were the prototype for the Russian Tennis Championship, are contested. A total of eight men's singles events (from 1907 to 1914) and five women's singles events were held (from 1909 to 1933). Men's singles champions include: George Bray (1907, 1909), [Kniaz] Lev Urusov (1908), and [Graf] Mikhail Sumarokov-Elston (1910–1915). Women's singles champions include: Ekaterina Polonskaya (1909), Nadezhda Martynova-Danilevskaya (1910–1912), Liudmila Iznar (1913), and Elizabeth Ryan (1914).
- 1920: Arthur McPherson Jr. is celebrated as the first Russian tennis player to compete at the Wimbledon Championships.
- 1926: The first Russian lawn tennis club in exile is created in Paris, France.
- 1929:
  - The Russian Lawn Tennis Federation is created in Paris, France to unite Russian tennis players in exile.
  - The All-Union Tennis Section, essentially the USSR Tennis Federation, is created in Moscow (capital of the Soviet Union).
- 1931: The Russian Lawn Tennis Federation (in Paris, France) becomes a member of the International Lawn Tennis Federation (ILTF).
- 1936-1937: The French tennis player, Henri Cochet (1901–1987), visits the USSR to open his tennis school in Moscow, where his students include famous Soviet players like Evgeni Korbut (1917–1991), Nikolai Ozerov (1922–1997), and Semyon P. Belits-Geiman (1921–2000).
- 1940: The membership of the Russian Lawn Tennis Federation (in Paris, France) in the International Lawn Tennis Federation (ILTF) is stopped.
- 1956: The Russian SFSR, as part of the USSR, renews its membership in the International Lawn Tennis Federation.
- 1958: Anna Dmitrieva and Andrei Potanin are the first Soviet players to participate in the Junior Wimbledon Championships.
- 1959: The USSR Tennis Federation is officially founded (in Moscow, Russian SFSR, Soviet Union).
- 1962: The USSR team makes its debut in the Davis Cup.
- 1968: The USSR team makes its debut in the Federation Cup.
- 1974: Chris Evert and Olga Morozova win the French Open – Women's doubles title by defeating Gail Chanfreau and Katja Ebbinghaus in the final. With this, Olga Morozova becomes the first Soviet/Russian tennis player to win a Grand Slam tournament (not in juniors).
- 1976: The USSR team, captained by Shamil Tarpishchev, refuses to play against the Chile team in the Davis Cup semifinals and is suspended by the International Tennis Federation (ITF) from participating in international competitions for two years.
- 1977: The Russian SFSR, as part of the USSR, becomes a member of the European Tennis Association (Tennis Europe).
- 1996: Yevgeny Kafelnikov becomes the first Russian tennis player to win a Grand Slam in singles when he won the French Open in both singles and doubles.
- 1999: Kafelnikov becomes the first Russian tennis player to achieve a No.1 (ATP rankings) in singles.
- 2000: Kafelnikov becomes the first Russian tennis player to win an Olympic gold medal in tennis, in singles.

=== 21st century ===
- 2002: The Russian Tennis Federation (in Moscow, capital of the Russian Federation) is founded, officially re-invented, and renamed (from the All-Russian Tennis Association, which was previously known as the Tennis Federation of the RSFSR, and merged with the remaining Tennis Federation of the USSR).
- 2008: The General Assembly of the International Tennis Federation (ITF) is held in Moscow, Russian Federation, commemorating the centenary of the Russian Tennis Federation.
- 2016:
  - Maria Sharapova, the five-time tennis Grand Slam singles champion, is banned from competing for two-years (reduced to 15 months de facto) after failing drugs test at the Australian Open in January.
  - Marat Safin becomes the first Russian player to be inducted into the International Tennis Hall of Fame.
- 2021: There are only a small number of tennis courts in the Russian Federation (only 7,200), including 2,600 indoor courts. In Moscow, there are 783 tennis courts, of which 261 are indoor courts.
- 2022:
  - The membership of the Russian Tennis Federation (in Moscow, Russia) in the International Tennis Federation is suspended.
  - The Lawn Tennis Association of the United Kingdom issued a ban on Daniil Medvedev and other Russian tennis players participating in the Wimbledon Championships.

== Medals ==
=== Olympic Games ===
Rank	Nation	Gold	Silver	Bronze	Total
1	Russia	3	3	2	8
2	ROC (ROC)	1	2	0	3
–	Individual Neutral Athletes	0	1	0	1
3	Unified Team	0	0	2	2
4	Russian Empire	0	0	0	0
4	Soviet Union	0	0	0	0
Totals (5 entries)		4	6	4	14

=== World University Games ===
Rank	Nation	Gold	Silver	Bronze	Total
1	Soviet Union	18	16	12	46
2	Russia	12	9	14	35
Totals (2 entries)		30	25	26	81

== See also ==
- Tennis at the Summer Youth Olympics
- Match fixing in tennis
- Category:Doping cases in tennis
- Russian-born American tennis players
  - Dennis Novikov, b. 1993
  - Sofia Kenin, b. 1998
- ATP / WTA Tour-level former tournaments in Russia
  - Moscow Ladies Open, 1994–1995
  - Kremlin Cup, 1990–2021
  - St. Petersburg Open, 1995–2021
  - St. Petersburg Ladies' Trophy, 2003–2022
  - Moscow River Cup, 2018
