= Belarus Tennis Federation =

Tennis organization in Belarus

- Sport: Tennis
- Jurisdiction: National
- Abbreviation: BTF
- Founded: 1991
- President: Sergei Rutenko
- Replaced: Tennis Federation of the BSSR / Tennis Federation of the USSR
- (founded): 1959

Official website
- www.tennis.by

The Belarus Tennis Federation (BTF, Belarusian: Беларуская тэнісная федэрацыя, romanized: Belaruskaia tenisnaia federatsyia, Russian: Белорусская теннисная федерация, romanized: Belorusskaia tennisnaia federatsiia) is the national governing body for the sport of tennis in Belarus. Its primary responsibilities include the following:

- Supporting and developing talented players through training programs, tennis academies, and competitive events.
- Organizing both national and international tennis tournaments.
- Managing and enhancing tennis facilities throughout Belarus.
- Representing Belarus at international tennis organizations such as the International Tennis Federation (ITF), the Association of Tennis Professionals (ATP), and the Women's Tennis Association (WTA).
- Promoting the sport at all levels to encourage participation and interest.

The Belarus Tennis Federation (BTF) has produced some notable players, such as Aryna Sabalenka and Victoria Azarenka, who have achieved great success on the international stage. The BTF plays a crucial role in maintaining and strengthening Belarus's position in the world of tennis.

== Performance table ==
Legend
— year-end number 1 ranked player in singles
— WTA Awards (Women's) Player of the Year / Most Improved (MI) / Newcomer (N) / Comeback (C) / Diamond Aces (DA) / Peachy Kellmeyer Player Service (PK) / Karen Krantzcke Sportsmanship (KK) / Doubles (DBL) / Fans' Favourite (FF) / Fans' Favourite Doubles (FFD) award winner
— ITF World Champions Junior Player of the Year award winner
— Junior Grand Slam singles champion
— Junior Grand Slam singles runner-up
Universiade (FISU) medalists:

— gold
— silver
— bronze

All-time top Belarus-related tennis players by the number of ATP / WTA (male/female) tour-level singles titles (plus DBL — MX in parentheses, if applied, and career-high singles ranking); active players — in bold; former countries' players, former competitions, and former players by switching from the Belarus Federation or through being associated with the Soviet Belarus by means of country of birth (COB) — in italics (see also Ubi bene ibi patria and the Bar Kokhba revolt); as of 14 September 2026, last updated after the 2021 Winston-Salem Open (ATP), 2026 Miami (WTA)
#	Name & Lifespan	S	H	COB	TB	GS	YC	Ma. / 1000 est. 1990	OG	All Titles + CHL + ITF	D / B Cup	AC est. 2020 ↓ UC est. 2023	HC est. 1989 EXH	LC est. 2017 EXH	Int. THF est. 1954	ENDT	BH	No. est. 1973 (′76) / 1975 ('84)	MMS est. 1934
Grand Slam singles champions with multiple GS titles
1	**Aryna Sabalenka**^{(N)} (b. 1998), Place of birth now: Minsk; BLR	F	1.82	BLR ↓ (Belarus)	NA	4_{_{57%}} (6)	RU^{2}	11 (13)	2R	**24** (29) 25 (31) 28 (37)	—	NA	—	NA	—	Wilson (racquets); Nike (apparel & shoes)	2H	1^{107 w} (1)	—
2	**Victoria Azarenka**^{(C)}^{(DA)*2} (b. 1989), Place of birth now: Minsk; BLR	F	1.83	† (Soviet Union); URS ↓ (Belarus)	NA	2_{_{40%}} (2–4)	RU^{1}	10 (15)	B-2012 (—G)	**21** (31–34) 22 (35–38)	—	NA	—	NA	—	Head → Wilson (racquets); Nike (apparel & shoes)	2H	1^{51 w} (7)	NA; 2010 (BLR)
Champions without GS and/or YEC and/or ATP-Masters / WTA-1000 singles title
NA	Anna Smashnova (b. 1976), before switching to Israel, also represented the USSR in juniors: from the BSSR (now Belarus) Place of birth now: Minsk; BLR	F	1.57	† (Soviet Union); URS ↓ (Belarus)	NA	4R^{2}	RR^{1}	0	1R	12 19	—	RTD 2007	—	NA	—	Babolat (racquets); Lotto (apparel & shoes)	1H	15 (275)	NA
3	Natasha Zvereva^{(N)}^{(DBL)*4} (b. 1971), before Belarus, also represented the USSR, the CIS & the Unified Team Place of birth now: Minsk; BLR	F	1.74	† (Soviet Union); URS ↓ (Belarus)	NA	RU^{1} (18–20)	0 (3)	RU^{3} (23)	QF (B)	4 (84–86) 7 (90–92)	—	RTD 2002	—	NA	2010	Yonex (racquets); Nike → Lotto → Adidas → Yonex (apparel & shoes)	2H	5 (1)	NA; 1991 (URS)
4	Max Mirnyi (b. 1977), before Belarus, also represented the CIS in juniors for the ITF Place of birth now: Minsk; BLR	M	1.96	† (Soviet Union); URS ↓ (Belarus)	NA	QF^{1} (6–10)	0 (2)	RU^{1} (16)	QF (QF—G)	1 (53–58) 1 (60–65) 4 (66–71)	—	RTD 2018	—	—	—	Wilson (racquets); Nike (apparel & shoes)	1H	18 (1)	NA; 2001 (BLR)
5	**Ilya Ivashka** (b. 1994), brother-in-law to Karen Khachanov. Place of birth now: Minsk; BLR	M	1.93	BLR ↓ (Belarus)	NA	4R^{2}	0	3R^{2}	3R (1R)	**1** 5 (6) 8 (11)	—	—	—	NA	—	Head (racquets); Nike → Hydrogen (apparel & shoes)	2H	40 (340)	—
Other notable players
6	**Aliaksandra Sasnovich** (b. 1994) Place of birth now: Minsk; BLR	F	1.74	BLR ↓ (Belarus)	NA	4R^{2}	0	4R^{2}	—	**0** 0 11 (17)	—	—	—	NA	—	Head (racquets); Lotto → K-Swiss (apparel & shoes)	2H	29 (128)	—
7	Tatiana Ignatieva (b. 1974), before Belarus, represented the USSR and the CIS Place of birth now: Minsk; BLR	F	1.73	† (Soviet Union); URS ↓ (Belarus)	NA	2R^{1}	NA	NA	NA	**0** 1	—	RTD 1997	NA	NA	—	?	2H	91 (570)	—
8	Uladzimir Ignatik (b. 1990), Place of birth now: Minsk; BLR	M	1.83	† (Soviet Union); URS ↓ (Belarus)	NA	0	0	0	—	**0** 5 (9) 23 (33)	—	RTD 2019	—	NA	—	Babolat (racquets, apparel & shoes)	2H	129 (117)	—
NA	Sergey Leonyuk; DBL; MX (b. 1960), represented the USSR: from the BSSR (now Belarus) Place of birth now: Minsk; BLR	M	?	† (Soviet Union); URS ↓ (Belarus)	NA	0	NA	NA	NA	0 0 (1)	—	NA	NA	NA	—	?	?	327 (245)	—

== See also ==
- Maria Sharapova, another notable tennis player hailing from Belarus
- Russian Tennis Federation
- Kazakhstan Tennis Federation
