= Russian Tennis Federation =

Tennis organization in Russia

- Sport: Tennis (incl. Beach tennis)
- Jurisdiction: National
- Abbreviation: RTF
- Founded: 1989
- Headquarters: Luzhnetskaya Naberezhnaya, Moscow
- President: Shamil Tarpishchev
- Replaced: Tennis Federation of the RSFSR / Tennis Federation of the USSR
- (founded): 1959

Official website
- www.tennis-russia.ru

The Russian Tennis Federation (Russian: Федерация тенниса России, romanized: Federatsiia tennisa Rossii) is the national governing body for tennis in Russia. It was founded in 1989 as the All-Russia Tennis Association and reorganized under its current name in 2002. The federation serves as the successor to the Tennis Federation of the Russian Soviet Federative Socialist Republic (RSFSR) (1959–1989) and the Tennis Federation of the Soviet Union (1959–93), which was previously known as the All-Union Tennis Section (1929–1959).

== History ==
Arthur Davydovich McPherson (1870–1919), a native of Petersburg, was the founder and president of the first All-Russia Union of Lawn Tennis Clubs (est. 1908), the forerunner of today's Russian Tennis Federation. In 1903 he organized the first St. Petersburg tennis championship, and four years later he set up the first national tournament. By 1913 the Russian championship was on the international tour and the game was thriving.

=== 2022 suspension ===
In reaction to the 2022 Russian invasion of Ukraine, the International Tennis Federation suspended the Russian Tennis Federation. In addition, Tennis Europe suspended the federation's membership. Teams representing Russia were therefore ineligible to compete at all Tennis Europe events (including Winter & Summer Cups, European Beach Tennis, and Senior Club Championships). All Tennis Europe events in Russia were suspended, including the European Junior Tennis Championships (16 & Under) in Moscow, and delegates from Russia were not eligible to attend the 2022 Annual General Meeting of Tennis Europe.

== Chairpersons ==
Main climate-related parts – because the Extreme North allows indoor tennis courts only — of the Russian Empire (Imperial Russia) with population (125.6 mln according to the 1897 census)
1. European Russia (subdivision) (50 Governorates: 93.4 mln) (74.4%)
2. Congress Poland (10 Governorates: 9.4 mln) (7.40%)
3. Caucausus Krai (11 Governorates and Oblasts: 9.2 mln) (7.10%)
4. Middle Asia (9 Governorates: 7.7 mln) (6.10%)
5. Siberia (9 Governorates: 5.7 mln) (4.50%)
6. Other (Census-eligible citizens abroad and in the Grand Duchy of Finland: 40.661) (0.03%)
Main climate-related (the Extreme North allows indoor tennis courts only) parts of the Russian Federation (Russia) with population (144 mln in 2018)
1. European part of Russia (European Russia: 110 mln) (76.4%)
2. Asian part of Russia (North Asia: 34 mln), the Extreme North mostly (23.6%)

=== All-Russia Union of Lawn Tennis Clubs ===
- Arthur McPherson (Jun 1908—1917), first chairman, killed by the Bolsheviks in 1919 (official version – died from typhoid in one of Moscow prisons).

=== All-Union Tennis Section (1929—1959) ===
- Vasily Mantsev (1929—1938), executed during the Great Purge in 1939 (CEC official)
  - Georgy Bobrov (1929—1938), executed during the Great Purge in 1938 (Council of People's Commissars official)
- Viktor Bogolepov (1946—1950)
- Boris Lavrenyov (1951—1955),

=== Tennis Federation of the USSR ===
- Iliodor Kulev (Aug 1959—1961, 1965—1980)
- Dmitry Gosudarev (1961—1965)
- Boris Volynov (1980—1985)
- Igor Volk (1985—1991)
- Shamil Tarpishchev (1991—1992; often listed as combined with the CIS)

==== Tennis Federation of the RSFSR ====
- (subject to the Tennis Federation of the USSR; sometimes listed as combined with the USSR)
  - Georgy Malinin (1959—1968)
  - Sergey Ostrovoy (1969—1988),
  - Shamil Tarpishchev (1991—1992; often listed as combined with the USSR)

=== All-Russia Tennis Association ===
(successor to the Tennis Federation of the RSFSR since 1990, to the Tennis Federation of the USSR since 1993)

- Nikita Mikhalkov (1989—1995), chairman → 1st president
- Yaroslav Kalagursky (1995—1999), president; (1999—present), honorary president
- Shamil Tarpishchev (1999—2001), president

=== Russian Tennis Federation ===
(consists of 73 Regional federations)

- Shamil Tarpishchev (Jan 2002—), president

Vice-presidents
1. Bakulev, Vladimir
2. Bokarev, Andrey
3. Gordeev, Alexander
4. Kafelnikov, Yevgeny
5. Lazarev, Vladimir
6. Myskina, Anastasia
7. Panteleev, Evgeny
8. Selivanenko, Alexey
9. Vikharev, Dmitry
10. Yumasheva, Polina
11. (Secretary-General) Shatkhin, Yakov

73 Regional Federations
Item No.	RF's Subject (Russian Road Signs)	Name of the Sports Federation (right-click in Google Chrome-translate plus US-to-UK converter)	Full Name of Managers and Contact Persons (Transborder passport: 2016—now)	RF's District	ITHF-Inducted Player's Local Affiliation (Note: Kaliningradskaya oblast’ is the Tolkien family's – incl. J. R. R. Tolkien, famous for inventing the term 'Mordor', among other accomplishments – place of origin, as of the 16th century.)
1.	Altayskiy kray	Regional Public Organisation "Tennis Federation of the Altai Territory"	Kuznetsov Evgenii Viktorovich	SI	—
2.	Amurskaya oblast’	"Amur Regional Public Sports Organisation of Tennis and Badminton"	Diakonov Stanislav Vasilevich	FE	—
3.	Arkhangel’skaya oblast’	Regional Public Organisation "Tennis Federation of the Arkhangelsk Region"	Sviridov Igor Viacheslavovich Nekrasov Iurii Arkadevich	NW	—
4.	Astrakhanskaya oblast’	Regional Sports Public Organisation "Astrakhan Regional Tennis Federation"	Nosenko Dmitrii Viktorovich Nosenko Oleg Viktorovich	SO	—
5.	Belgorodskaya oblast’	Regional Public Organisation "Belgorod Tennis Federation"	Ugarov Andrei Alekseevich Krasnorutskaia Anna Grigorevna	CE	—
6.	Bryanskaya oblast’ Used to be recognized internatianally as a part of [Greater] Ukraine (1919).	Regional Sports Public Organisation "Tennis Federation of the Bryansk Region"	Gaidukov Vladimir Ilich Studentsov Vladimir Petrovich	CE	—
7.	Vladimirskaya oblast’ (another former – historical All-Russian – capital: Vladimir-on-Klyaz’ma)	Vladimir Regional Physical Culture and Sports Public Organisation "Tennis Federation of the Vladimir Region"	Vakhlin Viktor Gennadevich Sokol Antonina Vasilevna	CE	—
8.	Volgogradskaya oblast’	Public Organisation "Tennis Federation of the Volgograd Region"	Tsap Viktor Petrovich Kotov Valerii Viktorovich	SO	—
9.	Vologodskaya oblast’	Regional Sports Public Organisation "Tennis Federation of the Vologda Region"	Petukhov Viktor Valerevich Bogdanov Evgenii Aleksandrovich	NW	—
10.	Voronezhskaya oblast’ Used to be recognized internatianally as a part of [Greater] Ukraine (1919).	Voronezh Regional Public Organisation "Sports Tennis Federation"	Smirnov Boris Semenovich Sheremet Andrei Valentinovich	CE	—
11.	Ivanovskaya oblast’	Ivanovo Regional Sports Public Organisation "Tennis Federation"	Slepov Viktor Fedorovich Zobnin Andrei Valentinovich	CE	—
12.	Irkutskaya oblast’	Regional Physical Culture and Sports Public Organisation "Tennis Federation of the Irkutsk Region"	Zmanovskaia Alena Vladimirovna	SI	—
13.	Kaliningradskaya oblast’	Regional Physical Culture and Sports Public Organisation "Kaliningrad Regional Tennis Federation"	Sukhanov Artem Valerevich	NW	—
14.	Kaluzhskaya oblast’	Regional Physical Culture and Sports Public Organisation "Tennis Federation of the Kaluga Region"	Firsanova Ekaterina Anatolevna	CE	—
15.	Kamchatskiy kray	Regional Public Organisation "Kamchatka Tennis Federation"	Frolov Vadim Viacheslavovich	FE	—
16.	Karachaevo-Cherkesskaya; Respublika Used to be recognized internatianally as a part of [Greater] Ukraine (1919).	Regional Public Organisation "Sports Tennis Federation of the Karachay-Cherkess Republic"	Korkmazov Arsen Idrisovich	NC	—
17.	Kemerovskaya oblast’	Kemerovo Regional Public Organisation "Sports Federation of Tennis"	Kushnerov Iurii Petrovich Solomatina Ekaterina Evgenevna	SI	—
18.	Kirovskaya oblast’	Regional Public Organisation "Tennis Federation of the Kirov Region"	Avtamonov Sergei Pavlovich	VO	—
19.	Kostromskaya oblast’	Kostroma Regional Public Sports Organisation "Tennis Federation"	Abukhovich Anatolii Nikolaevich Glushchenko Aleksandr Ivanovich	CE	—
20.	Krasnodarskiy kray Used to be recognized internatianally as a part of [Greater] Ukraine (1919).	Krasnodar Territorial Public Organisation "Tennis Federation" (KKFT)	Gasparian Petros Ervandovich Liiv Elena Eduardovna	SO	Yevgeny Kafelnikov's place of birth and representation Maria Sharapova's place of representation
21.	Krasnoyarskiy kray	Regional Sports Public Organisation "Tennis Federation of the Krasnoyarsk Territory"	Gerasimov Aleksei Iurevich	SI	—
22.	Kurganskaya oblast’	Regional Physical Culture and Sports Public Organisation "Tennis Federation of the Kurgan Region"	Mezentsev Vitalii Nikolaevich	UR	—
23.	Kurskaya oblast’ Used to be recognized internatianally as a part of [Greater] Ukraine (1919).	Regional Public Organisation "Tennis Federation of the Kursk Region"	Kostanov Sergei Levonovich Malygin Sergei Vladimirovich	CE	—
24.	Leningradskaya oblast’ (another former – historical All-Russian – capital: Ladoga)	Public Organisation "Regional Sports Tennis Federation of the Leningrad Region"	Golubev Andrei Vladimirovich Rukavitsyn Mikhail Leonidovich Rakova Svetlana Vladimirovna	NW	—
25.	Lipetskaya oblast’	Regional Physical Culture and Sports Public Organisation "Lipetsk Regional Tennis Federation"	Dvurechenskii Aleksandr Borisovich	CE	—
26.	Federal city of Moskva (another former – historical All-Russian – capital turned current capital, since 1918)	Regional Sports Public Organisation "Tennis Federation of Moscow"	Panteleev Evgenii Alekseevich	CE	Marat Safin's place of birth and representation
27.	Moskovskaya oblast’	Regional Public Organisation "Tennis Federation of the Moscow Region"	Gorelov Vladimir Andreevich	CE	—
28.	Murmanskaya oblast’	Regional Sports Public Organisation "Tennis Federation of the Murmansk Region"	Zozulia Aleksei Iurevich	NW	—
29.	Nizhegorodskaya oblast’	Regional Sports Public Organisation "Tennis Federation of the Nizhny Novgorod Region"	Baryshnikov Dmitrii Sergeevich Rogatskii Aleksandr Lvovich	VO	Marat Safin parents' place of origin (Krasnooktyabrsky District)
30.	Novgorodskaya oblast’ (another former – historical All-Russian – capital: Novgorod)	Regional Public Organisation "Tennis Federation" of the Novgorod Region	Ivanov Iurii Sergeevich	NW	—
31.	Novosibirskaya oblast’	Novosibirsk Regional Sports Public Organisation "Tennis Federation of the Novosibirsk Region"	Kozlovskii Dmitrii Anatolevich	SI	—
32.	Omskaya oblast’	Regional Sports Public Organisation "Tennis Federation of the Omsk Region"	Rasin Mikhail Semenovich Zagorodnykh Ilia Vladimirovich	SI	—
33.	Orenburgskaya oblast’	Regional Public Organisation "Tennis Federation of the Orenburg Region"	Khusid Dmitrii Leonidovich Baldina Tatiana Ivanovna Mukhamadeev Shamil Gabdulakhatovich	VO	—
34.	Orlovskaya oblast’	Regional Public Organisation of the Oryol Region "Tennis Federation"	Danilochkin Andrei Evgenevich Kuriliuk Eduard Evgenevich	CE	—
35.	Penzenskaya oblast’	Regional Sports Public Organisation "Tennis Federation of the Penza Region"	Kochetkov Oleg Aleksandrovich	VO	—
36.	Permskiy kray	Public Organisation "Tennis Federation of the Perm Territory"	Polsenova Elena Aleksandrovna Borozdina Valeriia Vladimirovna	VO	—
37.	Primorskiy kray	Regional Public Organisation "Tennis Federation of the Primorsk Territory"	Tikhonovich Viktor Dmitrievich	FE	—
38.	Pskovskaya oblast’	Pskov Regional Sports Public Organisation "Pskov Regional Tennis Federation"	Kiselev Oleg Igorevich	NW	—
39.	Respublika Altay	Regional Public Organisation "Tennis Federation of the Altai Republic"	Tiutiukov Evgenii Vladimirovich Karpov Boris Vasilevich	SI	—
40.	Respublika Bashkortostan	Regional Public Organisation "Tennis Federation of the Republic of Bashkortostan"	Korotkikh Dmitrii Viacheslavovich	VO	—
41.	Respublika Buryatiya	Regional Public Organisation "Tennis Federation of the Republic of Buryatia"	Semenov Bato Tsyrendondokovich	FE	—
42.	Respublika Dagestan	Regional Sports Public Organisation "Tennis Federation of the Republic of Dagestan"	Abdulaev Magomed Suleimanovich Islamova Bariat Gamzatovna	NC	—
43.	Respublika Kareliya	Regional Public Organisation "Tennis Federation of the Republic of Karelia"	Orlenok Maksim Iurevich	NW	—
44.	Respublika Komi	Regional Public Organisation "Tennis Federation of the Republic of Komi"	Serditov Sergei Viacheslavovich Churakova Elena Aleksandrovna	NW	—
45.	Respublika Mari El	Regional Sports Public Organisation "Tennis Federation of the Republic of Mari El"	Zubarev Pavel Sergeevich	VO	—
46.	Respublika Mordoviya	Public Organisation "Tennis Federation of the Republic of Mordovia"	Kalinichenko Nikolai Nikolaevich	VO	—
47.	Respublika Severnaya Osetiya – Alaniya	Regional Physical Culture and Sports Public Organisation "Tennis Federation" of the Republic of North Ossetia – Alania"	Bekuzarova Diana Kazbekovna	NC	—
48.	Respublika Tatarstan	Regional Public Organisation "Tennis Federation of the Republic of Tatarstan"	Zaripov Marat Nilevich	VO	—
49.	Respublika Tyva	Social and sports Organisation "Tennis Federation" of the Republic of Tyva"	Suge-Maadyr Vadim Mongushevich	SI	—
50.	Rostovskaya oblast’ Used to be recognized internatianally as a part of [Greater] Ukraine (1919).	Regional Public Organisation "Tennis Federation of the Rostov Region"	Koloskov Anatolii Evgenevich	SO	—
51.	Ryazanskaya oblast’	Ryazan Regional Public Physical Culture and Sports Organisation "Tennis Federation"	Kniazev Anton Aleksandrovich	CE	—
52.	Samarskaya oblast’	Regional Sports Public Organisation "Tennis Federation of the Samara Region"	Zimin Andrei Vladimirovich Kosyrev Aleksandr Nikolaevich	VO	—
53.	Federal city of Sankt-Peterburg (another former – historical All-Russian – capital)	Saint Petersburg Regional Public Organisation "Sports Tennis Federation"	Prokofev Vladimir Nikolaevich Isaev Sergei Viktorovich	NW	—
54.	Saratovskaya oblast’	Saratov Regional Public Physical Culture and Sports Organisation "Tennis Federation of the Saratov Region"	Cherviakova Elena Sergeevna Bakal Sergei Egorovich	VO	—
55.	Sakhalinskaya oblast’	Sakhalin Regional Sports Public Organisation "Tennis Federation of Sakhalin and the Kuril Islands"	Kotvitskii Aleksandr Aleksandrovich	FE	—
56.	Sverdlovskaya oblast’	Regional Public Organisation "Sverdlovsk Regional Tennis Federation"	Klopov Anton Nikolaevich Tokarevskikh Daria Alekseevna	UR	—
57.	Northwestern Regions [center in the federal city of] Saint Petersburg	Interregional Physical Culture and Sports Public Organisation of Tennis "North-West"	Shamakhov Vladimir Aleksandrovich Dzhelepov Igor Borisovich	NW	—
58.	Smolenskaya oblast’	Regional Physical Culture and Sports Public Organisation "Tennis Federation of the Smolensk Region"	Shutov Vladimir Mikhailovich	CE	—
59.	Stavropol’skiy kray Used to be recognized internatianally as a part of [Greater] Ukraine (1919).	Regional Sports Public Organisation "Tennis Federation of the Stavropol Territory"	Beskorovainyi Aleksandr Grigorevich	NC	—
60.	Tambovskaya oblast’	Public Organisation "Tennis Federation of the Tambov Region"	Rodionov Ivan Viktorovich	CE	—
61.	Tverskaya oblast’	Regional Sports Public Organisation "Tennis Federation of the Tver Region"	Khrustalev Artem Valerevich	CE	—
62.	Tomskaya oblast’	Tomsk Regional Public Organisation "Tennis Federation of the Tomsk Region"	Katsman Feliks Iurevich	SI	—
63.	Tul’skaya oblast’	Public Organisation "Tennis Federation of the Tula Region"	Kuznetsov Vladimir Iurevich	CE	—
64.	Tyumenskaya oblast’	Regional Sports Public Organisation "Tennis Federation of the Tyumen Region"	Belichenko Viktor Alekseevich Galaktionov Viktor Vladimirovich Minkin Mikhail Nikolaevich	UR	—
65.	Udmurtskaya; Respublika	Regional Sports Public Organisation "Tennis Federation of the Udmurt Republic"	Ponomarev Andrei Iurevich	VO	—
66.	Khabarovskiy kray	Regional Sports Public Organisation "Tennis Federation of the Khabarovsk Territory"	Babii Oleg Viktorovich	FE	—
67.	Khanty-Mansiyskiy avtonomnyy okrug – Yugra	Regional Sports Public Organisation "Tennis Federation of the Khanty-Mansi Autonomous District – Yugra"	Lukoshkov Dmitrii Sergeevich Krylovich Natalia Viacheslavovna	UR	Maria Sharapova's place of birth
68.	Khanty-Mansiyskiy avtonomnyy okrug – Yugra (City of Surgut)	Sports Public Organisation "Tennis Federation of the City of Surgut"	Takhmatov Viacheslav Georgievich	UR	Maria Sharapova's place of birth
69.	Chelyabinskaya oblast’	Chelyabinsk Regional Sports Public Organisation "Tennis Federation of the Chelyabinsk Region"	Zelinger Maksim Mikhailovich Ukolova Natalia Ivanovna	UR	—
70.	Chechenskaya; Respublika	Regional Public Organisation "Tennis Federation of the Chechen Republic"	Khakimov Adam Salaudinovich Isaev Khamzat Vakhaevich	NC	—
71.	Chuvashskaya; Respublika	Regional Sports Public Organisation "Tennis Federation of the Chuvash Republic"	Nikitin Andrei Arkadevich	VO	—
72.	Yamalo-Nenetskiy avtonomnyy okrug (Administratively subordinated to Tyumen Oblast)	Regional Public Organisation "Tennis Federation of the Yamalo-Nenets Autonomous District"	Korepanova Marina Olegovna Korepanov Maksim Borisovich	UR	—
73.	Yaroslavskaya oblast’	Regional Sports Public Organisation "Yaroslavl Regional Tennis Federation"	Dybin Pavel Viktorovich Zapadalova Irina Andreevna	CE	—
— / i).	Respublika Krym (Annexed by Russia in 2014; recognized internationally as a part of Ukraine.)	Regional Sports Public Organisation "Tennis Federation of the Republic of Crimea"	Chernyshev Vladimir Konstantinovich Shcherbakov Mikhail Dmitrievich	SO	—
— / ii).	Federal city of Sevastopol’ (Annexed by Russia in 2014; recognized internationally as a part of Ukraine.)	Regional Public Organisation "Sevastopol Tennis Federation"	Korchak Ekaterina Valerevna	SO	—
— / a).	Donetskaya; Narodnaya Respublika (Annexed by Russia in 2022; recognized internationally as a part of Ukraine.)	Regional public organisation "Tennis Federation of the Donetsk People's Republic"	Eroputov Sergei Aleksandrovich	—	—
— / b).	Luganskaya; Narodnaya Respublika (Annexed by Russia in 2022; recognized internationally as a part of Ukraine.)	Regional public organisation "Tennis Federation of the Luhansk People's Republic"	Tybekin Iaroslav Aleksandrovich Bazilevskii Vladimir Ilich	—	—
— / c).	Zaporozhskaya oblast’ (Annexed by Russia in 2022; recognized internationally as a part of Ukraine.)	Regional public organisation "Tennis Federation of the Zaporizhzhia Region"	Bednov Aleksandr Anatolevich	—	—

== Juniors ==
=== 16-and-under teams ===
Junior Davis / Billie Jean King Cup winners
Tournament	Year	Host	Winner
Boys	1990	(Netherlands) Rotterdam	**Soviet Union**; Yevgeny Kafelnikov (later represented (Commonwealth of Independent States) CIS (1992), / Russia, since 1993); Andrei Medvedev (later represented (Commonwealth of Independent States) CIS (1992), Ukraine, since 1993); Dmitri Tomashevich (later represented (Commonwealth of Independent States) CIS (1992), Uzbekistan, since 1993)
Girls	1997	(Canada) Vancouver	**Russia**; Anastasia Myskina; Elena Dementieva
Girls	2009	(Mexico) San Luis Potosí	**Russia**; Ksenia Kirillova; Daria Gavrilova (since 2015, has been representing Australia); Polina Leykina*
Girls	2010	(Mexico) San Luis Potosí	**Russia**; Margarita Gasparyan; Daria Gavrilova (since 2015, has been representing Australia); Victoria Kan*
Girls	2013	(Mexico) San Luis Potosí	**Russia**; Veronika Kudermetova; Daria Kasatkina (since 2025, has been representing Australia); Aleksandra Pospelova*
Boys	2016	(Hungary) Budapest	**Russia**; Alen Avidzba; Timofey Skatov (since 2018, has been representing Kazakhstan); Alexey Zakharov
Boys	2021	(Turkey) Antalya	**Russia**; Yaroslav Demin; Maxim Zhukov; Danil Panarin*

Legend
* was part of the winning team but did not play in the final

=== Junior GS singles finalists by year ===
Local Boys' titles

Year	Australian Open	French Open	Wimbledon	US Open
1959	—	—	(Soviet Union) Toomas Leius (from the present-time Estonia)	started in 1973
1965	—	—	(Soviet Union) Vladimir Korotkov (from the present-time Russia)	started in 1973
1966	—	(Soviet Union) Vladimir Korotkov (from the present-time Russia)	(Soviet Union) Vladimir Korotkov (from the present-time Russia)	started in 1973
1991	—	(Soviet Union) Andrei Medvedev (from the present-time Ukraine)	—	—
2009	—	—	(Russia) Andrey Kuznetsov	—
2014	—	(Russia) Andrey Rublev	—	—
2015	(Russia) Roman Safiullin	—	—	—
Total by country	1xRussia	2xSoviet Union 1xRussia	3xSoviet Union 1xRussia	—

Local Boys' runners-up

Year	Australian Open	French Open	Wimbledon	US Open
**1962**	—	—	(Soviet Union) Alex Metreveli (from the present-time Georgia)	started in 1973
**1964**	—	—	(Soviet Union) Vladimir Korotkov (from the present-time Russia)	started in 1973
**1987**	—	—	—	(Soviet Union) Andrei Cherkasov (from the present-time Russia)
**1999**	(Russia) Mikhail Youzhny	—	—	—
**2023**	—	—	Yaroslav Demin	—

Local Girls' titles

Year	Australian Open	French Open	Wimbledon	US Open
1961	—	—	(Soviet Union) Galina Baksheeva (from the present-time Ukraine)	started in 1974
1962	—	—	(Soviet Union) Galina Baksheeva (from the present-time Ukraine)	started in 1974
1965	—	—	(Soviet Union) Olga Morozova (from the present-time Russia)	started in 1974
1971	—	(Soviet Union) Yelena Granaturova (from the present-time Russia)	(Soviet Union) Marina Kroschina (from the present-time Kazakhstan, later moved to the present-time Ukraine)	started in 1974
1975	—	—	(Soviet Union) Natasha Chmyreva (from the present-time Russia)	(Soviet Union) Natasha Chmyreva (from the present-time Russia)
1976	—	—	(Soviet Union) Natasha Chmyreva (from the present-time Russia)	—
1986	no competition	—	(Soviet Union) Natasha Zvereva (from the present-time Belarus)	—
1987	—	(Soviet Union) Natasha Zvereva (from the present-time Belarus)	(Soviet Union) Natasha Zvereva (from the present-time Belarus)	(Soviet Union) Natasha Zvereva (from the present-time Belarus)
1998	—	(Russia) Nadia Petrova	—	—
1999	—	—	—	(Russia) Lina Krasnoroutskaya
2002	—	—	(Russia) Vera Dushevina	(Russia) Maria Kirilenko
2006	(Russia) Anastasia Pavlyuchenkova	—	—	(Russia) Anastasia Pavlyuchenkova
2007	(Russia) Anastasia Pavlyuchenkova	—	—	—
2009	Ksenia Pervak (switched to represent Kazakhstan but then switched back to Russia)	—	—	—
2010	—	—	—	(Russia) Daria Gavrilova (switched to represent Australia)
2014	(Russia) Elizaveta Kulichkova	(Russia) Daria Kasatkina (switched to represent Australia)	—	—
2015	—	—	(Russia) Sofya Zhuk	—
2016	—	—	(Russia) Anastasia Potapova (switched to represent Austria)	—
2023	Alina Korneeva	Alina Korneeva	—	—
2026	—	Alisa Oktiabreva (switched to represent Czech Republic)	Anna Pushkareva	—
Total by country	4xRussia 1xNEUTRAL	2xSoviet Union 2xRussia 2xNEUTRAL	8xSoviet Union 3xRussia 1xNEUTRAL	2xSoviet Union 4xRussia

Local Girls' runners-up

Year	Australian Open	French Open	Wimbledon	US Open
1958	—	—	(Soviet Union) Anna Dmitrieva (from the present-time Russia)	started in 1974
1968	—	(Soviet Union) Eugenia Isopaitis (from the present-time Russia)	—	started in 1974
1970	—	—	(Soviet Union) Marina Kroschina (from the present-time Kazakhstan, later moved to the present-time Ukraine)	started in 1974
1986	no competition	—	(Soviet Union) Leila Meskhi (from the present-time Georgia)	—
1990	—	(Soviet Union) Tatiana Ignatieva (from the present-time Belarus)	—	—
1991	—	—	(Soviet Union) Elena Makarova (from the present-time Russia)	—
1999	—	—	(Russia) Lina Krasnoroutskaya	(Russia) Nadia Petrova
2001	—	(Russia) **Svetlana Kuznetsova**	(Russia) Dinara Safina	(Russia) **Svetlana Kuznetsova**
2002	(Russia) **Maria Sharapova**	—	(Russia) **Maria Sharapova**	—
2003	—	(Russia) Vera Dushevina	(Russia) Anna Chakvetadze	—
2009	—	(Russia) Daria Gavrilova (switched to represent Australia)	—	(Russia) Yana Buchina
2010	—	—	—	(Russia) Yulia Putintseva (switched to represent Kazakhstan)
2011	—	—	(Russia) Irina Khromacheva	—
2012	(Russia) Yulia Putintseva (switched to represent Kazakhstan)	—	—	—
2015	—	(Russia) Anna Kalinskaya	(Russia) Anna Blinkova (switched to represent France)	—
2020	—	(Russia) Alina Charaeva (switched to represent Armenia)	—	—
2021	—	(Russia) Erika Andreeva	—	—
2023	**Mirra Andreeva**	—	—	—
2026	Ekaterina Tupitsyna	—	—	Anna Pushkareva

Legend
Player won 3 Grand Slam singles tournaments in the same year
Player won 2 Grand Slam singles tournaments in the same year
**Bolded** name indicates player went on to win Senior Grand Slam singles title

=== Junior GS singles titles by country ===
17	Soviet Union

16	Russia

4	NEUTRAL

=== Junior GS singles runners-up by country ===
19	Russia

15	Soviet Union

4	NEUTRAL

=== Junior GS doubles champions by year ===
Event	Year	Australian Open	French Open	Wimbledon	US Open
Girls' Doubles	1984	(Soviet Union) **Larisa Savchenko** (from the present-time Ukraine; switched to represent Latvia)	—	—	—
Girls' Doubles	1986	no competition	(Soviet Union) Leila Meskhi (from the present-time Georgia) (Soviet Union) **Natasha Zvereva** (from the present-time Belarus)	—	—
Girls' Doubles	1987	—	(Soviet Union) Natalia Medvedeva (from the present-time Ukraine) (Soviet Union) **Natasha Zvereva** (from the present-time Belarus)	(Soviet Union) Natalia Medvedeva (from the present-time Ukraine) (Soviet Union) **Natasha Zvereva** (from the present-time Belarus)	—
Girls' Doubles	2001	—	—	—	(Russia) Galina Fokina (Russia) **Svetlana Kuznetsova**
Girls' Doubles	2003	—	—	(Russia) Alisa Kleybanova	cancelled due to inclement weather
Girls' Doubles	2005	—	—	—	(Russia) Alisa Kleybanova
Girls' Doubles	2006	(Russia) Anastasia Pavlyuchenkova	(Russia) Anastasia Pavlyuchenkova	(Russia) Alisa Kleybanova (Russia) Anastasia Pavlyuchenkova	—
Girls' Doubles	2007	(Russia) Evgeniya Rodina (Russia) Arina Rodionova (switched to represent Australia)	—	(Russia) Anastasia Pavlyuchenkova	—
Girls' Doubles	2008	(Russia) Ksenia Lykina (Russia) Anastasia Pavlyuchenkova	—	—	—
Girls' Doubles	2009	—	—	—	(Russia) Valeriya Solovyeva
Girls' Doubles	2011	—	(Russia) Irina Khromacheva	—	(Russia) Irina Khromacheva
Girls' Doubles	2012	—	(Russia) Daria Gavrilova (switched to represent Australia) (Russia) Irina Khromacheva	—	—
Girls' Doubles	2014	(Russia) Elizaveta Kulichkova	—	—	—
Girls' Doubles	2015	—	—	—	(Russia) Aleksandra Pospelova
Girls' Doubles	2016	(Russia) Anna Kalinskaya	—	—	—
Girls' Doubles	2019	—	—	—	(Russia) Oksana Selekhmeteva (switched to represent Spain)
Girls' Doubles	2021	not held	(Russia) Oksana Selekhmeteva (switched to represent Spain)	(Russia) Diana Shnaider	—
Girls' Doubles	2022	(Russia) Diana Shnaider	—	Russian and Belarusian players suspended because of the politics	Diana Shnaider
Boys' Doubles	2023	—	Yaroslav Demin	—	—
Girls' Doubles	2023	—	—	—	Anastasiia Gureva
Total by country		1xSoviet Union 6xRussia	2xSoviet Union 4xRussia 1xNEUTRAL	1xSoviet Union 4xRussia	6xRussia 2xNEUTRAL

Legend
Player/Team won 3 Grand Slam doubles tournaments in the same year
Player/Team won 2 Grand Slam doubles tournaments in the same year
**Bolded** name indicates player went on to win Senior Grand Slam doubles title

=== Junior GS doubles titles by country ===
20	Russia

4	Soviet Union

3	NEUTRAL

=== Orange Bowl champions by year ===
Local singles champions

Year	Boys				Girls			
Year	18 & under	16 & under	14 & under	12 & under	18 & under	16 & under	14 & under	12 & under
1987	—	—	—	—	(Soviet Union) Natasha Zvereva (from the present-time Belarus)	—	—	—
1989	—	—	—	—	—	(Soviet Union) Svetlana Komleva (from the present-time Moldova)	—	—
1990	(Soviet Union) Andrei Medvedev (from the present-time Ukraine)	—	—	—	—	—	—	—
1991	—	—	—	—	(Soviet Union) Elena Likhovtseva (from the present-time Kazakhstan) (switched to represent Russia)	—	—	—
1994	—	—	(Russia) Artem Derepasko	Not held	—	—	—	Not held
1995	—	—	—	—	(Russia) Anna Kournikova	—	—	—
1996	—	—	—	—	—	(Russia) Elena Dementieva	—	—
1998	—	—	—	—	(Russia) Elena Dementieva	—	—	—
2000	—	—	(Russia) Artem Sitak (switched to represent New Zealand)	—	(Russia) Vera Zvonareva	—	—	—
2001	—	—	—	—	(Russia) Vera Zvonareva	—	—	—
2002	—	—	—	—	(Russia) Vera Dushevina	—	—	—
2004	—	—	—	—	—	—	—	(Russia) Valeria Solovyeva
2011	—	—	—	(Russia) Artem Dubrivnyy	—	—	—	—
2012	—	(Russia) Andrey Rublev	—	—	—	—	—	—
2013	—	—	—	—	(Russia) Varvara Flink	—	—	—
2014	—	—	—	—	—	—	(Russia) Anastasia Potapova (switched to represent Austria)	
2019	—	—	—	—	—	—	—	(Russia) Mirra Andreeva
2022	—	—	—	—	—	—	—	Kristina Liutova (almost switched to represent United States)
2023	Danil Panarin	—	—	—	—	—	—	—

Local doubles champions

Year	Boys, 18 and under	Girls, 18 and under
2003	—	(Russia) Ekaterina Kosminskaya
2006	(Russia) Danila Arsenov	—
2009	(Russia) Mikhail Biryukov (Russia) Alexander Rumyantsev	(Russia) Valeria Solovieva
2011	—	(Russia) Victoria Kan
2016	—	(Russia) Anastasia Potapova (switched to represent Austria)
2021	—	(Russia) Diana Shnaider
2024	Timofei Derepasko	—

== See also ==
- Kazakhstan Tennis Federation
- Belarus Tennis Federation
- Tennis in Russia
- Match fixing in tennis
- Category:Doping cases in tennis
