= Strings (tennis) =

Part of a tennis racket

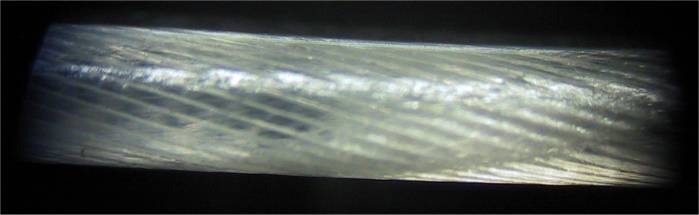
Tennis string in closeup view

In tennis, the strings are the part of a tennis racquet which make contact with the ball. The strings form a woven network inside the head (or "hoop") of the racquet. Strings have been made with a variety of materials and possess varying properties that have been measured, such as dynamic stiffness, tension retention, thickness (gauge), string texture (shape of the string), and rebound efficiency.

== Composition ==
The material used in tennis string can significantly affect a player's performance, and even health. Several materials are used to make tennis strings. They vary in terms of elasticity, durability, rebound efficiency, tension holding capability, and manufacturing cost, among other considerations.

=== Natural gut ===
Animal intestine is the most resilient material used to make tennis strings. It has better tension retention than any other material, and also is softer than any other material used for tennis strings. It provides the most energy return, meaning it is the most efficient string. It remains soft at high tensions while other materials tend to stiffen dramatically. This allows gut string to enable players to string rather tightly to improve ball control without losing much rebound efficiency (power) and without greatly increasing impact shock, which can hurt the elbow and other joints.

Its principal drawbacks are much higher cost to manufacture and purchase than other materials, weakness to shear stresses from off-center hits (typical of beginning players), variable quality control depending upon the brand, batch, age, storage conditions, and grade, difficulty of stringing due to its delicacy, and poor durability when wetted with water. Natural gut is very sensitive to different types of weather and those players who use it normally carry several different racquets with different tensions to compensate for this. Some players, particularly those who hit flat shots and hit the sweet spot consistently, find high-quality gut to be more durable than many other types of strings due to its outstanding tension retention. This may help to offset the high initial cost. The use of a dense string pattern also generally improves the longevity of natural gut.

Natural gut is produced by drying fibers extracted from a part of the cow intestine called the serous membrane, or serosa, which contains collagen designed to withstand the stretching and contraction of the intestine. It is this elasticity that makes the fibers useful for tennis string. Sheep intestines have also been used for racquet strings in the past. A general name for this material is catgut.

The first natural gut tennis string was rumored to be manufactured in 1875 by Pierre Babolat, who would launch the VS brand of gut fifty years later. Natural gut is usually offered in coated form, to reduce its tendency to unravel, particularly when humid or wet. Even though handles were used after gloves in “Jeu de Paume,” the first prototype of the modern racket used today was created in Italy in 1583. The first rackets were made of wood and had strings made of gut at this time. The rackets had a slightly different shape than are used today; however, they are the first semblance of a racket being used for tennis. The strings utilized in these rackets were similar to strings that had been used in instruments previously.

=== Synthetic gut ===
Synthetic gut is nylon, nearly always composed of a single filament. It is a very inexpensive string to manufacture and is generally the least expensive string to purchase.

Small changes from pure nylon are usually found in strings sold as "synthetic gut". Textured coatings, colorants and the addition of a small amount of Kevlar are the most common changes. Some manufacturers, such as Gosen, label nylon strings with words like "sheep", as in sheep intestine, although such strings contain no gut.

Synthetic gut, as it is used for mono-filament nylon strings, is now a misnomer, as the creation of multi-filament strings has provided players with a better approximation of natural gut's performance. Modern "synthetic gut" is actually a multi-filament string that holds its tension extremely well and which has a dynamic stiffness profile that is closest to natural gut, although the industry continues to apply the term to mono-filament nylon strings.

=== Multi-filament, or "multi" ===
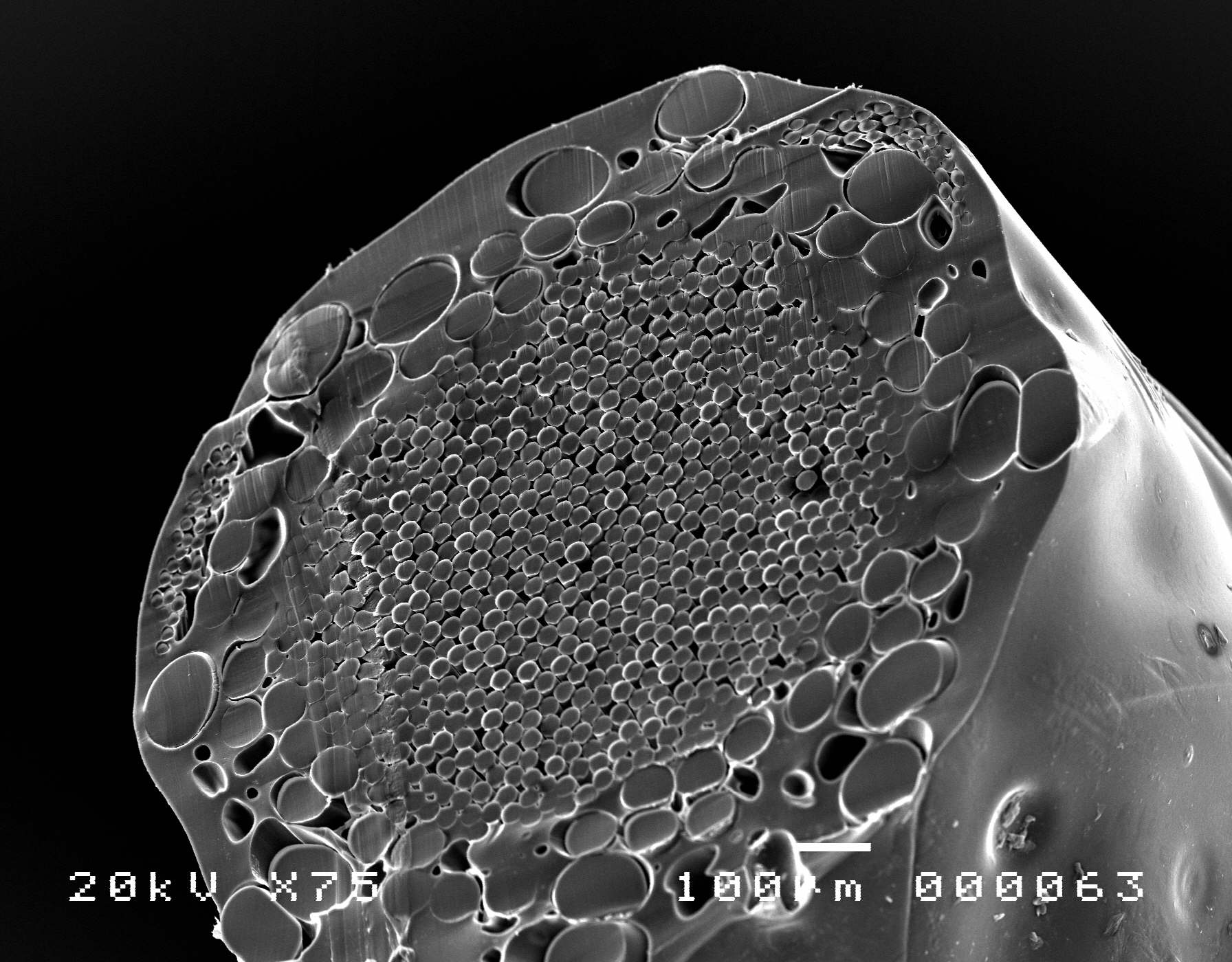
SEM micrograph of a sectioned Multi-filament string

Multi-filament strings, known commonly as "multis" are strings that have more than one filament. They are most commonly made of many filaments of nylon, but can incorporate other materials such as polyurethane, Zyex, Vectran, Kevlar, and other materials. Multi-filament strings offer better elasticity than single filament strings, but usually inferior durability. No multi-filament string holds its tension as well as natural gut, and none of them are as soft.

However, in comparison to mono-filament "synthetic gut", multi-filament strings can offer a much closer approximation of natural gut's performance. The softest multi-filament strings can be made with Zyex and polyolefin, although some of the softest of these strings are no longer on the market.

=== Nylon ===
Nylon is the most popular string material for amateur players due to its low cost and the improvement in elasticity offered by multi-filament strings. Wear-resistant coatings for nylon strings are common, especially with multi-filament strings, because the outer filaments tend to break first as the racquet is used.

=== Polyester ===
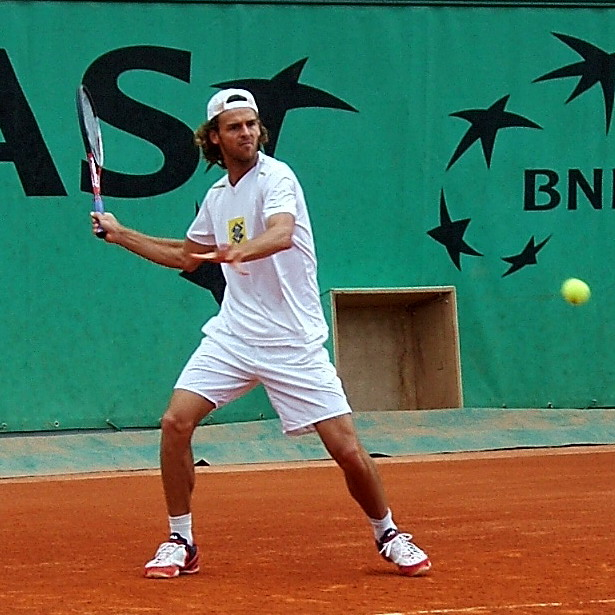
Gustavo Kuerten dawned the era of polyester string, which now dominates professional tennis

Polyester is a stiff and durable string material, originally intended for use by frequent string breakers. It took time for this string material to become popular, primarily due to its poor tension holding capability. However, players feel they are able to apply more topspin to balls while maintaining control with polyester strings.

Polyester revolutionized professional tennis when a then little known Belgian string maker Luxilon supplied Gustavo Kuerten in 1997, who went on to win that year's French Open. Since then, polyester's support for heavy topspin in particular has made it the most popular string material in the professional tennis tour. The increased topspin due to polyester strings has been verified with controlled experiments today. The exact cause for the increased spin is not known but there is strong evidence that the low friction between strings is a factor.

=== Kevlar ===
Kevlar is the stiffest, most durable synthetic string available, and is thus extremely hard to break. Although it is one of the best strings in terms of tension holding capability (next to natural gut), it is the most dangerous string when it comes to developing tennis elbow. Kevlar is often strung with another string, such as nylon), in order to combine both strings' qualities, as Kevlar by itself feels too stiff for many tennis players, especially when combined with a stiff racquet. Some advocate using a very thin gauge Kevlar for increasing comfort, but even in the thinnest gauge it is a stiff string. Another strategy to increase comfort and improve rebound efficiency is to string Kevlar at a low tension.

=== Vectran ===
Vectran is the second-most stiff and durable of string types. It is perhaps the least commonly used contemporary string material. It is usually added to nylon string to increase nylon's durability and stiffness, as with Kevlar. Yonex, for instance, offers two badminton strings, made primarily from nylon, which have Vectran strands. However, the Ashaway company offers a braided Vectran tennis string.

=== Zyex ===
Zyex string offers more rebound efficiency, i.e. gut-like dynamic stiffness, than other synthetic strings, particularly when strung at low tensions. This gives it playability that is more similar to natural gut than, arguably, other synthetic materials. It also has low overall stiffness. The ProKennex IQ Element Z string, for instance, has the lowest stiffness of any synthetic string yet tested. The drawback of Zyex is that the outer wrapping materials in Zyex tennis string tend to be much less durable than the Zyex filaments inside the string and do not bond with them. This can lead to the outer wrapping wearing away, leaving the inner Zyex filaments.

=== Polyolefin ===
Polyolefin is one of the softest synthetic string materials, rivaling some Zyex and most nylon multi-filaments. It offers mediocre durability and tension retention, so it is generally used as the cross string in a hybrid string setup. For those who do not break strings very quickly, however, 100% polyolefin stringing may be a good alternative to natural gut and multi-filament strings. This is especially true for those who have had tennis elbow and find natural gut string to be too costly.

=== Metal wire ===
Metal wire, usually piano wire, was used in some historical racquets.

=== Titanium ===
Titanium is also used. Usually Titanium strings are based on Nylon or multi-filament strings with the titanium applied with the coating of the string, to protect the material from UV and abrasion, or is integrated into the filaments to modify the play-ability of the string. Based on Nylon or multi-filament strings, the titanium is either applied with the coating of the string, protecting the material from UV radiation and abrasion, or the titanium is integrated into the filaments to modify the play-ability of the string. Titanium strings are no longer popular today.

== Gauge ==
The "gauge" number determines the thickness of the string. A string rated with a high gauge number is a thinner string, and vice versa. Thinner strings typically offer higher performance but break more frequently than thicker strings.

== Stringing pattern ==
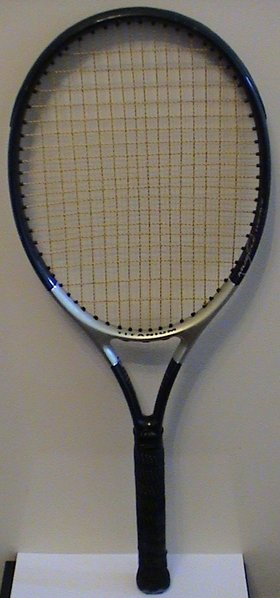
A strung tennis racquet

Virtually all modern racquets are strung in a criss-cross horizontal-vertical pattern. Various other patterns have been used in history with varying success.

Double strung tennis racquets were introduced in 1977 but the "spaghetti racquets" were later banned because they permitted excessive spin and were too successful.

Racquets are strung either with two separate strings (and thus four knots), or with a single string (resulting in only two knots). Sometimes, a hybrid of two different string types may be used in the same racquet. Traditionally, a double half hitch has been used to tie off tennis string, along with a starting knot. Recently, new kinds of knots have been used called the "pro-knot" and "Parnell knot". Along with the use of a starting clamp, this can make all the knots identical, and improve the aesthetics of a string job.

== Stringing ==
The process of installing strings in the racquet is called "stringing," and is done with a racquet string machine. These machines vary in complexity, accuracy and price.

== String tension ==
The "string tension" of a racquet, usually expressed in pounds, indicates the pressure under which the strings are secured to the frame. The string tension affects a racquet's playing characteristics, such as the "feel" of the ball, control over the ball, as well as maximizing power.

All racquets come with recommended string tensions, most of which lie between 50 and 70 pounds (220 to 310 N).

A loosely strung racquet will usually have a larger sweet spot and will hit farther but, when swung hard enough, it will shoot balls unpredictably; a tighter string job will help make delicate shots with more finesse and control.

An extremely tightly strung racquet cuts down on a tennis player's feel on the ball, but can give the player excellent control if swung hard enough, with a smooth stroke. Such tension may make delicate shots more difficult, but makes play from the baseline more constant. However, if a player often hits powerful shots, a tightly strung racquet may quickly tire the arm, possibly resulting in tennis elbow.

Many professional stringers advise players to string racquets with the lowest tension possible while still being able to maintain control of the ball. Beginning players trying to find their tension should start in the middle of the recommended tension range and adjust the tension from there to meet their needs. The recommended tension is usually printed on the racquet. With a lower tension the racquet will have more power and less control; with a higher tension, it will have less power and more control.

== Restringing ==
Due to the tension present on the strings, elasticity and tension begins to decrease the moment they are installed in a racquet. "Dead strings", or strings which have lost their tension, cut down on the performance of a racquet. Dead strings may also hamper a tennis player's ability to generate power and pace, and may even make their arm sore.

The frequency of restringing depends on the player and the racquet, but there are a few recommended intervals. One is to restring the racquet as many times in a year as the player uses it in a week; e.g., if the racquet is used three times per week, it should be restrung three times per year. Another guideline is to restring after every 40 hours of play; if the racquet is used three times per week and three hours per session, it should be restrung approximately every five weeks. If the player has access to a tennis string tension meter (or access to a pro shop equipped with one), he may restring his racquet after he measures a loss of 25% or more of stringbed stiffness. However, many players who hit the ball hard enough to break the strings simply restring rackets whenever the strings break.

== United States Racquet Stringers Association ==
The United States Racquet Stringers Association (USRSA) offers two levels of certification for stringers: the Certified Stringer and the Master Racquet Technician, of which around 350 exist worldwide. The Master Racquet Technician certification process includes testing of the stringer's ability to string a racquet, perform grip work, identify mistakes in an improperly strung racquet, and pass a written test that covers not only strings, but racquet technology as well.

Since 2004, RSi, the USRSA's monthly magazine, has named a Stringer of the Year. Past winners were:

- Randy Stephenson, Texas (2004)
- Bob Patterson, Alabama (2005)
- Grant Napier, Tennessee (2006)
- Tim Strawn, Virginia (2007)
- Nate Ferguson, Florida (2008)
- Ron Rochi, Illinois (2009)
- Tom Parry, Minnesota (2010)
- Todd Mobley, Georgia (2011)
- John Gugel, Florida (2012)
- Chuck Hakansson, Georgia (2013)
- David Yamane, North Carolina (2014)
- Julian Li, California (2015)
- Philip van Asselt, Pennsylvania (2016)
