= Shamil Tarpishchev =

Russian tennis coach and former player (born 1948)

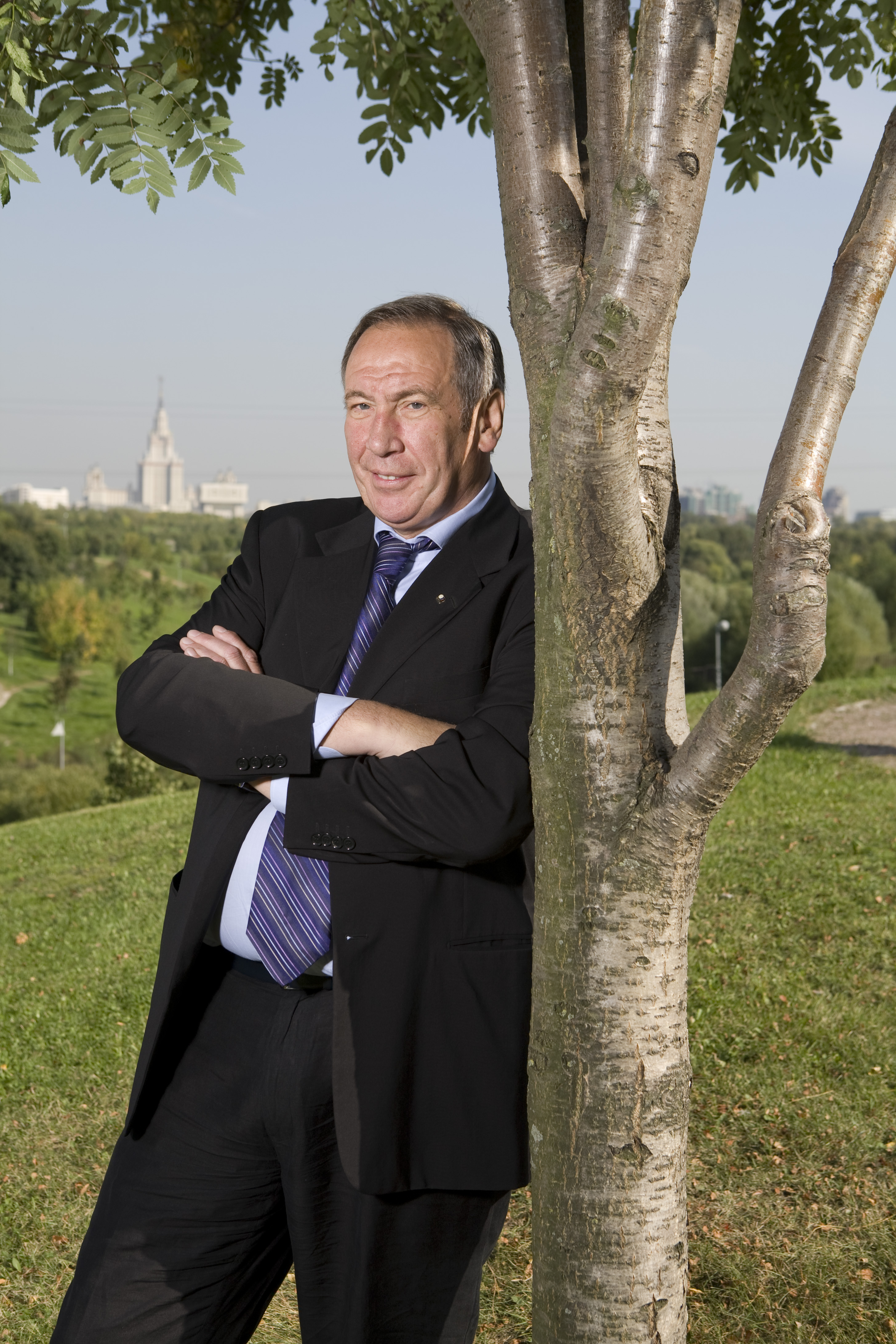
- Tarpishchev in 2009
- Full name: Shamil Anvyarovich Tarpishchev
- Country (sports): Soviet Union; Russia
- Born: 7 March 1948 (age 77) Moscow, Russian SFSR, Soviet Union

Singles
- Career record: 2–3
- Career titles: 0

Team competitions
- Davis Cup: W (2002, 2006, 2021) (as captain)
- Fed Cup: W (2004, 2005, 2007, 2008) (as captain)

Shamil Anvyarovich Tarpishchev or Tarpischev (Note: 'Shamil Tarpischev' transliteration can be a result of common BGN/PCGN transliteration with the simplification of too complicated 'щ' (shch, 4 letters in Latin script) to à la German 'ш' (sch). ISO 9 romanization is the following: Šamil’ Tarpiŝev.) (Russian: Шамиль Анвярович Тарпищев, IPA: [ʂɐˈmʲilʲ ɐnˈvʲarəvʲɪtɕ tɐrˈpʲiɕːɪf], Tatar: Шамил Әнвәр улы Тарпищев, romanized: Şamil Änvär ulı Tarpişev; born 7 March 1948) is a Russian tennis coach and former player, sports politician.

From the early 1990s, he was one of the closest figures to Russian president Boris Yeltsin. Since 1992, he has been the head of the National Sports Foundation. In 1994-1996, he was chairman of the State Committee for Sport of Russia. In 1994, he became a member of the International Olympic Committee (IOC).

== Education ==
Tarpishchev studied biology at the Lomonosov University in Moscow, but did not end up completing his studies, and dropped out after one year. He then moved on to graduate from the State Central Institute of Physical Culture (ice hockey department), where he completed his degree in 1970. He successfully participated in Russian and international tennis competitions. Master of Sports of the USSR (1966), he also has a Doctor of Philosophical Science.

== Sports career ==
External images
- Shamil Tarpischev playing tennis in his youth
- Shamil Tarpischev in 1981 holding the Europe Zone trophy of Davis Cup as captain, with Vadim Borisov, Sergey Leonyuk (in his right), and Alexander Zverev Sr., Konstantin Pugaev (in his left)

At the age of 17 he began his tennis career and won his first international tennis tournament in Sochi. In 1970, he continued his tennis career at the army sports club CSKA Moscow while also serving in the Soviet army. While there, he played with General Dimitry Lelyuschenko and Marshal Andrei Grechko. In 1973, he managed to reach the third round at the Italian Open (tennis), and in August in that year he was ranked 164th in the world.

Since 1974 he coaches tennis players. From 1974 to 1991 he has been the head coach of the USSR, CIS (1992) and Russian (since 1997) female and male tennis teams. In the Soviet times, Tarpishchev helped winning tennis players 26 gold medals at European Championships (1974-1983), as well as brought the Davis Cup team in 1974, 1976, and the Fed Cup team in 1978 and 1979 to the semifinals. He was also finalist of the King's Cup in 1981. He was advisor to the president of the Russian Federation for physical culture and sport (1992-1994), president of the National Sports Foundation (NSF) (1992 - July 1994), chairman of the Coordination Committee for Physical Culture and Sports under the president of Russia (1993-1997), and chairman of the Russian State Committee for Physical Culture and Tourism (1994-1996).

He was advisor to the mayor of Moscow for sport and chairman of the board of directors of the Kremlin Cup (1996). In 2002, he became a member of the Council under the President of Russia on Physical Culture and Sport, chairman of the Committee on Development of Priority Directions of the State Policy in the sphere of physical culture and sports, as well as the Strategy of Development of Sports in Russia.

Since 1994, Tarpishchev is member of the executive committee of the Russian Olympic Committee and the International Olympic Committee. Where he was a member of the Radio and Television Commission from 1995 to 1999, part of the Sport and Environment Commission from 2006 to 2015, part of the Entourage Commission from 2014 to 2015, as well as part of the Athletes' Entourage Commission since 2015.

Since 2004, the Tennis Academy of Kazan holds the name of Tarpishchev.

In 2014, WTA fined ($25,000), and forced Tarpischev to apologize for making racist and sexist comments regarding American Tennis Superstars Venus and Serena Williams. Tarpischev was also banned/suspended from WTA tour involvement for one year because of his offensive rhetoric directed towards Venus and Serena Williams. In Russia, his participation at the Evening Urgant show was understood as another lame joke by Ivan Urgant. Tarpishchev supported the joke in his unsuccessful attempt to be as funny as the host by turning it into an in-joke about the winning duo of Bryan brothers (Russian: братья Брайан, romanized: bratya Brayn) and the gender-neutral word (Russian: братия, romanized: bratia) meaning 'society, community' (analog to the English 'guys'):

Ivan Urgant to Tarpishchev and Elena Dementieva: It was an Olympiad where Masha Sharapova played one [f.], one [m.] of these (Russian: с одной, одним из этих)...
Shamil Tarpishchev (laughing): Williams brothers (Russian: братья Уильямс, romanized: bratya Uilyams).
Ivan Urgant: Williams brothers.

Tarpishchev blamed Stacey Allaster for initiating a scandal. After the team's victory over Sweden, Shamil made a record of 55 wins as team captain of the Russian Davis Cup team. The former record holder was Australian Neil Fraser.

At the 2021 Davis Cup Finals, Tarpishchev led the Russian Tennis Federation team to victory, securing Russia's first Davis Cup championship in fifteen years. RTF team members included Daniil Medvedev, Andrey Rublev, Aslan Karatsev, Karen Khachanov, and Evgeny Donskoy. Following the victory, Tarpishchev criticized the Russian Ministry of Sports decision to exclude all the main men's and women's team titles (Davis Cup and Billie Jean King Cup) from the ministry's list of world championships in tennis, thus to make the title-winning athletes ineligible for the locally prestigious (since 1934) award "Merited Master of Sports" (MMS). Simultaneously, he announced his plans to resign from the men's coaching position to concentrate on management as the federation's president only.

== Publications ==
Tarpishchev has authored, as well as co-authored, various books about tennis history and tennis tactics.

== Criticism ==
As of 2021, Tarpishchev has been mostly criticised for the slow development of tennis infrastructure inside Russia and, since the 2008 financial crisis, for his inability to prevent a 14-year-long trend of local tennis players' switching to the Kazakhstan Tennis Federation. With Marat Safin and Mikhail Youzhny as his main opponents, Tarpishchev explained one of the main issues to the YouTube channel "Myach Point" in 2020 as the following: "It has to be lobbied. At one time, when [Valentina] Matviyenko served as the Governor of St. Petersburg, I had managed to sign [the plan of] 12 city areas for the future tennis courts. [Vladimir] Putin crossed out everything. Apartment buildings have been built [instead of tennis courts]. Because there's no person who constantly sits there and lobbies. We don't have such resources."

== Awards and honours ==
- Sports title "Merited Coach of the RSFSR" (1981).
- Sports title "Merited Coach of the USSR" (1985).

He received the Order of International Tennis Federation (ITF) for Merits in Tennis in 1988, and the Order of Honour (Russia) in 1994. In 2003, Tarpishchev was the Mordovia State Prize winner, and in 2008 he received the Order "For Merit to the Fatherland", II degree (2004) and IV degree (2008). Additionally, Tarpishchev has received the Medal "In Commemoration of the 1000th Anniversary of Kazan", the honour Badge for Merit in the Development of Physical Culture and Sports, the honour badge for Merits in Developing Olympic Movement, and the honorary badge "Excellent worker in physical culture and sports". He has also received the Order of Friendship, the Order of Honour (Russia), Honorary Citizen of the Republic of Mordovia and Tatarstan. In 2007, he received a Certificate of Recognition and Appreciation from the president of Russia for his continuing efforts to ensure the selection of and awarding to the city of Sochi the XXII Olympic Winter Games. In 2003, he was also elected Best Coach of SLAVA nominations of sport, and was winner of the Davis Cup Championship in 2002.
