= Luzhnetskaya Embankment =

Street in Moscow, Russia

Coordinates: 55.7114°N 37.5564°E

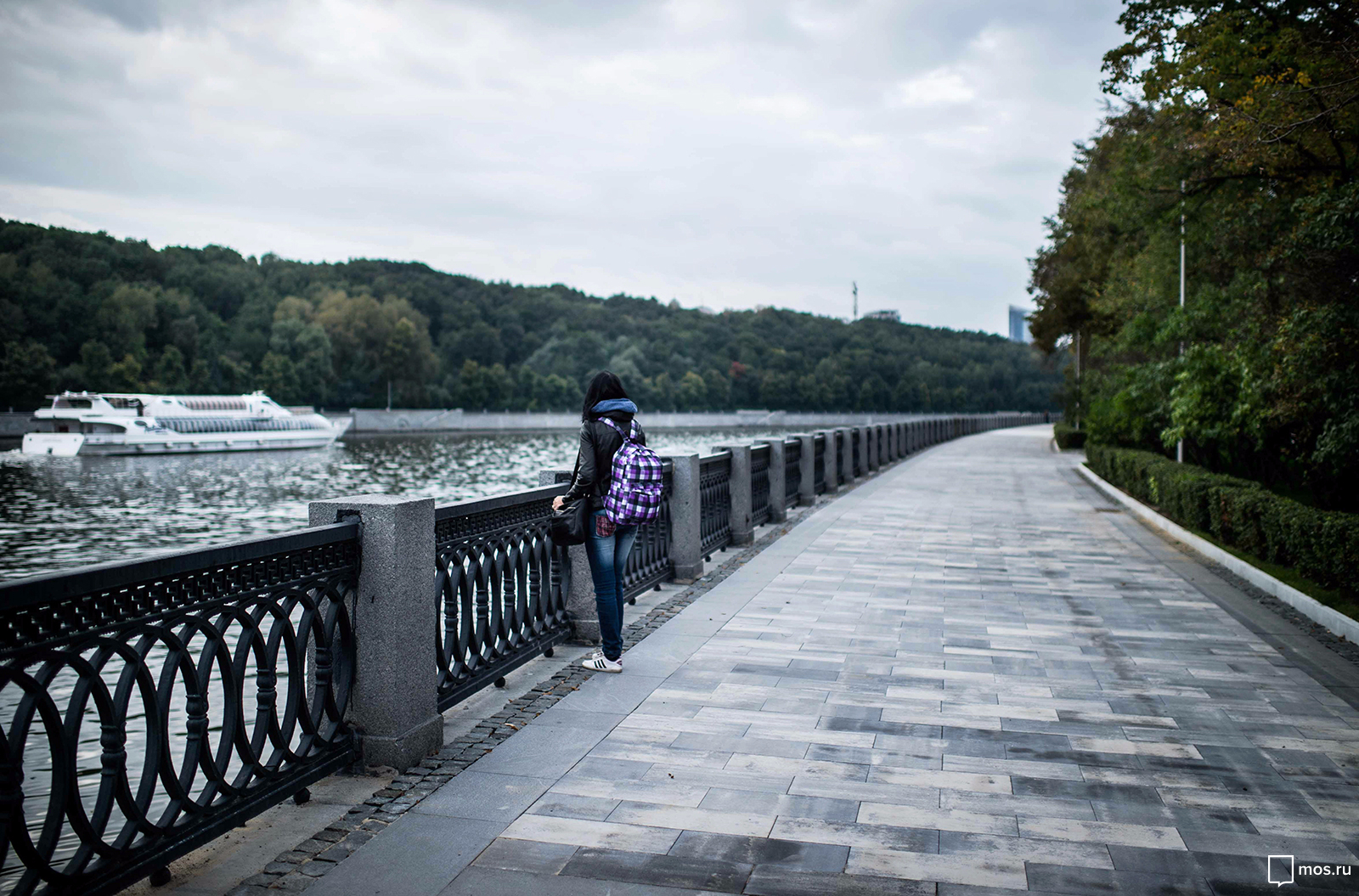
- Interactive map of Luzhnetskaya Embankment
- Native name: Лужнецкая набережная (Russian)
- Location: Moscow, Russia; Central Administrative Okrug
- Nearest metro station: Vorobyovy Gory; Sportivnaya

Luzhnetskaya Embankment is a street and embankment in Khamovniki District of Moscow along the Moskva River.

== Gallery ==
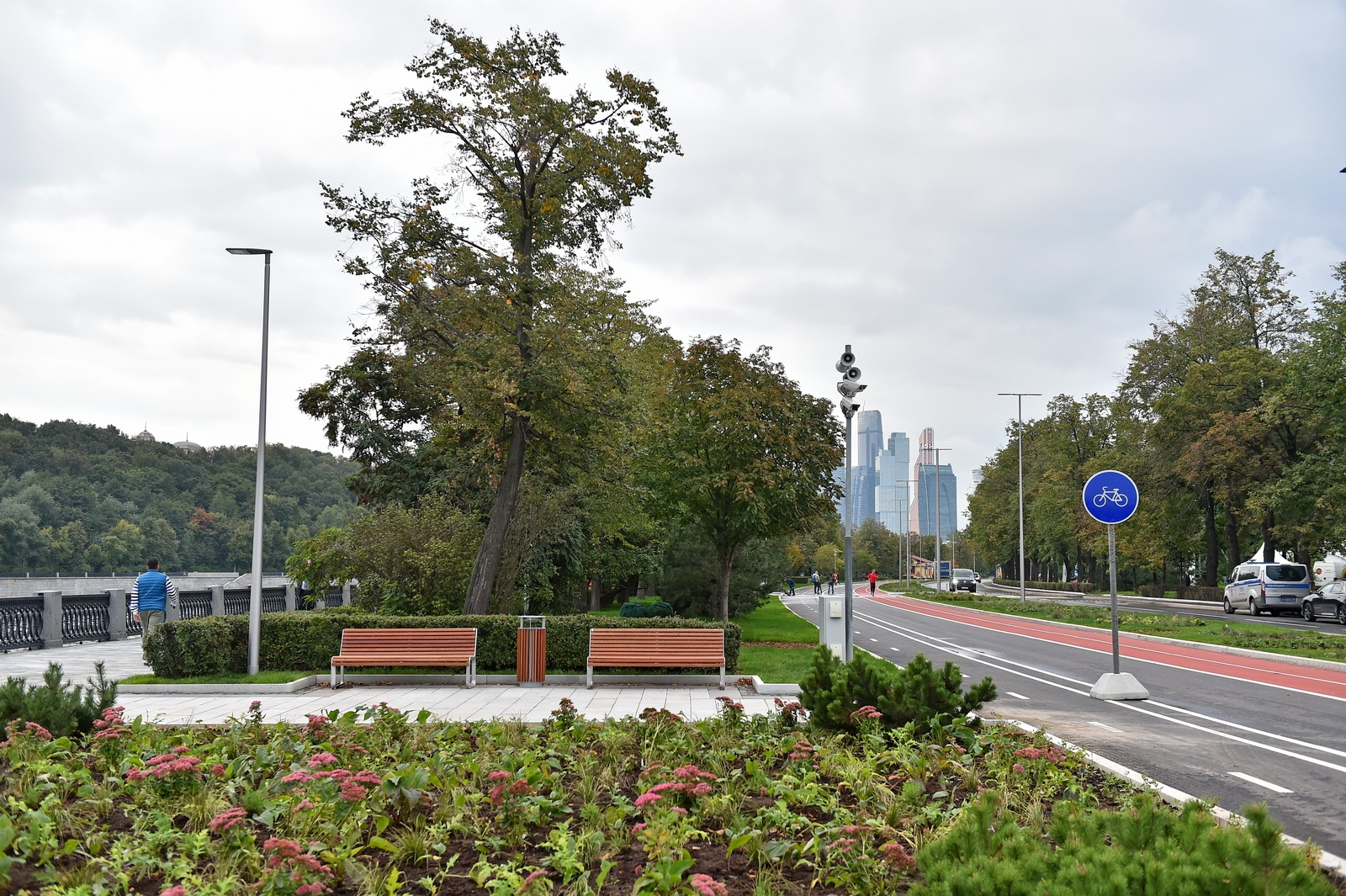

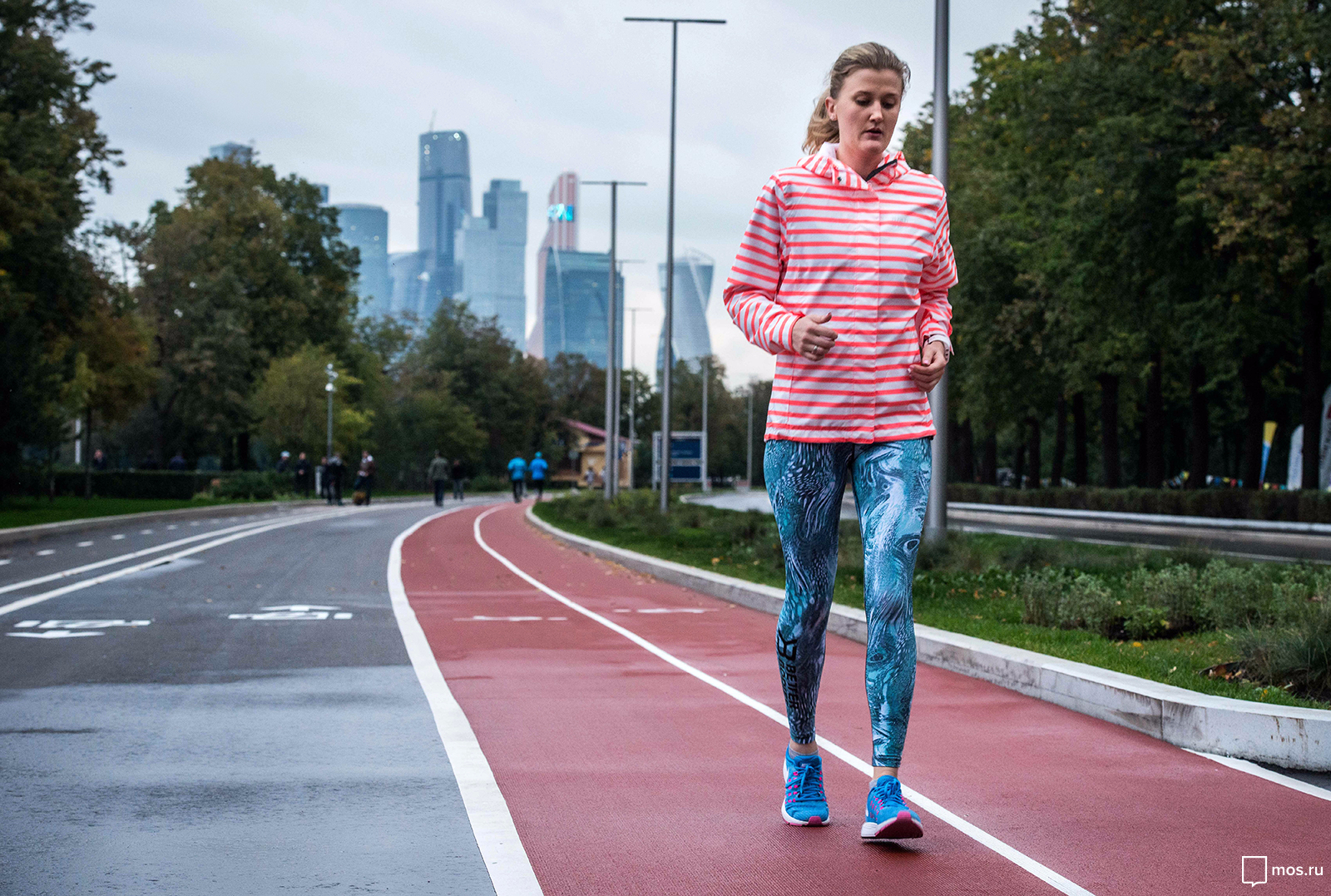

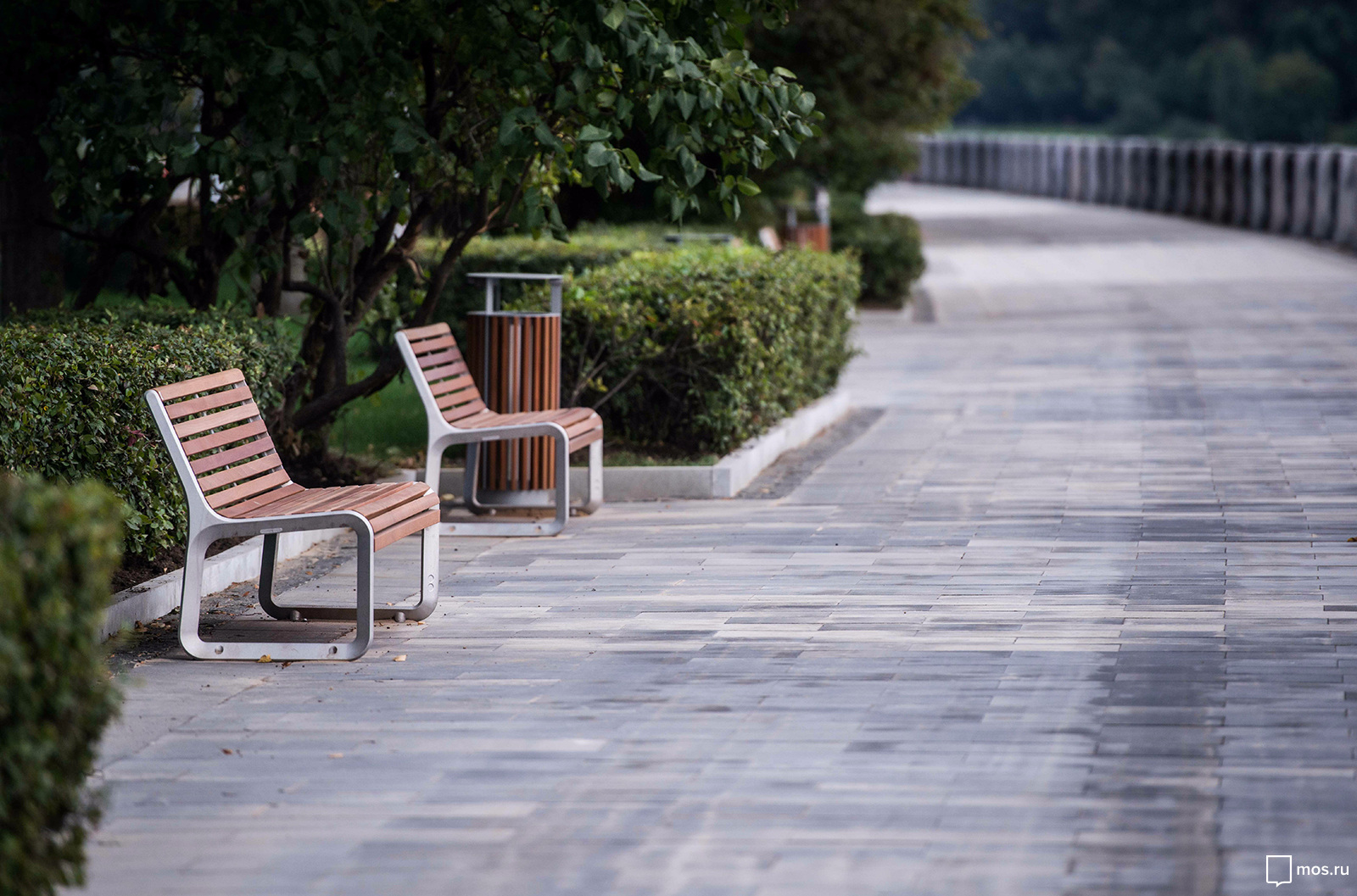

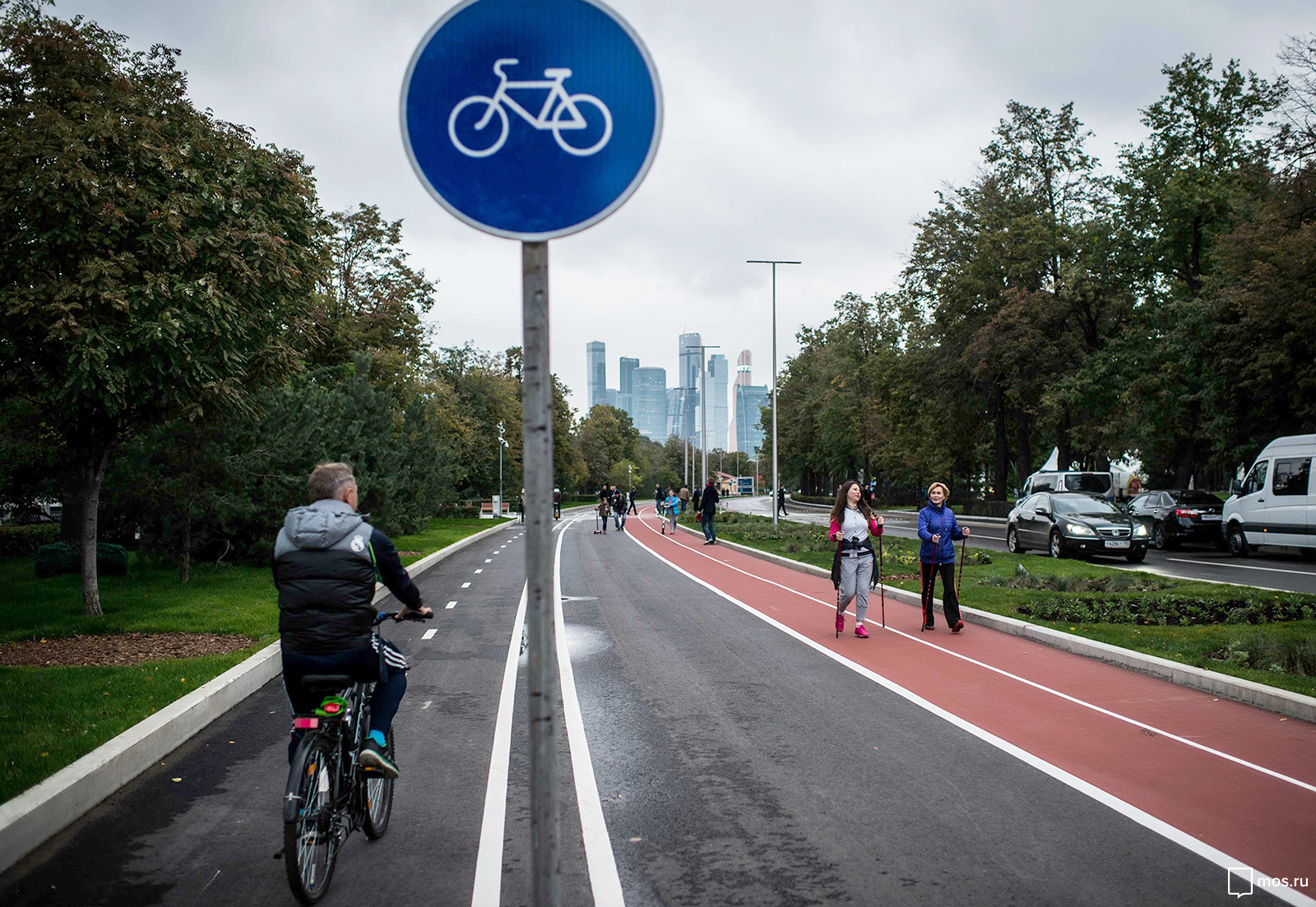

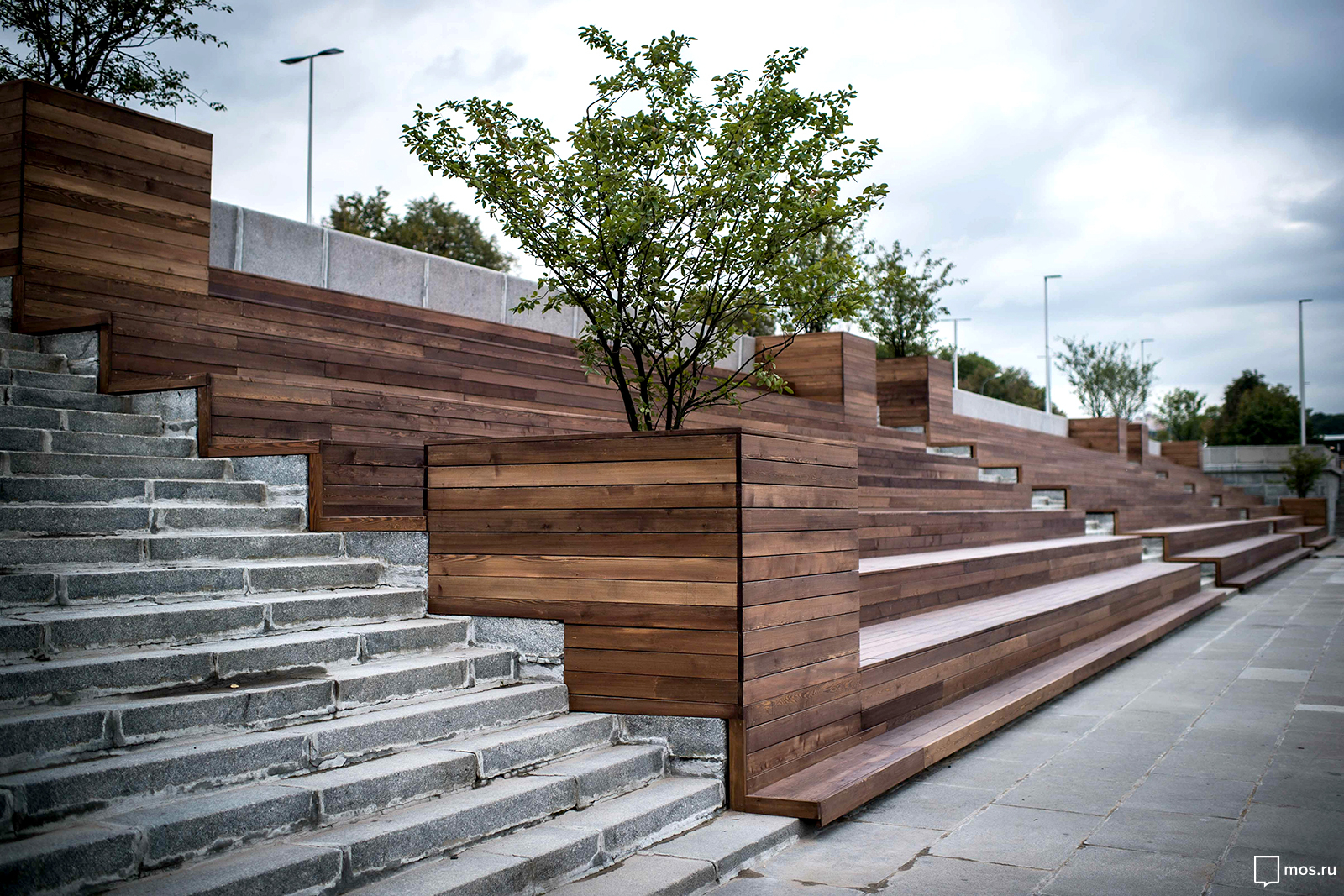
