= Kazakhstan Tennis Federation =

Tennis organization in Kazakhstan

- Sport: Tennis
- Abbreviation: KTF
- Founded: 1992
- Affiliation: International Tennis Federation
- Regional affiliation: Asian Tennis Federation
- Headquarters: National Federations
- Location: Zheltoksan str. 1, Astana,
- President: Bulat Utemuratov

Official website
- www.ktf.kz
- (Kazakhstan)

The Kazakhstan Tennis Federation (KTF; Kazakh: Қазақстан теннис федерациясы, Qazaqstan tennıs federatsııasy) is the governing body for professional and amateur tennis in Kazakhstan. Kazakhstan Tennis Federation operates all of the Kazakhstani national representative tennis sides, including the Kazakhstan Davis Cup team, the Kazakhstan Fed Cup team and youth sides as well. KTF is also responsible for organizing and hosting tennis tournaments within Kazakhstan and scheduling the home international fixtures.

Their main focuses were include amateur tennis development, Team Kazakhstan, regional tennis development, certification program for coaches, tournaments, and training programs for referees. Bulat Utemuratov has been the President of the Kazakhstan Tennis Federation since 2007. The head office is located in Astana. Out of 14 regions in Kazakhstan, the Federation has 12 branches, not counting the two main cities Astana and Almaty.

== Team Kazakhstan ==
The project called the Team Kazakhstan was founded by the President of Tennis Federation of Kazakhstan Bulat Utemuratov on June 1, 2008.

This project was aimed at training prospective tennis players in Kazakhstan to increase their skills. The main aim of the academy is to train prospective players of national teams for the Davis Cup and the Fed Cup tournaments. The project implies the tennis academy providing players with all conditions including participating in tournaments on the international and republican scale, training by world top specialists, educating, accommodation and meals costs, medical care and social adaptation. Education is not pushed to the sidelines in process of training as it is essential part for making up of full-fledged human personality.

== Performance table ==
Legend
— Junior Grand Slam singles champion
— Junior Grand Slam singles runner-up
Universiade (FISU) medalists:

— gold
— silver
— bronze

Asian Games medalists:

— gold
— silver
— bronze

All-time top Kazakhstani tennis players by the number of ATP / WTA (male/female) tour-level singles titles (plus DBL — MX in parentheses, if applied; and singles rating); active players — in bold; former players — in italics; last updated after the 2026 Ningbo Open (ATP), 2026 US Open (WTA)
#	Name & Lifespan	GS	YC	Ma. / 1000 est. 1990	OG	All Titles + CHL + ITF	D / B Cup	AC est. 2020 ↓ UC est. 2023	HC est. 1989 EXH	LC est. 2017 EXH	Endorsements	BH	No. est. 1973 (′76) / 1975 (′84)
Grand Slam singles champions (1)
1	**Elena Rybakina** (b. 1999)	3	1	2	SF	**15** 15 19 (23)	—	NA	—	NA	Yonex (racquets); Nike → Adidas → Yonex (apparel & shoes)	2H	1^{6 w} (48)
Year-End Championships winners with no Grand Slam singles title (0)
Champions of ATP-Masters/ WTA-1000 without GS and/or YEC singles title (0)
Champions without GS and/or YEC and/or ATP-Masters / WTA-1000 singles title (5 players, 3 men's & 2 women's, with 1+ titles each)
2	**Alexander Bublik**; DBL (b. 1997)	QF^{1} (RU^{1})	0	QF^{2}	1R (1R)	**9** 16 20 (22)	—	—	—	—	Yonex → Tecnifibre (racquets); Yoxoi → EA7 (apparel & shoes)	2H	10 (47)
NA	Elena Likhovtseva (b. 1975) before switching to the Russian Federation, also represented the USSR, the CIS & Kazakhstan	SF^{1} (0—2)	0	RU^{1} (4)	1R (2R)	**3** (30—32) 5 (38—40)	—	NA	—	NA	Wilson (racquets); Nike → Diadora (apparel & shoes)	2H	15 (3)
3	**Yulia Putintseva** TEAM (b. 1995)	QF^{3}	0	QF^{2}	1R	**3** 3 9	—	NA	—	NA	Babolat (racquets); Mizuno → K-Swiss (apparel & shoes)	2H	20 (94)
4	Yaroslava Shvedova; TEAM (b. 1987)	QF^{3} (2)	0	QF^{1} (2)	1R ( —1R)	**1** (14) 2 (16) 6 (23)	—	NA	—	NA	Head (racquets); Fila (apparel & shoes)	2H	25 (3)
5	**Andrey Golubev**; TEAM (b. 1987)	2R^{4} (RU^{1})	0	2R^{7}	— (1R—1R)	**1** (2) 8 (25) 13 (34)	—	—	—	—	Head (racquets); Australian (apparel & shoes)	1H	33 (24)
6	**Zarina Diyas** (b. 1993)	4R^{2}	0	2	1R	**1** 1 10	—	NA	—	NA	Dunlop (racquets)	2H	31 (89)
NA	Ksenia Pervak (b. 1991) besides the Russian Federation, also represented Kazakhstan	4R^{1}	0	0	—	**1** 10 (13)	—	NA	—	NA	Wilson (racquets); Adidas (apparel & shoes)	2H/L	37 (123)
7	**Mikhail Kukushkin**; TEAM (b. 1987)	4R^{2}	0	3R^{4}	2R	**1** 17 18 (19)	—	—	—	—	Head (racquets); Sergio Tacchini (apparel & shoes)	2H	39 (67)
Top-75 singles rankings champions without ATP / WTA tour-level singles title (4 players, 3 men's & 1 women's)
8	**Galina Voskoboeva** (b. 1984)	3R^{4} (QF^{4})	0	0	1R (2R)	**0** (5) 0 (6) 3 (22)	—	NA	—	NA	Wilson (racquets); Nike → Peak (apparel & shoes)	2H	42 (26)
9	**Alexander Shevchenko** (b. 2000)	2R^{1}	0	3R^{2}	—	**0** 3 7 (9)	—	—	—	—	Babolat (racquets); Adidas (apparel & shoes)	2H	45 (406)
10	Evgeny Korolev (b. 1988)	3R^{1} (2R^{2})	0	3R^{1}	—	**0** 5 (8) 11 (18)	—	NA	—	NA	Prince (racquets); Adidas (apparel & shoes)	2H	46 (113)
11	**Aleksandr Nedovyesov**; MX; TEAM (b. 1987)	2R^{2} (3R^{1})	0	0	—	**0** (3) 3 (31) 9 (50)	—	—	—	—	Babolat (racquets); Nike → Australian (apparel & shoes)	2H	72 (39)
Champions of team cups and/or DBL—MX Grand Slams without ATP / WTA tour-level singles title (1 women's player)
12	**Anna Danilina**; DBL; MX (b. 1995)	0 (RU^{2}—1)	0	0 (1)	—	**0** (10—11) 0 (12—14) 1 (40—41)	—	—	—	—	Wilson (racquets); Nike → Mizuno (apparel & shoes)	2H	269 (10)
Other notable players
13	**Denis Yevseyev**; DBL (b. 1993)	0	0	0	—	**0** 1 9 (19)	—	—	—	—	Head (racquets)	2H	238 (247)
14	Amina Rakhim; DBL (b. 1989)	0	0	0	0	**0** 1 (5)	—	NA	—	NA	Babolat (racquets)	2H	259 (215)
15	Kamila Kerimbayeva; TEAM (b. 1995)	0	0	0	—	**0** 0 10 (18)	—	—	—	—	Wilson (racquets)	2H	291 (303)
16	**Zhibek Kulambayeva** (b. 2000)	0	0	0	—	**0** 0 5 (35)	—	—	—	—	Wilson (racquets)	2H	371 (136)
17	**Gozal Ainitdinova**; DBL (b. 1998)	0	0	0	—	**0** 0 2 (7)	—	—	—	—	Wilson (racquets)	2H	396 (333)
18	Madina Rakhim; DBL (b. 1985)	0	0	0	0	**0**	—	NA	—	NA	Babolat (racquets)	2H	—
NA	Marina Kroschina SGL; DBL (1953—2000), represented the USSR: from the Kazakh SSR (now Kazakhstan) and then from the Ukrainian SSR (now Ukraine)	3R^{3}	NA	NA	NA	0 0 (3)	—	NA	NA	NA	Dunlop (racquets)	1H	—
