= Lev Urusov =

Russian diplomat

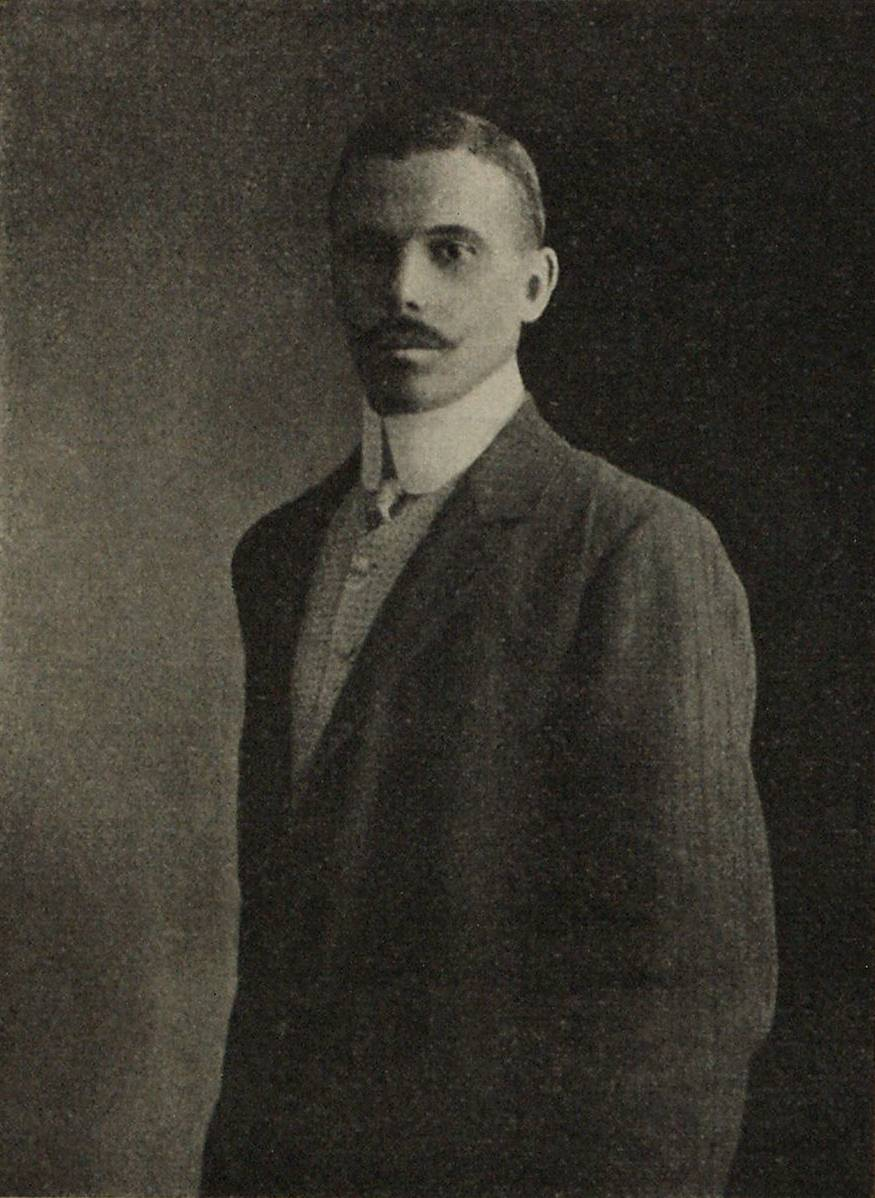
Lev Urusov

Prince Lev Vladimirovich Urusov (Russian: Лев Владимирович Урусов, French: Leon Ouroussoff, December 31, 1877, Saint Petersburg — 1933 (aged 55–56), Paris) was a Russian diplomat. From 1910 until his death, he was a member of the International Olympic Committee.

== Life ==
Lev Urusov was born in the family of State Councillor and Chamberlain Vladimir Pavlovich Urusov. In 1898, he graduated from Alexandrovski Lyceum in Saint Petersburg and the same year started his career at the Ministry of Foreign Affairs. His two big assignments came in 1910–1912 when he was appointed a head of the Russian diplomatic mission in Bulgaria, and then in 1912–1916 when he served as the first secretary at the Russian embassy in Japan. In 1917, after October Revolution in Russia, Lev Urusov emigrated to France and lived there until his death in 1933.

Prince Urusov was one of the leading tennis players in Russia in those years. In 1907, he won the Championship of Saint Petersburg, and the next year he became the Champion of Russia. In 1913, during his diplomatic mission in Japan, he won the Open Championship of Tokyo. In 1910, he was elected a member of the International Olympic Committee. He retained this position even after the revolution and remained the only official representative of Russia in the IOC in the years since. After the end of the World War he repeatedly submitted proposals for incorporating Russian teams back into the Olympic movement. Prior to the 1920 Olympics, he suggested that a team of Russian emigrants may compete, while four years later he asked for the participation of two teams, one composed of the emigrants and another representing Soviet Russia. The proposals were rejected, and Pierre de Coubertin later wrote that he regretted this rejection. The rejection was based on the fact that Soviet Russia has not been recognized yet by the IOC while the emigrants were not representing a distinct existing country.

In 2008, Prince Lev Urusov was inducted into the Tennis Hall of Fame of Russia. Reporters were informed that no relatives of Lev Urusov remained in Russia and that his award will wait in Russia till his relatives abroad claim it.
