= Babolat =

French tennis, badminton, and padel equipment company

- Industry: Sports equipment
- Founded: 1875; 151 years ago
- Founder: Pierre Babolat
- Headquarters: Lyon, France
- Key people: Éric Babolat (CEO)
- Products: Racquets, strings, accessories and shoes
- Revenue: €141.2 million (2014)
- Number of employees: 369
- Website: babolat.com

Babolat (/ˈbɑːboʊlɑː/, French pronunciation: [babɔla]) is a French tennis, badminton, pickleball, and padel equipment company, headquartered in Lyon, best known for its strings and tennis racquets which are used by professional and recreational players worldwide. The company has made strings since 1875, when Pierre Babolat created the first strings made of natural gut. Babolat continued to focus on strings until 1994, when it became a "total tennis" company, also producing racquet frames and selling them in Europe. It then expanded sales to Japan, and later to the United States in 2000. Sales of Babolat racquets increased rapidly in North America and Europe. Babolat is also a pioneer in connected sport technology and launched a connected tennis racket in 2014 and a connected wrist-worn tennis wearable with PIQ in 2015. The Babolat Pop is one of the leaders in tennis sensors worldwide.

== Notable products ==
=== Strings ===
Some of the strings produced by Babolat include RPM Blast, one of the most popular polyester strings known for its spin potential, and VS Gut, a leading and original natural gut string.

=== Racquets ===
Babolat's current tennis racquet line-up includes Pure Drive, a power-oriented racquet used by players such as Carlos Moyá, Kim Clijsters, Andy Roddick and Li Na, Pure Aero (formerly AeroPro Drive), known for its spin potential and usage by Rafael Nadal, Caroline Wozniacki and Carlos Alcaraz, and Pure Strike, a control-oriented racquet used by players such as Dominic Thiem and Cameron Norrie.

== Sponsorships ==
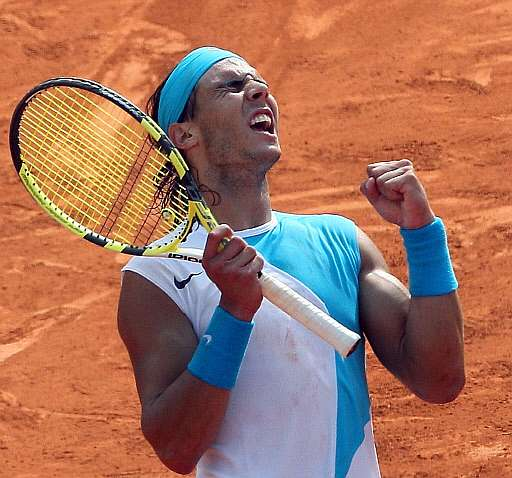
Rafael Nadal holding a Babolat AeroPro Drive at the 2007 edition of Roland-Garros

Some of Babolat's sponsored players include:

=== Tennis ===
==== Men ====
- (Argentina) Federico Delbonis
- (Australia) Jordan Thompson
- (Canada) Félix Auger-Aliassime
- (China) Shang Juncheng
- (Denmark) Holger Rune
- (Spain) Carlos Alcaraz
- (Spain) Albert Ramos Viñolas
- (France) Arthur Cazaux
- (France) Arthur Fils
- (France) Stéphane Houdet
- (France) Benoît Paire
- (France) Giovanni Mpetshi Perricard
- (United Kingdom) Cameron Norrie
- (United Kingdom) Luke Watson
- (Italy) Fabio Fognini
- (Japan) Taro Daniel
- (Japan) Yosuke Watanuki
- (Kazakhstan) Alexander Shevchenko
- (Russia) Evgeny Donskoy
- (Sweden) Elias Ymer
- (Sweden) Mikael Ymer
- (United States) Maxime Cressy
- (United States) Ryan Harrison
- (United States) Sam Querrey

==== Women ====
- (Belgium) Yanina Wickmayer
- (Canada) Leylah Fernandez
- (China) Wang Xinyu
- (China) Zheng Saisai
- (Colombia) Camila Osorio
- (Croatia) Ana Konjuh
- (Czech Republic) Karolína Plíšková
- (France) Clara Burel
- (United Kingdom) Heather Watson
- (Italy) Lucia Bronzetti
- (Italy) Sara Errani
- (Kazakhstan) Yulia Putintseva
- (Philippines) Alexandra Eala
- (United States) Jennifer Brady
- (United States) Sofia Kenin
- (Brazil) Laura Pigossi

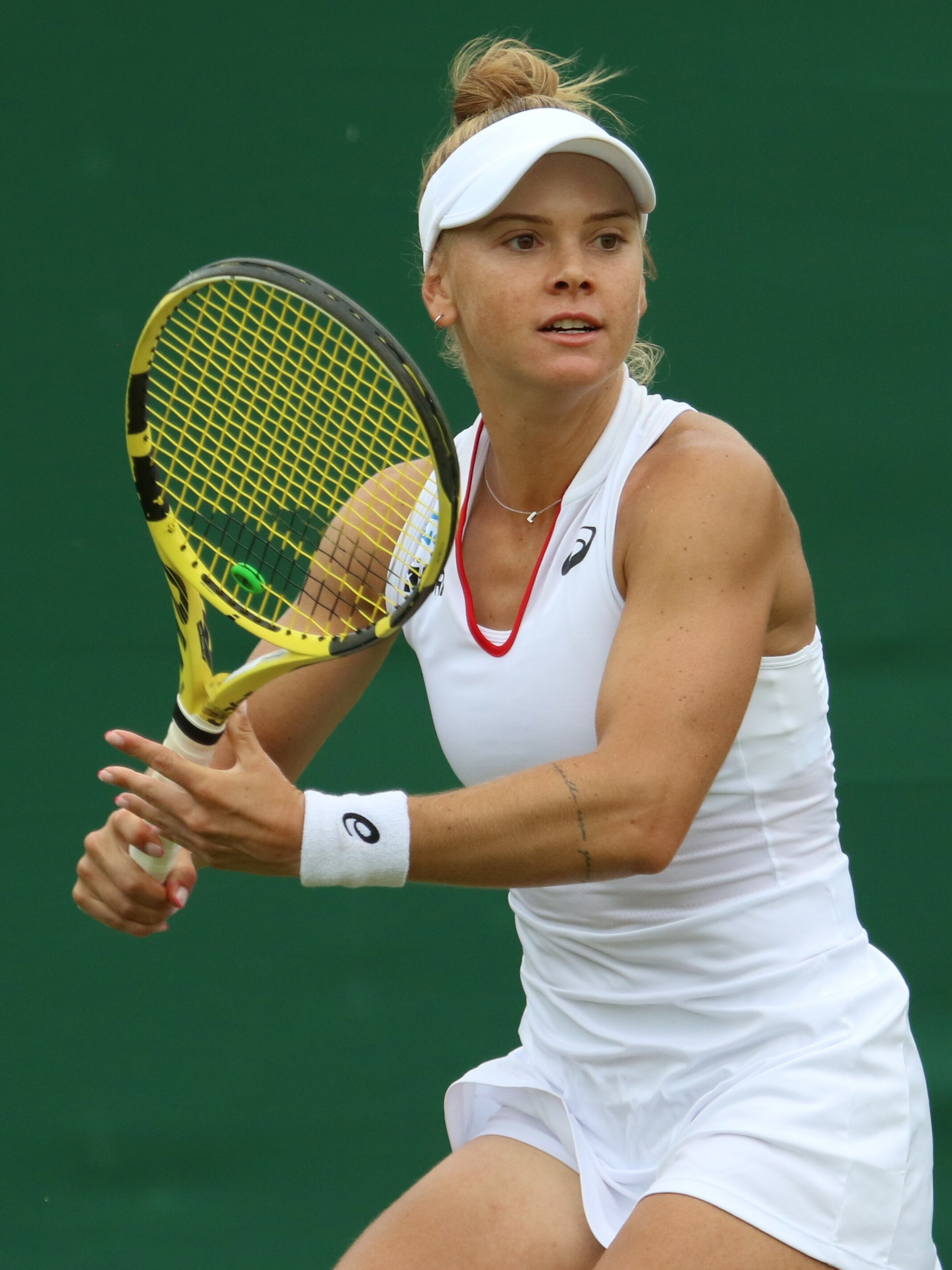
Laura Pigossi holding a Babolat racquet at the 2023 edition of the Wimbledon Championships

==== Retired players ====
- (Argentina) Mariano Puerta
- (Australia) Samuel Groth
- (Austria) Dominic Thiem
- (Belgium) Kim Clijsters
- (Belgium) Kirsten Flipkens
- (Chile) Fernando González
- (China) Li Na
- (China) Peng Shuai
- (Croatia) Mirjana Lučić-Baroni
- (Czech Republic) Kristýna Plíšková
- (Spain) Carlos Moyá
- (Spain) Garbiñe Muguruza
- (Spain) Rafael Nadal
- (Estonia) Anett Kontaveit
- (France) Alizé Cornet
- (France) Pauline Parmentier
- (France) Jo-Wilfried Tsonga
- (United Kingdom) Johanna Konta
- (Germany) Julia Görges
- (Italy) Francesca Schiavone
- (Japan) Yūichi Sugita
- (Poland) Agnieszka Radwańska
- (Russia) Nadia Petrova
- (Russia) Dinara Safina
- (Russia) Elena Vesnina
- (Serbia) Viktor Troicki
- (Switzerland) Timea Bacsinszky
- (Slovakia) Dominika Cibulková
- (United States) CiCi Bellis
- (United States) Jack Sock
- (Denmark) Caroline Wozniacki

=== Badminton ===
==== Men ====
- (Algeria) Koceila Mammeri
- (France) Lucas Corvée
- (France) Ronan Labar

==== Women ====
- (Algeria) Tanina Mammeri
- (England) Chloe Birch
- (France) Qi Xuefei
- (France) Anne Tran

== Controversy ==
Despite initial statements indicating a cessation of business with Russia following the 2022 Russian invasion of Ukraine, Babolat products remain available in the country. According to research from the Yale School of Management, Babolat’s operations in Russia are conducted through an independent distributor, with whom Babolat has reportedly ceased direct transactions. However, this distributor continues to sell Babolat products and identifies as a Babolat-affiliated distributor.
