= Ektelon =

American sporting goods manufacturer

- Company type: Subsidiary of Prince Sports
- Industry: Sporting goods
- Founded: 1964
- Headquarters: Bordentown Township, New Jersey, United States
- Key people: Franklin W. "Bud" Held, founder
- Products: Racquetball racquets, Apparel, Accessories, Racquetball Equipment, Eyeguards, Footwear
- Parent: Prince Americas, LLC

Ektelon, Inc. was an American manufacturer of equipment for racquetball.

Originally based in Bordentown, New Jersey, Ektelon was founded by Franklin W. "Bud" Held in 1964 as the first company to manufacture racquetball racquets and stringing machines, not long after the development of the sport of racquetball by Joe Sobek. Working from Held's garage in San Diego, California, the company initially set out to build aluminum tennis racquets and a racquet stringing machine. With the development of metal tennis racquets, the old techniques of stringing wooden racquets no longer worked, and Held saw the need for a new machine. Held is credited for one of the first patented designs for a racquet stringing machine. He named the company Ektelon based on a combination of two Greek words: "ektein", meaning to stretch out, and "telon", representing the concept of perfection.

In 1970, Ektelon produced the first experimental racquetball racquet for Bud Muehleisen, a top racquetball player and early legend of the sport. The company moved into a larger facility in San Diego to begin manufacturing racquetball racquets on a larger scale. Over the years, Ektelon has introduced a number of new racquetball technologies, including the first racquetball racquet made of high-strength aluminum (1971), the first handlaid composite racquet (1978), the first oversized aluminum racquets (1984), and continues to develop new technologies in racquet design such as the elimination of string holes (O^{3}). In 1988, Prince Sports purchased Ektelon and the brand remained prominent among racquetball equipment manufacturers for several decades thereafter.

As a subsidiary of Prince Sports, Ektelon changed ownership and management multiple times before disappearing among the holdings of Authentic Brands Group in 2012. As late as 2015, the Ektelon brand name was referenced as an ABG property, but all manufacturing had ceased, with existing inventory disposed and player programs discontinued by the following year. A Restrung Magazine annual re-cap in 2016 detailed The Quiet Death of Ektelon with added insights, and the company website later went dark.

In 2022, the Ektelon brand came out with a set of Pickleball paddles , although few details are available on the role of the Ektelon in manufacturing and development of these paddles.

== Ektelon involvement in racquetball tournaments ==
Ektelon sponsors numerous tournaments and tours nationally and internationally, including:

- US Racquetball Association
- National Intercollegiate Championships
- National Doubles Championships
- National Singles Championships
- Racquetball World Championships
- World Outdoor Racquetball (WOR) Championships
- International Racquetball Tour
- International Racquetball Federation
- Classic Professional Racquetball Tour
- Racquet for the Cure
- Women's Professional Racquetball Organization

== Professional Ektelon Players (International Racquetball Tour - IRT) ==
Previous World Top 100 IRT Professionals

- (United States) Jose Rojas
- (United States) Jansen Allen
- (United States) Charlie Pratt
- (United States) Adam Manilla
- (United States) Andy Hawthorne
- (United States) Farshid Guilak
- (United States) Dylan Reid
- (United States) Ryan Maher
- (United States) Marco Bertarelli

Team Ektelon Players

- (United States) Nick Montalbano
- (United States) Ricky Diaz
- (United States) Richard Aal
- (United States) Anthony Wong
- (United States) Bill Gorge
- (United States) Michael Baker
- (United States) Yee Cheng
- (United States) Steve Cook
- (United States) Daniel De La Rosa
- (United States) Alex Ackerman
- (United States) Ruben Gonzalez

Ladies Professional Racquetball Tour (LPRT) Players

- (United States) Rhonda Rajsich
- (Ecuador) Veronica Sotomayor
- (United States) Michelle Key
- (United States) Jessica Parrilla

Outdoor Pros (WOR) Players

- (United States) Craig Clubber Lane
- (United States) Scott Davis
- (United States) Bill Gorge
- (United States) Andy Hawthorne
- (United States) Gary Martin
- (United States) Son Nguyen
- (United States) Mike Orr
- (United States) Jose Rojas
- (United States) Rick Sandello
- (United States) Robert Sostre
- (United States) Jesus Ustarroz
- (United States) Dillon Silver
- (United States) Greg Solis
- (Ecuador) Veronica Sotomayor
- (United States) Tracy Hawthorne
- (United States) Kris Kaskawal
- (United States) Michelle Key
- (United States) Aubrey O'Brien

Junior Elite Players

- (United States) James D'Ambrogia
- (United States) Justus Benson
- (United States) Lily Berry
- (United States) Sam Bredenbeck
- (United States) Daniel Rojas
- (United States) Dane Elkins
- (United States) Sebastian Fernandez
- (United States) Sabrina Viscuso
- (United States) Ben Jenkel
- (United States) Jonathan Lanford
- (United States) Victoria Leon
- (United States) Sawyer Lloyd
- (United States) Heather Mahoney
- (United States) Adam Manilla
- (United States) Erika Manilla
- (United States) Devon Pimentelli
- (United States) Sam Reid
- (United States) Chase Robison
- (United States) Ricky Diaz
- (United States) Julian Singh
