= Prince original graphite =

Tennis racquet manufactured by Prince Sports

The Prince original graphite, or the "POG" as it is called, or "The Original G" is a tennis racquet manufactured by Prince Sports. It was first introduced in 1980 and has been used by numerous world-class tennis players, including Andre Agassi, Michael Chang, Gabriela Sabatini, and Monica Seles.

The Graphite is a full-weighted tennis racquet with a box-shaped 19 mm beam, characterized by the Cross Bar Stabilizer, which reduces twisting on off-center hits. Most, if not all, versions were offered in either mid-size or oversized head. The racquet also featured a signature foam handle with a leather grip.

Prince produced various versions of this racquet from the original in 1978 until 2016, including the Prince Graphite (The very original version with single-stripe, teardrop-shaped head, and grommetless; c. 1978), Prince Graphite (The second issue with single-stripe, teardrop-shaped head, but with single grommets; c. 1980) Prince Graphite (Single-stripe version, with normal-shaped head and grommets from now on; c. 1983), Prince Graphite (Four-Stripe version; c. 1987), Prince Straight Shaft, Prince Graphite Tour and the Prince Classic Graphite.
