= Wilson K-Factor =

Type of Wilson tennis racquets

Wilson K-Factor refers to the generation of Wilson Sporting Goods tennis racquets that incorporate the "K-Factor" technology. These racquets were first revealed in 2007 and are still popular among players. Roger Federer and Venus Williams making them extremely popular for the short time as these racquets quickly became best sellers.

The K-Factor line of racquets boasts of having all of the strengths from the previous generation of nCode racquets while also having the unique "K-Factor". The K-Factor generation has four main components (K)arophite Black, (K)onnector, (K)ontour Yoke, and (K)ompact Center.

(K)arophite Black refers to the combining of Carbon Black from the original nCode racquets with graphite and SiO_{2} to create a dense and strong racquet matrix.

(K)onnector refers to the two wings molded on each side of the racquet that increase dwell time of the ball when it hits the racquet thereby providing more control and comfort as well as a larger sweet spot.

(K)ontour Yoke refers to the cross-sectional shape of the frame that enhances stiffness to increase stability of the racquet.

(K)ompact Center refers to the shorter yoke design that improves stability, maneuverability, and handling.
