= Wolfgang Bernhard Liedtke =

German-American neurologist and corporate executive

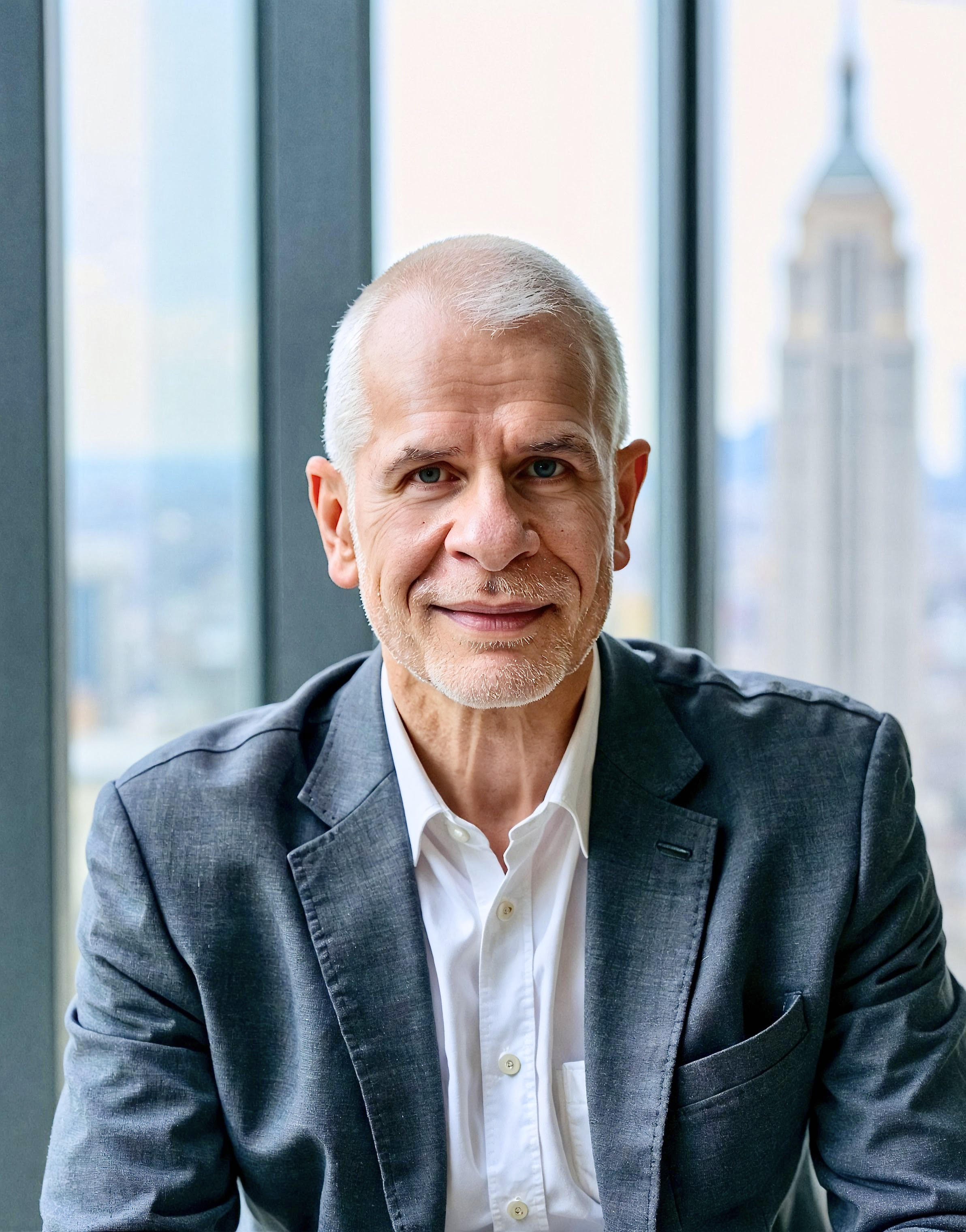

Wolfgang Bernhard Liedtke is a German-American neurologist and biotech-pharma executive currently serving as Senior Vice President and Global Head of Neurology at Anavex Life Sciences (New York NY). In this role, he leads late-stage clinical development in Alzheimer's and Parkinson's disease, the open-label extension of Anavex' registrational Alzheimer's trial AD-004 — conducted in synchrony with the European Medicines Agency — as well as early-stage clinical development in schizophrenia (trial SZ-001). He was previously a corporate executive at Regeneron Pharmaceuticals in Tarrytown, New York, where he served as Chair of Neurology, Psychiatry, Pain Medicine, and Sensory Systems on the Scientific Council in Global Development (Genetic Medicines) from 2021 to 2024.

Liedtke also holds positions as an adjunct professor of Neurology at Duke University in Durham, North Carolina, and as an adjunct professor at New York University (NYU) College of Dentistry in New York City, where he is affiliated with the Department of Molecular Pathobiology and Dental Pain Research. He is also a Member of the NYU Pain Research Center.

== Early life and education ==
Liedtke was born in Dortmund, Germany. He was educated in Germany in higher education and studied medicine at Ruhr University Bochum as a scholar of the German Academic Scholarship Foundation (Studienstiftung des Deutschen Volkes). After MD (University of Cologne), PhD (virology, Ruhr University Bochum, graduating magna cum laude), residencies in neurology (University Hospitals of Tuebingen Essen, Germany), psychiatry (University Hospital and State Psychiatric Hospital, Essen) and fellowship in neuropathology (Albert Einstein College of Medicine of Yeshiva University in The Bronx, New York City, supported by the Alexander von Humboldt Foundation, Bonn, Germany, recipient of a Feodor Lynen Fellowship. Liedtke joined the metabolism-genetics laboratory of Howard Hughes Investigator Jeffrey M. Friedman at the Rockefeller University in New York City, NY, as a Senior Research Associate and then as a Research Assistant Professor (1997-2004).

== Career ==
Liedtke was selected as the Ebert Clinical Fellow-Klingenstein Fellow of the Klingenstein Fund in 2004. From 2004 to 2021, Liedtke held the position of scientist-physician academic professor at Duke University, where he focused on discoveries related to TRPV4. He was awarded tenure in 2014 and became a full professor in 2016.

In 2013, he was selected as a Harrington Discovery Institute Scholar-Innovator of the Harrington Discovery Institute in Cleveland, Ohio, and in 2019 he presented the Blaustein Pain Lecture at Johns Hopkins Hospital in Baltimore.

In 2020, Liedtke was selected Fellow of the Innovation-to-Impact Entrepreneurship Program of Yale University.

In April 2021, he joined Regeneron, where he is a member of the Scientific Council in Global Development - Genetic Medicines.

In November 2023, Liedtke was elected to the American Clinical and Climatological Association in Little Rock, Arkansas, one of 250 member physicians.

As a physician in the Duke Health system, he provided clinical care in his neurology and anesthesiology clinics. Liedtke treated patients suffering from refractory pain, mostly nerve pain of the trigeminal and glossopharyngeal nerve, but also oro-facial-head pain and generalized nerve pain. At Duke University, he was a Distinguished Nominee for the Leonard Tow Humanism in Medicine Award in 2017 and 2018 (Gold Foundation, Englewood Cliffs, NJ).

Since August 2021, he has been a member of the Medical Advisory Board of the Facial Pain Association (FPA), serving as their Lead Neurologist, also since 2024 as their Medical Lead of the FPA's Patient Registry.

By mid-2024, he was selected as Senior Advisor to the Davos Alzheimer's Collaborative.

=== Scientific work ===
Liedtke first described the TRPV4 ion channel, originally named vanilloid receptor-related osmotically activated channel (VR-OAC), the first vertebrate osmotically activated ion channel.

His original report on TRPV4, published in the journal Cell, has been widely cited in the scientific community, with 1594 references as of October 2024 (1154 references in SCOPUS).

Liedtke described TRPV4 as the first vertebrate osmoreceptor ion channel with possible wide organismal physiologic function including sensory function and pain. He then characterized TRPV4 in live animals, mice and worms. In worms, he identified TRPV4 as a functional orthologue of the ancestral TRPV channel, OSM-9, for mechanical and osmotic sensing.

TRPV4 was the first TRPV channel discovered outside of David Julius' research group. Liedtke characterized the role of TRPV4 in trigeminal pain as well as its role as a UVB receptor in epithelial skin cells and in itch, including in debilitating itch associated with chronic liver disease. Rooted in his TRPV4-pain related discoveries, he co-founded the pain research group at Duke University.

A symposium titled "20 years of TRPV4 – Exploring Science, Discovery, and Future Directions" was organized by InsideScientific, with official support from the American Physiological Society. Liedtke served as the Program Chair for this international conference, which covered scientific topics of mammalian physiology and human health, related to Liedtke's discovery of TRPV4 and its therapeutic impact. Liedtke had 104 peer-reviewed scientific publications linked to TRPV4 in SCOPUS as of June 2023. He is the most active contributor to the field, with approximately 5% of all peer-reviewed publications related to TRPV4. His TRPV4-related work has been referenced 12597 times, accounting for 14.2% of the entire TRPV4 field's citations.

In addition to his work on the identification of TRPV4, Liedtke published discoveries on gene regulation of the Kcc2/KCC2 gene, which maintains low intraneuronal chloride levels in the central nervous system (CNS), thus enabling normal CNS function in vertebrates. This mechanism is derailed in chronic pain, epilepsy, traumatic injury of the brain and spinal cord, likely neurodegeneration and psychoses, and possibly Long-Neuro-COVID.

Liedtke also contributed to the understanding of cartilage mechanobiology, working together with Farshid Guilak.

=== Entrepreneurial activities ===
Liedtke holds six granted U.S. patents related to TRPV4 and is a contributor on eight additional pending patents based on TRPV4-related discoveries in his laboratory.

The following granted U.S. patents list Liedtke as lead inventor: 9290489, 9701675, 10329265, 11014896, 11229628, 11564911.
