= Luke Lachey =

American football player (born 2001)

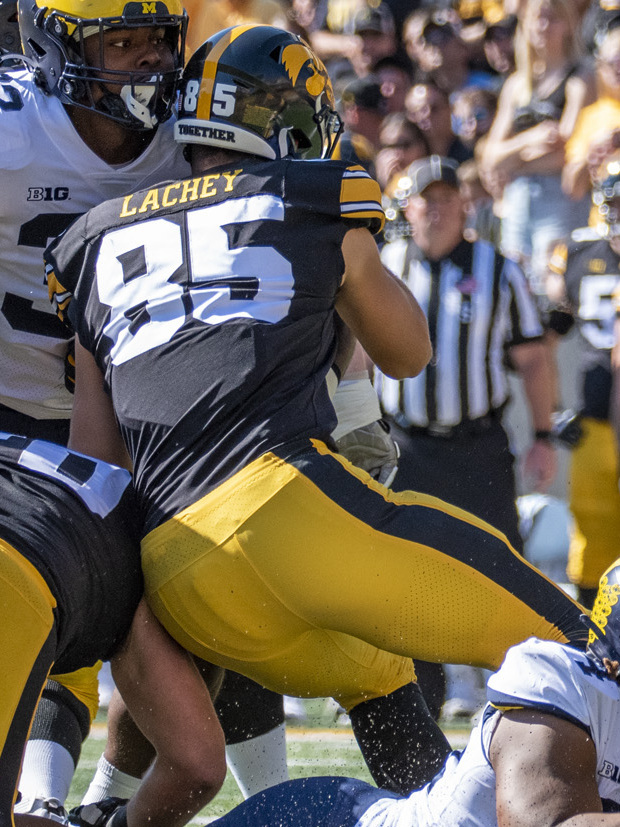

Profile
- Position: Tight end

Personal information
- Born: June 29, 2001 (age 25); Columbus, Ohio, U.S.
- Listed height: 6 ft 6 in (1.98 m)
- Listed weight: 250 lb (113 kg)

Career information
- High school: Grandview Heights (Grandview Heights, Ohio)
- College: Iowa (2020–2024)
- NFL draft: 2025: 7th round, 255th overall pick

Career history
- Houston Texans (2025)*; Green Bay Packers (2026)*
- * Offseason or practice squad member only
- Stats at Pro Football Reference

Luke Lachey (la-SHAY; born June 29, 2001) is an American professional football tight end. He played college football for the Iowa Hawkeyes and was selected by the Houston Texans in the seventh round of the 2025 NFL draft.

== Early life ==
Lachey attended Grandview Heights High School in Grandview Heights, Ohio. He played wide receiver, tight end, and defensive back in high school. He committed to the University of Iowa to play college football.

== College career ==
After redshirting his first year at Iowa in 2020, Lachey played in 13 games with three starts in 2021 and had eight receptions for 133 yards. In 2022, he started six of 13 games and had 28 receptions for 398 yards and four touchdowns. Lachey returned to Iowa for his junior season in 2023. In 2024, he was the team captain and had 28 receptions for 231 yards.

== Professional career ==
Pre-draft measurables
Height	Weight	Arm length	Hand span	Wingspan	40-yard dash	10-yard split	20-yard split	20-yard shuttle	Three-cone drill	Vertical jump	Broad jump
6 ft 5 3/4 in (1.97 m)	251 lb (114 kg)	32 1/8 in (0.82 m)	10 in (0.25 m)	6 ft 6 3/8 in (1.99 m)	4.86 s	1.69 s	2.81 s	4.33 s	7.18 s	35.0 in (0.89 m)	10 ft 0 in (3.05 m)
All values from NFL Combine/Pro Day

=== Houston Texans ===
Lachey was selected by the Houston Texans with the 255th overall pick of the seventh round in the 2025 NFL draft. He was waived on August 26 as part of final roster cuts, and re-signed to the practice squad. On January 20, 2026, Lachey signed a reserve/futures contract with Houston. He was waived by the Texans on May 11.

=== Green Bay Packers ===
On May 12, 2026, Lachey was claimed off of waivers by the Green Bay Packers. However, he was waived by Green Bay two days later with a failed physical designation. Lachey was re-signed on June 15. He was waived/injured on August 4.

== Personal life ==
His father is former professional football player Jim Lachey.
