= Farshid Guilak =

American engineer and orthopedist

Academic background
- Education: BS, MS, Rensselaer Polytechnic Institute; M.Phil, 1990, PhD, mechanical engineering, 1992, Columbia University
- Thesis: Cell-matrix interactions and metabolic changes in articular cartilage under compression (1992)

Academic work
- Institutions: Washington University School of Medicine; Shriners Hospitals for Children; Duke University

Farshid Guilak is an American engineer and orthopedic researcher. He is the Mildred B. Simon Professor of Orthopaedic Surgery at Washington University in St. Louis and director of research at Shriners Hospitals for Children. He is also on the faculty of the departments of Biomedical Engineering, Mechanical Engineering & Materials Science, and Developmental Biology at Washington University.

He is considered one of the top-ranked scientists in the world, ranked #1 in the field of orthopaedics & traumatology, #12 in the field of Biomedical Engineering, and regularly listed as one of highly cited scientists with h-index over 100.

== Early life and education ==
Guilak completed his Bachelor of Science and Master's degree from Rensselaer Polytechnic Institute and his PhD at Columbia University.

== Career ==
=== Duke ===
Following his PhD, Guilak joined the faculty at Duke University School of Medicine as an assistant professor and shortly thereafter became the director of research for the Division of Orthopedic Surgery. Shortly after joining the faculty, Guilak was honored with the Kappa Delta Award from the American Academy of Orthopaedic Surgeons for his study of cartilage cells and discovery of how they responded to stress on the joint. In 2000, Guilak received the Y.C. Fung Young Investigator Award to investigate the effects of biomechanical forces on articular cartilage. During his early tenure at Duke, Guilak was recognized by the American Institute for Medical and Biological Engineering for his "pioneering work in chondrocyte and mechanobiology, and functional tissue engineering of articular cartilage." Following this, Guilak led a team of researchers in developing a three-dimensional fabric scaffold into which stem cells could be seeded and successfully develop into articular cartilage tissue. Based on this research, Guilak found a way to create artificial replacement tissue with durable hydrogels that mimics both the strength and flexibility of native cartilage. More recently, he and his collaborators showed proof-of-concept that 3D weaving could be used to create large, anatomically shaped cartilage replacements in the shape of a human hip. He also collaborated with Wolfgang Liedtke to develop a prototype of TRPV4 blockers. Guilak later received the 2010 Borelli Award from the American Society of Biomechanics for his work in the biomechanics of health, degeneration, and repair of the synovial joint.

While working as the Laszlo Ormandy Professor of Orthopaedic Surgery and Professor of Biomedical Engineering, Guilak was the recipient of the 2012 Dean's Award for his "intelligence, patience, and compassion." In this role, Guilak's laboratory used mice to demonstrate the ability to produce an unlimited number of stem cells that could turn into cartilage. As a result of his research, he was named the inaugural winner of the Biomedical Engineering Society's Innovator Award for Cell and Molecular Bioengineering in 2014. The following year, Guilak earned his second Kappa Delta award for his study of post-traumatic arthritis and the development of therapeutic approaches that target inflammation following injury.

=== WUSTL ===
In 2016, Guilak left Duke to join the faculty at Washington University in St. Louis (WUSTL) as co-director of the new Center of Regenerative Medicine and director of research at Shriners Hospitals for Children. In this role, he developed new methods for growing cartilage and bone from stem cells as path to treating arthritis. At WUSTL, Guilak was also appointed to the rank of professor of orthopedic surgery in the School of Medicine. During his first year teaching at the institution, Guilak continued to focus on the biomechanical factors that contribute to the onset and progression of osteoarthritis. As such, he received the 2016 Basic Science Research Award from the Osteoarthritis Research Society International. Later, Guilak was recognized by the Tissue Engineering and Regenerative Medicine Society for his "significant contributions to the tissue engineering and regenerative medicine field."

Guilak has made pioneering advances in the field of "smart cells", creating living implants that serve as self-regulating pharmacologic factories for the body. He is credited for creating two new scientific fields, "mechanogenetics" and "chronogenetics". Mechanogenetics involves using cellular mechanotransduction pathways to synthesize biological drugs on demand, while chronogentics uses the cell's own molecular circadian clock to drive drug delivery in a timed manner.

Due to the COVID-19 pandemic, Guilak's laboratory was forced to pause their experiments on the causes of arthritis and potential treatments. Despite this, Guilak received his third Kappa Delta Award for his research in functional cartilage engineering for total joint resurfacing. The Kappa Delta Award, often termed the "Nobel Prize of Orthopaedics", is considered the highest research award in the field of orthopedics. Guilak is the only person to have received this award 3 times.

In February 2022, Guilak was elected a member of the National Academy of Engineering "for contributions to regenerative medicine and mechanobiology and their application to the development of clinical therapies." Guilak also received his 5th mentoring award, the 2022 Outstanding Achievement in Mentoring Award from the Orthopaedic Research Society.

In October 2022, Guilak was also elected a member of the National Academy of Medicine "for contributions to the understanding of musculoskeletal diseases such as arthritis, and the development of new disease therapies through the creation of multiple novel fields of biomedical engineering, including functional tissue engineering, mechanogenetics, and synthetic chronogenetics."

In December 2022, Guilak was elected a member of the National Academy of Inventors for his contributions to entrepreneurship and inventions on the development of new drug, cell, and gene therapies for arthritis.

He is also a Fellow of the Academy of Science, St. Louis.

=== Arts ===
In 2008, Guilak's 3D weaving system was exhibited in the Museum of Modern Art (MoMA) as part of a display on "Design and the Elastic Mind", an arts exhibit by Paola Antonelli, seeking to "highlight examples of successful translation of disruptive innovation, examples based on ongoing research, as well as reflections on the future responsibilities of design. Of particular interest will be the exploration of the relationship between design and science and the approach to scale."

Guilak is currently part of a scientific team working with artist Diemut Strebe on the project "Sugababe", a living replica of Vincent van Gogh's ear involving as main technologies tissue engineering, genetic engineering and cell reprogramming.

=== Sports ===
Guilak is an accomplished racquetball player and has played on the professional circuit in the International Racquetball Tour (IRT) for several years, reaching the top 60 in the world in 2016. He was sponsored as a player and coach by Prince Sports-Ektelon racquet sports for decades. He served as the coach of the Duke University racquetball team from 2008 to 2016. In 2023, he won the national doubles championship title (40+) at the National Masters Racquetball Association tournament.
