= Bosworth Tennis =

Bosworth International

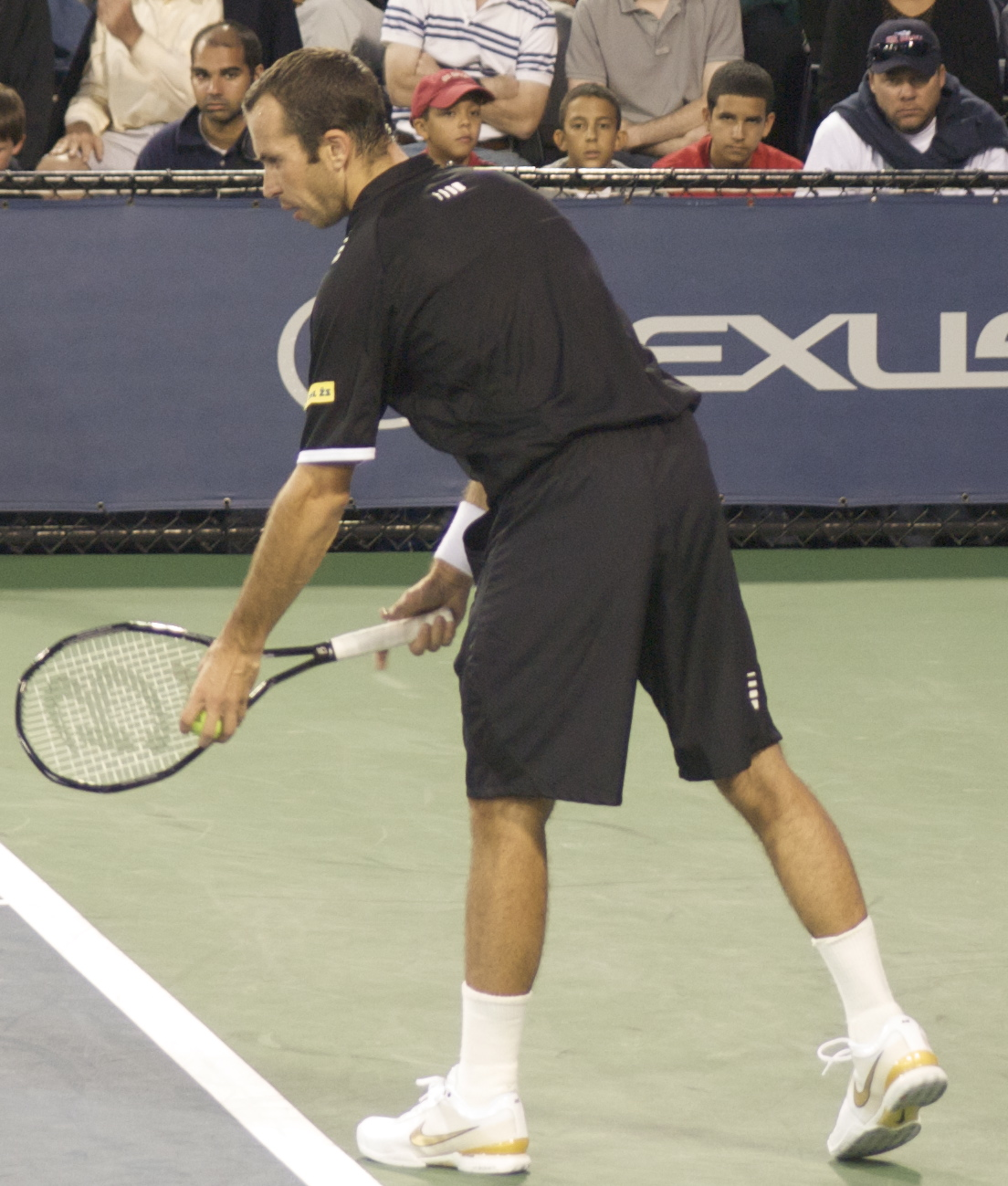
Radek Štěpánek at the 2009 US Open with a Bosworth ten-sided racket

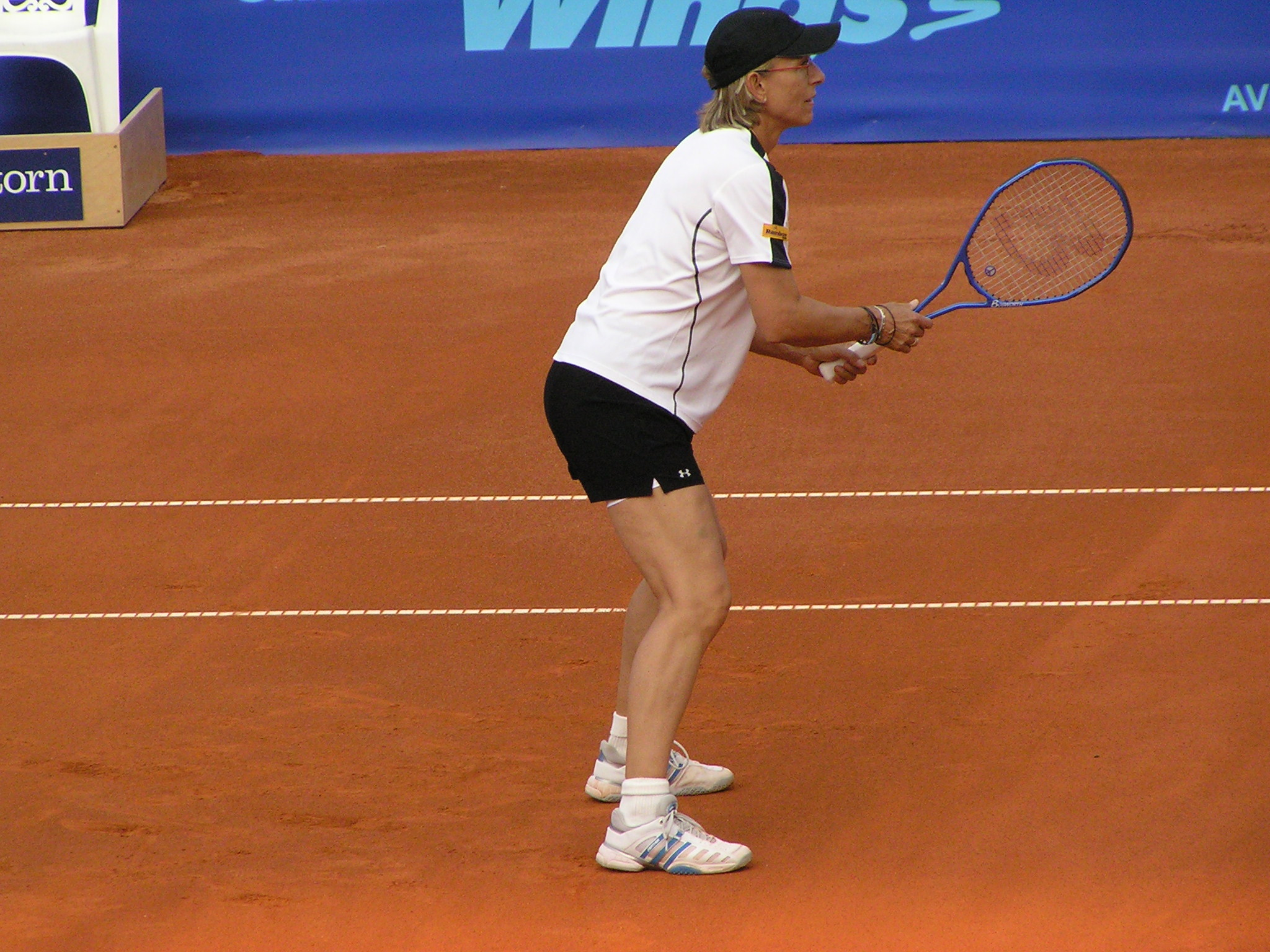
Martina Navratilova at the 2006 Prague Open with a Bosworth racket

Bosworth Tennis, also known as Bosworth International, is a family business which specializes in stringing tennis rackets but also designs and alters other aspects of tennis rackets to match the personal preferences of the players. They have worked with many of the top tennis players, notably Ivan Lendl. The company was created by Warren Bosworth in 1975. By 1992 his business moved from Glastonbury, Connecticut, to Boca Raton. It is now led by his son Jay Bosworth, who joined the company in 1982. It is one of a handful of highly specialized companies catering to the top professional players, compabarable to Roman Prokes (Maria Sharapova, Andy Roddick) and Nate Ferguson (Roger Federer, Novak Djokovic), but they also provide similar services to amateur players.

Warren M. Bosworth Jr. (January 5, 1935 – July 7, 2010) was born in Providence, Rhode Island. After his studies of embalmment at the New England Institute of Anatomy, Warren Bosworth had many jobs, including embalmer at his father's Warren M. Bosworth Funeral Home, and investment banker, before starting around 1970 a company that maintained tennis court surfaces. He married Barbara Bedard in 1959. They lived with their three children in Hartford, Connecticut.

After he had bought and adapted a stringing machine in 1972, he was asked to redesign the stringing machine at Ektelon Corp. He started working for the Aetna World Cup tournament in Hartford, and by 1976 became the Floor General there, responsible for the stringing, the grounds and the ball courts. In 1975, he was so well known as a stringer and qualified pro trainer that he retired from the investment banking and became a full-time stringer, touring the circuit with his Bosworth Racket Clinic. Most famous collaboration is the one with Lendl. Roscoe Tanner claims his streak at the US Open in 79 (including wins against Lendl and Borg) was caused by Bosworth adjusting his rackets. Working with many of the top professional players, he was nicknamed "The Wizard of Boz" and "The Doctor".

He also worked as chief technical consultant for Snauwaert. In 1980, he designed his first full racket, the Snauwaert Dyno. His second design was a racket for Jimmy Connors. Warren Bosworth also invented new stringing patterns like the Bosworth Pattern, perfect squares surrounded by rectangles.

== Notable players ==
- Andre Agassi
- Kevin Anderson
- Jimmy Arias
- Tracy Austin
- Boris Becker
- Jimmy Connors
- Steve Denton
- Vitas Gerulaitis
- Brian Gottfried
- Tim Gullikson
- Rodney Harmon
- Rod Laver
- Ivan Lendl
- Sandy Mayer
- Andy Murray
- Martina Navratilova
- John Newcombe
- Barbara Potter
- Ken Rosewall
- Pete Sampras
- Bill Scanlon
- Monica Seles
- Stan Smith
- Harold Solomon
- Roscoe Tanner
