= Grandview Heights High School =

Public school in Grandview Heights, Ohio, United States

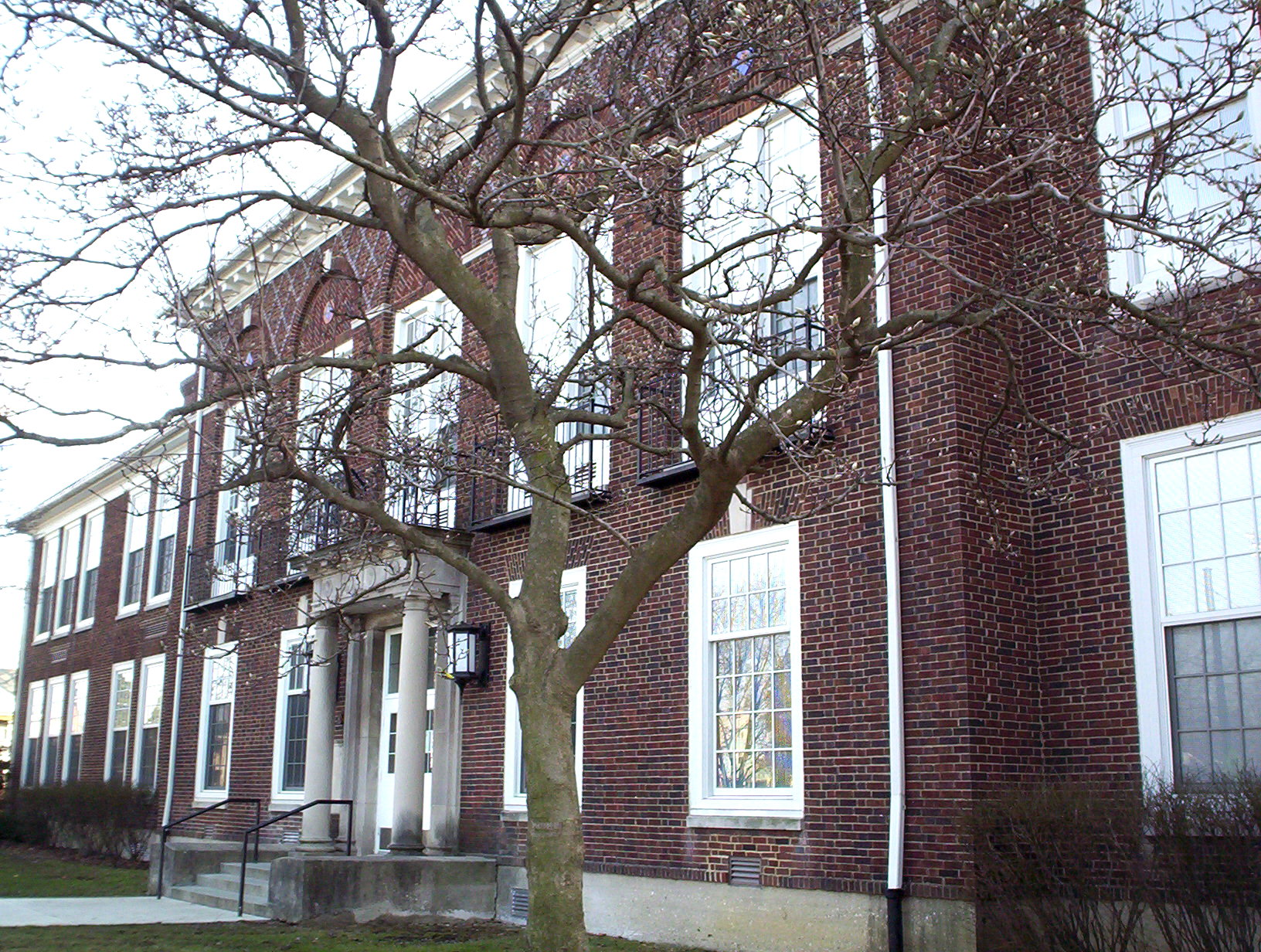
- The front of Grandview Heights High School

Location
- 1587 West Third Avenue; Grandview Heights, (Franklin County), Ohio 43212; United States; 39°59′5″N 83°2′54″W

Information
- Type: Public, Coeducational high school
- Established: 1922
- Status: Open
- School district: Grandview Heights City Schools
- Authority: The State of Ohio
- Superintendent: Andy Culp
- Principal: Samuel Belk
- Teaching staff: 26.00 (FTE)
- Grades: 9-12
- Average class size: Avg. Grad. Class: 96.5 Class Size: 13.9
- Student to teacher ratio: 12.73
- Colors: Navy and white
- Song: The Long Day Closes
- Fight song: Loyalty
- Athletics conference: Mid-State League
- Sports: https://ghathletics.org/
- Mascot: Bobcat
- Team name: Bobcats
- Rivals: West Jefferson, Bexley
- Newspaper: The Word
- Yearbook: The Highlander
- Website: ghschools.org

Grandview Heights High School is a public high school in Grandview Heights, Ohio, a suburb of Columbus. It is the only high school in the Grandview Heights City Schools district, which serves both the city of Grandview Heights and the village of Marble Cliff.

In 2021, the boys varsity soccer team won the Ohio High School Athletic Association (OHSAA) Division 3 State Championship, the first in the school's history. They won again in 2022.

In 2022, the Grandview Heights High School Model United Nations team received an Award of Distinction (highest honor) for Research and Preparation, and an Award of Merit (third-highest honor) for Committee Participation at NHSMUN. Four members of the nine person team were invited to be plenary speakers at the closing ceremony of around 2,500 students, advisors, and directors. The team was recognized by the Office of the Governor of Ohio and the Ohio House of Representatives for their achievements.

== Notable alumni ==
- Ralph Guglielmi (class of 1951), former quarterback for the Washington Redskins, St. Louis Cardinals, New York Giants, and Philadelphia Eagles, played college football for the Notre Dame Fighting Irish
- Tad Weed (class of 1951), former kicker for the Pittsburgh Steelers, played college football for the Ohio State Buckeyes
- John Hoberg, screenwriter
- Luke Lachey (class of 2020), tight-end for the Houston Texans
