= Racket (sports equipment) =

Sports penar used to strikkddje ball or shuttlecock

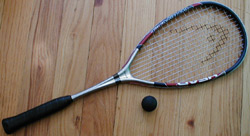
Squash racket and ball

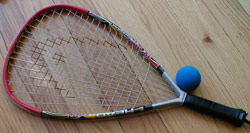
Racquetball racket and ball

A racket or racquet is an item of sporting equipment used to strike a ball or shuttlecock in a variety of sports. A racket consists of three major components: a widened distal end known as the head, an elongated handle known as the grip, and a reinforced connection between the head and handle known as the throat or heart. The head of the racket forms a flattened firm surface, known as the face, which is used to strike the ball or shuttlecock.

In the strictest sense, the word "racket" specifically refers to a striking implement with a mesh face made of interlaced, tightly stretched strings fixed on an ovoid frame known as the rim. This type of racket is used in sports such as tennis, badminton, and racquetball. Some rackets have a rigid one-piece head with a solid or fenestrated face instead of a meshwork of strings. Implements with a solid or perforated face are generally called paddles or bats. They are used in sports such as table tennis, pickleball and padel. Sports using rackets or paddles are collectively known as racket sports.[citation needed]

Racket design, materials and manufacturing has changed considerably over the centuries. The frame of rackets for all sports was traditionally made of solid wood (later laminated wood) and the strings of animal intestine known as catgut. The traditional racket size was limited by the strength and weight of the wooden frame which had to be strong enough to hold the strings and stiff enough to hit the ball or shuttle. Manufacturers started adding non-wood laminates to wood rackets to improve stiffness. Non-wood rackets were made first of steel, then of aluminium, and then carbon fiber composites. Wood is still used for real tennis, rackets, and xare. Most rackets are now made of composite materials including carbon fiber or fiberglass, metals such as titanium alloys, or ceramics.

Catgut has been partially replaced by synthetic materials including nylon, polyamide, and other polymers. Rackets are restrung when necessary, which may be after every match for a professional. Despite the name, "catgut" has never been made from any part of a cat.

== Spelling ==
Racket is the standard American spelling of the word. Racquet is an alternative spelling more common in Britain, as evidenced by the BBC style guide. Racquet is used more commonly in certain sports, such as tennis, squash, racquetball, and badminton, and less commonly in others. However, the International Tennis Federation uses racket. Racquet appeared in the 19th century as a French-influenced variant of racket.

== Etymology ==
The origin of the term "racket" is unclear. It may be derived from the Flemish word "raketsen" which is itself derived from Middle French "rachasser", meaning "to strike (the ball) back".

== Badminton ==
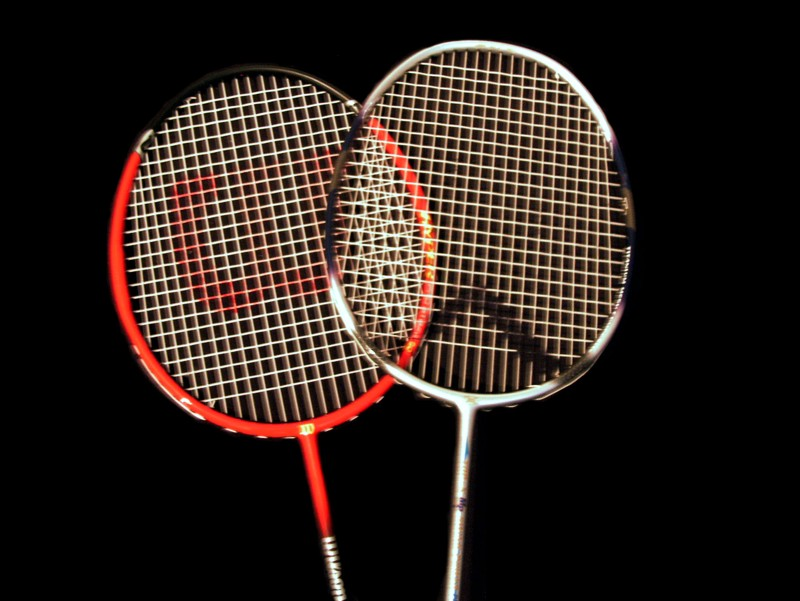
Badminton rackets

Badminton rackets are light, with top quality rackets weighing between about 70 and 95 grams. Modern rackets are composed of carbon fiber composite (graphite reinforced plastic), which may be augmented by a variety of materials. Carbon fiber has an excellent strength to weight ratio, is stiff, and gives excellent kinetic energy transfer. Before the adoption of carbon fiber composite, rackets were made of wood to their excessive weight and cost.

There is a wide variety of racket designs, although the badminton racket size and shape are limited by the laws of the game. Different rackets have playing characteristics that appeal to different players. The traditional oval head shape is still available, but an isometric head shape is increasingly common in new rackets. Various companies have emerged but Yonex of Japan, Victor of Taiwan, China and Li-Ning of China are the dominant players in the market. The majority of top tournaments are sponsored by these companies. Every year new technology is introduced by these companies but predominantly, all rackets are made of carbon graphite composite.

== Rackets or Racquets ==
This sport, which is the predecessor to the modern game of squash, rackets, is played with 30 1/2-inch (770 mm) wooden rackets. While squash equipment has evolved in the intervening century, rackets equipment has changed little.

== Racquetball ==
According to the current racquetball rules there are no limitations on the weight of a racquetball racket.

1. The racket, including bumper guard and all solid parts of the handle, may not exceed 22 inches in length.
2. The racket frame may be any material judged safe.
3. The racket frame must include a cord that must be securely attached to the player's wrist.
4. The string of the racket must be gut, monofilament, nylon, graphite, plastic, metal, or a combination thereof, and must not mark or deface the ball.
5. Using an illegal racket will result in forfeiture of the game in progress or, if discovered between games, forfeiture of the preceding game.

Racquetball rackets, unlike many other types, generally have little or no neck, the grip connecting directly to the head. They also tend to have head shapes that are notably wider at the top, with some older rackets looking almost triangular or teardrop shaped.

== Real tennis ==
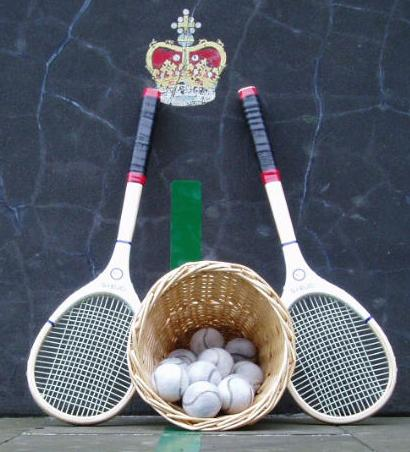
Real tennis rackets and balls

In real tennis, also called court tennis, 27-inch (686-mm) long rackets are made of wood and very tight strings to cope with the game's heavy balls. The racket heads are bent slightly to make striking balls close to the floor or in corners easier.

== Squash ==
Standard squash rackets are governed by the rules of the game. Traditionally they were made of laminated timber (typically Ash), with a small strung area using natural gut strings. After a rule change in the mid-1980s, they are now almost always made of composite materials such as carbon fiber or metals (graphite, Kevlar, titanium, and/or boron) with synthetic strings. Modern rackets are 70 cm long, with a maximum strung area of 500 square centimetres (approximately 75 square inches) and a mass between 90 and 200 grams (4–7 ounces).

== Table tennis ==
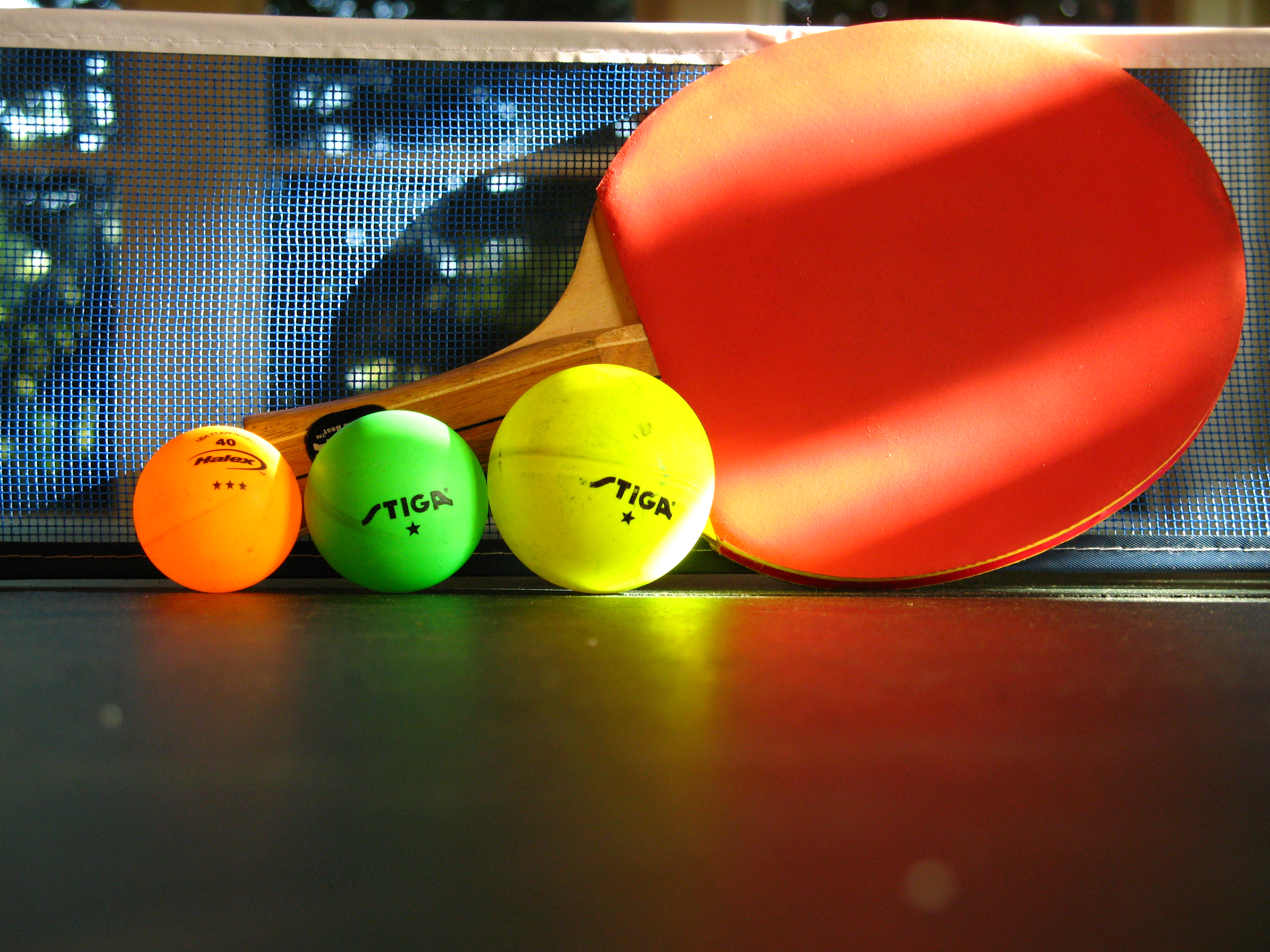
Table Tennis racket with 3 different sizes of the celluloid ball

Table tennis uses a table tennis racket made from laminated wood covered with rubber on one or two sides depending on the grip of the player. Unlike a conventional racket, it does not contain strings strung across an open frame. This is called either a paddle, racket, or a bat, with usage differing by region. In the USA the term "paddle" is common, in Europe the term is "bat", and the official ITTF term is "racket."

Table Tennis racket specs are defined at the ITTF handbook section 2.04 and currently include the following.

| 2.04.01 | The racket may be of any size, shape or weight but the blade shall be flat and rigid. |
| 2.04.02 | At least 85% of the blade by thickness shall be of natural wood; an adhesive layer within the blade may be reinforced with fibrous material such as carbon fibre, glass fibre or compressed paper, but shall not be thicker than 7.5% of the total thickness or 0.35mm, whichever is the smaller. |
| 2.04.03 | A side of the blade used for striking the ball shall be covered with either ordinary pimpled rubber, with pimples outwards having a total thickness including adhesive of not more than 2.0mm, or sandwich rubber, with pimples inwards or outwards, having a total thickness including adhesive of not more than 4.0mm. |
| 2.04.03.01 | Ordinary pimpled rubber is a single layer of non-cellular rubber, natural or synthetic, with pimples evenly distributed over its surface at a density of not less than 10 per cm^{2} and not more than 30 per cm^{2}. |
| 2.04.03.02 | Sandwich rubber is a single layer of cellular rubber covered with a single outer layer of ordinary pimpled rubber, the thickness of the pimpled rubber not being more than 2.0mm. |
| 2.04.04 | The covering material shall extend up to but not beyond the limits of the blade, except that the part nearest the handle and gripped by the fingers may be left uncovered or covered with any material. |
| 2.04.05 | The blade, any layer within the blade and any layer of covering material or adhesive on a side used for striking the ball shall be continuous and of even thickness. |
| 2.04.06 | The surface of the covering material on a side of the blade, or of a side of the blade if it is left uncovered, shall be matt, bright red on one side and black on the other. |
| 2.04.07 | The racket covering shall be used without any physical, chemical or other treatment. |
| 2.04.07.01 | Slight deviations from continuity of surface or uniformity of colour due to accidental damage or wear may be allowed provided that they do not significantly change the characteristics of the surface. |
| 2.04.08 | Before the start of a match and whenever he or she changes his or her racket during a match a player shall show his or her opponent and the umpire the racket he or she is about to use and shall allow them to examine it. |

== Tennis ==
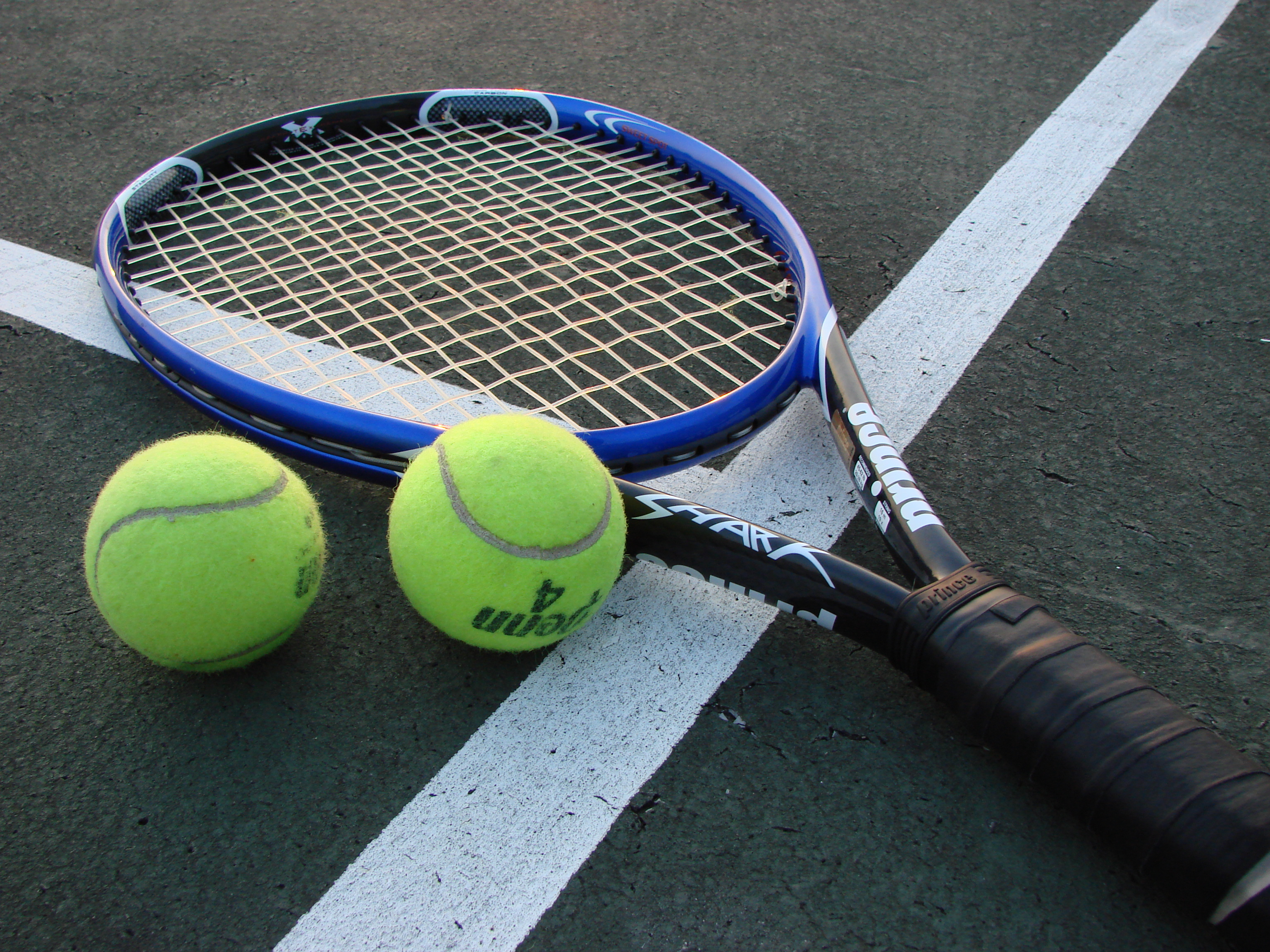
A modern tennis racket, with carbon fiber-reinforced polymer frame

Popular lawn tennis rackets vary primarily in length, weight, balance point, stiffness, beam thickness, string pattern, string density, and head size. They generally conform to unofficial standards that differ from past rackets. Currently, almost all adult rackets are made from a graphite composite. Those made from wood (the original racket frame row material), steel, fiberglass, or aluminium are considered obsolete, although those materials are technically legal for play. Inexpensive rackets often have poor performance characteristics such as excessive flexibility and inadequate weight. No recent manufacturers use single-throated beams, although Prince tried to reintroduce the single throat design in the 1990s: the only professional who used one was Mirjana Lučić. Braided graphite rackets were considered high-end until recently and molded rackets have been the norm for some time. Molding is less expensive to manufacture and offer high stiffness. Graphite-composite rackets are today's industry standard in professional tennis.

For length, 53 to 66 centimetres (21 to 26 inches) is normally the junior racket range, while 69 cm (27 in) is for stronger more physically mature players. Some are also available at lengths of 70 to 74 cm (27 1/2 to 29 in). The Gamma Big Bubba was produced with an 81 cm (32 in) length but it is no longer legal in that length. Gamma responded by changing the length of the grip portion of the racket, to continue sales. The length restriction was based on the concern that such long rackets would make the serve too dominant, but that concern has never been objectively supported with testing. Moreover, some players, such as John Isner, are much taller and have longer arms than average professionals (and especially low stature ones), giving them a much larger advantage in terms of height for the service than is possible with several inches of racket length. This makes the length restriction more questionable. Finally, the professionals who nearly always choose to use the longest rackets typically choose them because they use two-handed groundstrokes for both forehand and backhand, using the extra length to improve their reach. An example is Marion Bartoli. As this type of player is not dominant in the sport, or even close to being average in terms of per capita representation, the length restriction seems even more unnecessary. Despite Prince's attempt to market longer length "longbody" rackets in the 1990s, standard length remains the overwhelming choice of players, further negating the argument in favor of the length restriction. When most players who choose to use a longer racket than 69 cm (27 in) choose one, they typically only use a 70 cm (27 1/2 in) model, rather than one approaching 76 cm (30 in). Longer rackets were introduced by Dunlop.

The weights of a racket ranges between 200 g (7 oz) unstrung and 360 g (12.6 oz) strung. Until the 1980s, rackets weighted at "medium" were produced. "Heavy" rackets were produced during the height of the wood era (e.g. the 1960s), very sparingly. The "medium" weight is heavier than any of the rackets produced since it was discontinued by companies. Many professionals added weight to their rackets to improve stability. Many continue to do so. Pete Sampras added lead tape to make his racket have a 400 g (14 oz) weight and Venus Williams is known for using a frame modified to be quite heavy, in terms of the recent times average. By contrast, Andy Roddick surprised many when he said he used a stock Pro Drive series model, series of racket which was light when compared with the rackets used by most top professionals. In both recreational and professional tennis, the trend has been away from heavy rackets and toward lighter rackets, despite the drawbacks from light rackets, such as increased twisting. Lawn tennis rackets originally flared outward at the bottom of the handle to prevent slippage. The rounded bottom was called a bark bottom after its inventor Matthew Barker. But by 1947, this style became superfluous. More mass gives rackets "plow through", momentum that continues once the player has managed to get the racket into motion and which is more resistant to stoppage from the ball's momentum. This can give the perception that the racket produces shots with more power, although this is complicated by the typically slower stroke production. Higher mass typically involves a slower swing but more energy to execute the swing. More mass also provides more cushioning against ball impact shock, a source of injuries such as tennis elbow. However, high racket mass can cause fatigue in the shoulder area. Typically, it is safer for the body to have higher mass. More mass, additionally, provides more stability. It makes the racket more resistant to twisting forces and pushback. The drawbacks are that heavier rackets have lower maneuverability (reducing reaction time) and require more energy to move. As a racket gets heavier, the player finds it increasingly difficult to do fast reaction shots such as quick volleys and returns of serve. However, the additional mass can help with return of serve, in particular, by making the racket much more resistant to twist from a high-powered service. Light rackets have the additional drawback of making it easier for beginning players to use inappropriate wrist-dominant strokes, which often leads to injury. This is because poor stroke mechanics can be much easier to produce with a lightweight racket, such as in using one's wrist to mostly swing the racket. An extremely typical mistake beginning players make is to choke up heavily on the racket (to try to compensate for twist from a light racket, as well as too high racket angle upon impact) and use the wrist too much. The only professional well-known player to have had success with a strongly choked-up grip is Zina Garrison.

Head size plays a very key role in a racket's performance characteristics. A larger head size very generally means more power and a larger "sweet spot". This is an area in the string bed that is partially more forgiving on off-center hits and which produces more ball-reflective power from string deformation, known as the trampoline effect. However, large head sizes can increase twisting, which makes off-center hits more difficult to control and can reduce a player's overall power production due to the playing compensating for the extra inherent power, typically with stiffer strings to reduce the increased string deformation of large heads. A smaller head size generally offers more control for many shots, particularly the service and groundstrokes aimed near the lines, but can lead to more shanks (wild misses, from hitting the frame or missing the sweet spot). This drawback is most common for professional players using single-handed topspin backhands, as well as for recreational and aged players at net. Shanking due to small racket head size is typically exacerbated by racket weight, which slows the reaction time, as well as, to a lesser degree, the racket's balance point. In professional tennis, currently-used racket head sizes vary between 610–740 cm^{2} (95–115 sq in), with most players adopting one from 630–700 cm^{2} (98–108 sq in). Rackets with smaller and larger head sizes, 550 and 770–880 cm^{2} (85 and 120–137 sq in), are still produced but are not used by professionals currently. A very small number of professionals, such as Monica Seles, used 810 cm^{2} (125 sq in) rackets during some point in their careers. Rackets with smaller heads than 550 cm^{2} (85 sq in) have not been in production since the 1980s and rackets with larger head sizes than 880 cm^{2} (137 sq in) are not currently legal for the sport, even though only elderly players typically choose to use rackets beyond 740 cm^{2} (115 sq in) and it is nearly unheard-of for a serious player who is not elderly to choose a racket over 810 cm^{2} (125 sq in). The WEED company, founded by Tad Weed, specializes in producing very large rackets, primarily for the elderly market. Rackets that are moderately higher in power production, moderately lower in weight, moderately larger in size, and which typically possess a slightly head-heavy balance are often called "tweener rackets." Rackets that have the smallest heads in current use, the highest weights in current use, and headlight or even balance are referred to as "players' rackets". Oversize rackets, typically 710 cm^{2} (110 sq in) in size, were once pejoratively referred to as "granny sticks" but resistance to them being seen as illegitimate rackets for younger players decreased dramatically with the successful use of these rackets by a small number professionals such as Andre Agassi and Pam Shriver. Originally, even midsize frames (550 cm^{2} (85 sq in)) were considered jumbo, and some top players, such as Martina Navratilova and Rod Laver said they should be banned for making the sport too easy. Later, these same professionals, including John McEnroe, signed a letter supporting a switch back to wood frames, or a limitation to the original standard size of approximately 420 cm^{2} (65 sq in). Perhaps the last professional to use a standard-size racket in professional tennis was Aaron Krickstein, known for the strongly-contested match against Connors at the 1991 US Open. He used a Wilson Ultra-II standard-size graphite racket also used in the 1980s by the hard-hitting teen Andrea Jaeger. The first oversize, the fiberglass Bentley Fortissimo from Germany, was praised by racket designers but was considered too large to be taken seriously by the small number of players who were exposed to it.

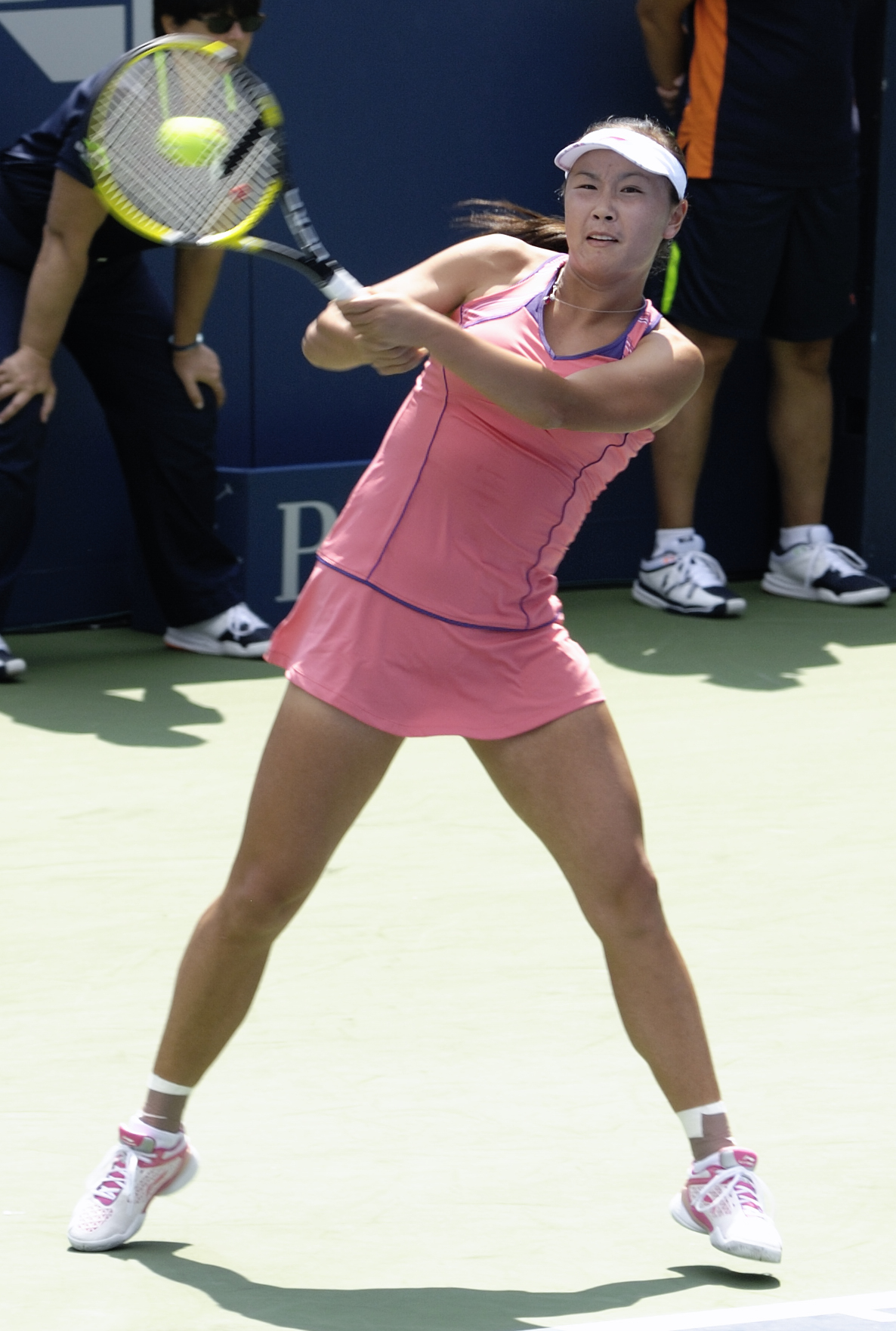
One of the ways a tennis racket can be held

The head-light balance point is rarer in professional tennis than it once was, as the sport has converted to larger-headed rackets, stiffer rackets, stiffer strings, more western grips and accompanying stroke production, and more topspin. The head-light balance point is most optimal for the serve and volley style with a continental grip. Serve and volley is no longer a viable option for nearly all professionals as the mode of playing for most points in a match. Head-heavy rackets became popular, mainly with recreational players, primarily with the introduction of the Wilson ProFile widebody racket. The head-light balance makes volleys and serves easier to produce, while groundstrokes are less stable. The head-heavy balance makes groundstrokes more stable, which typically increases the player's comfort for swinging harder to add power, but makes serves and volleys more cumbersome. A head-heavy balance also puts more stress on the elbow and shoulder.

Vibration dampeners (also sometimes known as "gummies") may be interlaced in the proximal part of the string array, to reduce the percussive sound of the ball hitting the strings and/or to reduce perceived vibration. They do not, however, reduce impact shock significantly, so they are of no safety value. Some professionals, such as Andre Agassi, used rubber bands instead of specialized dampeners. Dampeners come in two main types. The first uses the two central main strings to hold it in place. The second is sometimes called a "worm" and it is woven between many of the main strings. Dampeners are nearly always placed very near the bottom of the racket string bed.

As rackets have become lighter, stiffer, and larger-headed, the professional game has moved, basically completely, from softer and more flexible string materials to stiff materials. This is, in large part, to tone down the additional power potential of the "modern" rackets. However, it also is related to the tendency for different string materials to move out of place when subjected to heavy topspin strokes. Polyester is the string of choice today because of that resistance, despite its increased stiffness (harsher feel and more aggravating for the joints) and reduced tension-holding ability (versus a string like natural gut, which excels at that). The top professionals of the 1970s and earlier, despite having access to stiffer materials such as nylon, nearly always chose to use the very flexible natural gut instead. String bed stiffness can be increased by using stiffer materials, such as kevlar and polyester, by increasing the density of the string pattern, and by stringing with a higher tension. Racket makers and players have experimented with very dense string patterns and very "open" patterns, beginning with the Snauwaert Hi Ten, which had a pattern with as few as 12 mains and 13 crosses. Doubles great Mark Woodforde used one of them. More recently, Grigor Dimitrov is known for having played with a very open-patterned racket during part of his career. String choice, both in thickness and material, string tension, string pattern, and string pattern density can have a very large effect on how a racket performs.

Throughout most of lawn tennis' history, most rackets were made of laminated wood, with heads of around 420 cm^{2} (65 sq in). A small number of them were made of metal, such as a 1920s racket by Dayton. Some, rarely, also had metal strings. In the late 1960s, Wilson popularized the T-2000 steel racket with wire wound around the frame to make string loops, after having purchased the design from René Lacoste, who produced the racket first in a more limited run. It was popularized by the top American player Jimmy Connors and was also, prior to Connors using it, by Billie Jean King in her early career. Many players said it lacked control but had more power, when compared with wood frames of the period. Connors used the rarer "firm" model that had additional throat welds to increase its stiffness. In 1968 Spalding launched an aluminium racket, called The Smasher. Aluminium, though lighter and more flexible than steel, was sometimes less accurate than wood. The biggest complaint, however, was that metal rackets caused strong cases of tennis elbow, especially the kind that had holes for the strings directly in the frame, rather than using an external wire wrapper, as in the T-2000. Because of that drawback in particular, most of the top players still preferred to use wooden frames.

By 1975, aluminium construction improvements allowed for the introduction of the first American "oversized" racket, which was manufactured by Weed. Prince popularized the oversize racket, which had a head size of approximately 710 cm^{2} (110 sq in). Howard Head was able to obtain a broad patent for Prince, despite the prior art of the Bentley Fortissimo (the first oversize, made in Germany of fiberglass) and the Weed. The patent was rejected by Germany but approved in the USA. The popularity of the Prince aluminium oversize had the side effect of popularizing rackets having other non-standard head sizes such as mid-size 550–580 cm^{2} (85–90 sq in) and mid-plus sizes 610–630 cm^{2} (95–98 sq in). Fairly quickly, midsize frames began to become the most-used frames in the pro tours. Martina Navratilova popularized the midsize graphite racket, with her wins using the Yonex R-7, the first midsize graphite racket made by Yonex. Nearly at the same time, however, she said the "jumbo" rackets (midsize included) should be removed from the sport for making it easier. She said she would use them only because other players could, as they were tournament-legal. Fewer players chose to use oversize rackets, and some switched to midplus frames after their earliest career for more control. Fiberglass frames also had a brief period of limited popularity, making fewer inroads among top players than aluminium. Also, the earliest composites, such as the Head Competition series, used by Arthur Ashe, were made without graphite. These were more flexible than a typical early graphite composite but stiffer than wood, fiberglass, and aluminium.

In the early 1980s, "graphite" (carbon fibre) composites were introduced, and other materials were added to the composite, including ceramics, glass fibre, boron, and titanium. Some of the earliest models typically had 20% or more fiberglass, to make them more flexible. Stiff rackets were typically not preferred by most players because of their familiarity with the comfortable softness of wood. These early models tended to be very flexible and not very powerful, although they were a power upgrade over wood and metal rackets. Wilson created the Jack Kramer Pro Staff, the graphite version of the wood racket of the same name extremely popular in the late 70s and early 80s. This was the origin of the extremely influential Wilson Pro Staff 85. Chris Evert's first graphite racket was this Jack Kramer version, which had 20% fiberglass. It was not a market success and she, along with everyone else, quickly replaced it with the stiffer Pro Staff 85, which had 20% kevlar. It used the same mold and had the same braided graphite, but offered a very noticeable improvement in power. The very popular Prince original graphite, an oversize in its most popular form, was also quite influential and used by many pros, especially as juniors. Jennifer Capriati and Monica Seles, for instance, used the Prince graphite to contest their influential Wimbledon match in 1991 that has often been hailed as the beginning of the power baselining game in the WTA, although that claim is somewhat hyperbolic and is, in large part, due to the mistaken impression that the players were hitting much harder when, in fact, the rackets were more powerful. However, the very large head size, when compared with the midsize and, especially, the old "standard" size, made it easier to produce power. The racket also had an open string pattern. The Prince "original" graphite name is rather a misnomer, as it went through some significant design adjustments over its lifetime. For instance, the truly original model had a reverse teardrop head shape, something no subsequent versions had. Stiffer composite rackets, when compared with the first and second generations of graphite composites, are the contemporary standard. The last wooden racket used at Wimbledon appeared in 1987, long after they were abandoned by practically all professionals. Borg tried to stage a comeback with his standard wood racket, after his premature retirement, but it quickly ended in failure, as the standard wood was no match when placed against a stiff midplus graphite. It is also commonly argued that Chris Evert would have been able to beat Martina Navratilova during the latter's most dominant period if she had switched from her wood racket years sooner. Additionally, the last influential wooden racket, the Prince Woodie, had layers of graphite to increase its stiffness and was an oversize. It was used by Tommy Haas, Gabriela Sabatini, and quite a few others. It offered very little power but did offer much more surface area than a standard-size wooden frame. Sabatini found it helpful, as compared with smaller rackets, due to her production of heavy topspin. The only woman to beat Martina Navratilova in 1984, Kathleen Horvath, used the Prince Woodie, one of only six losses Navratilova suffered in a three-year stretch involving 260 matches.

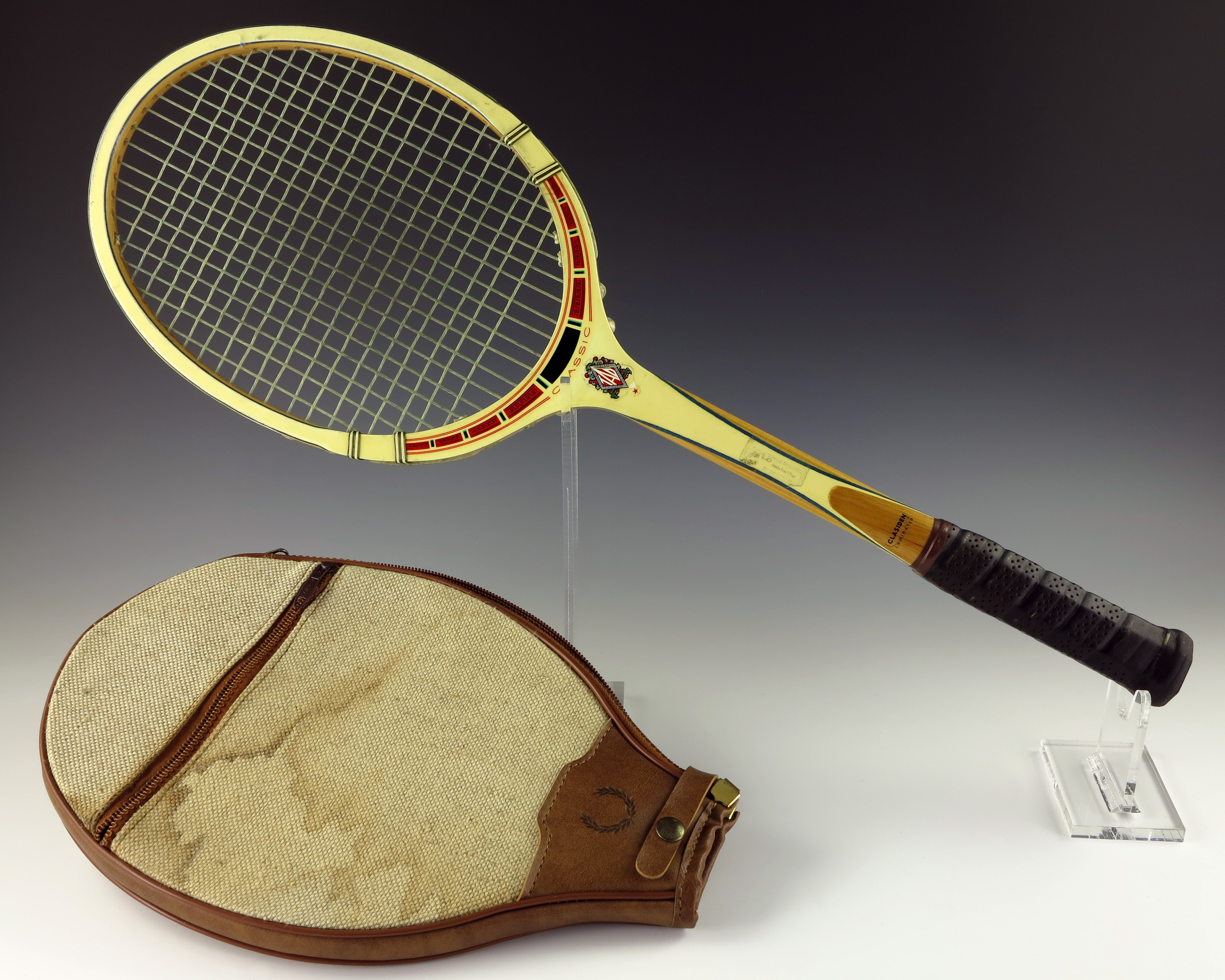
A United States tennis racket from the 1970s

A denser pattern is often considered to deliver more control, at the expense of spin potential. A more open pattern is often believed to offer greater potential for power and spin. However, how much power is produced by a player can be strongly influenced by how a player adapts to the characteristics of the racket. Some players may hit harder with a dense string pattern, producing faster shots because of the added control from the dense pattern. Rackets, including those of much of the wood era, are marked with a recommended string tension range. The basic rule is that a lower tension creates more power (from the trampoline effect) and a higher string tension creates more control (less string deformation which results in a more predictable the power and angle of the departure from the string bed.) Some professionals used small-headed rackets with flexible-material strings (natural gut) strung at very high tension. Examples include Pete Sampras and Björn Borg. Some used large-headed rackets with very inflexible-material strings (kevlar). Andre Agassi is an example. Many professionals during the standard wood era strung at relatively low tension and used natural gut string; both decisions were to increase the trampoline effect for more power. By contrast, almost every professional player today uses the much stiffer polyester string in their much stiffer rackets which also have larger heads and which tend to be lighter. Madeline Hauptman sold a line of rackets, called the MAD RAQ, which featured a Star of David pattern (a six-pointed figure consisting of two interlaced equilateral triangles), as it used three strings instead of two for stringing the racket. This pattern is used in snowshoes. This stringing pattern was said to feature less string notching, improving string lifespan. It was even claimed that many pro shops refused to carry the racket because less string breakage would reduce string and stringing service sales. It has also been claimed that the racket is more difficult to string than a two string racket. However, the Wilson T-2000-type requires a great deal more time for stringing than a typical racket and rackets of that series were very popular. Whatever the cause of the failure of the MAD RAQ in the marketplace, it was the only time a snowshoe pattern was used in tennis. Hauptman switched her racket line to a two string diamond pattern (PowerAngle). This pattern had already been used in much earlier rackets but had not had much popularity. It is said to be easier to string than the MAD RAQ but does not have the benefit of reduced string notching, at least not to the same degree. The claim is that this diagonal pattern offers more comfort than a traditional square pattern.

The stiffest graphite racket that has been sold is the Prince More Game MP, which is rated at 80 RA on the industry-standard Babolat measuring equipment. The Prince More series used two pieces (a top side and bottom side of the racket, or a left side and a right side) and no grommet strip. Prince had briefly used a design without a grommet strip in an early version of its "original" graphite oversize. The most famous user of a More series racket was Martina Navratilova, who returned to play doubles in her 40s, using a Prince More Control DB (a midplus) for her initial wins in the mixed doubles at Wimbledon and the Australian Open with Leander Paes. She had used the stiffer More Game MP prior. Navratilova later switched to a design by Warren Bosworth (the founder of Bosworth Tennis) which had a customized asymmetric grip and an unusual geometric head shape. Stiffer rackets typically offer more power and control at the expense of increased ball shock, which can lead to injury or tennis elbow aggravation. Typically, power and control are at odds. However, in the case of stiff rackets, less energy is dissipated by the racket deforming, transmitting it back to the ball. Control is improved because there is less deformation. However, a player's overall power level may decrease due to the need to moderate ball striking effort to reduce discomfort and even injury. Although known as a hard hitter in her younger years, in her 40s she was known more as a precision player who used finesse (and especially tactics) more than power. In fact, the last doubles partner she won a major with in mixed, Bob Bryan, remarked on how slow her serve was, despite how effective she was on the court. Navratilova also used string that was much softer than what anyone else on tour used (thick uncoated natural gut), to help compensate for the stiffness of her racket. The vastly higher injury rate in tennis (when compared with the wood era) is, in part, due to the increase in stiffness, both of the racket and of the strings.

Real tennis uses wooden rackets and cork-filled balls. It is a very different sport from today's lawn tennis.

== See also ==
- Tennis racket theorem
- List of racket sports
