= Bud Held =

American athlete (born 1927)

Personal information
- Born: October 25, 1927 (age 98) Los Angeles, California, U.S.
Medal record
Men's Athletics
Representing the United States
Pan American Games
Gold medal – first place	1955 Mexico City	Javelin

Franklin Wesley "Bud" Held (born October 25, 1927) is an American athlete primarily notable for his performance throwing the javelin. He was born in Los Angeles, California.

== College career ==
Held started as a pole vaulter at Grossmont High School near San Diego, where he finished in a 3-way tie for 4th place at the 1946 CIF California State Meet. He switched to the javelin while a student at Stanford University, where he won the NCAA javelin championship in 1948, 1949, and 1950. Held won the AAU USA Outdoor Track and Field Championships six times, 1949, 1951, 1953 to 55 and 1958. Held set six American records in the javelin, and in 1953 became the first American to hold the world javelin record with an effort of 263 feet 10 inches (80.42 m); in so doing, Held became the first athlete ever to throw the 800-gram (1.8 lb) javelin over 80 m (260 ft). He set a second world record of 268 feet 2 inches (81.74 m) in 1955, and his career best throw was 270 feet 0 inches (82.30 m) in 1956.

== International competition ==
Held was a member of the United States' 1952 Olympic team where he placed ninth after a shoulder injury, and missed making the 1956 Olympic team by an inch. He won a gold medal in the 1955 Pan American Games in 1955 with a throw of 69.77 meters (228.9 ft).

== Master's competition ==
Held continues to compete in masters competitions. In 1970, Held set a United States national masters javelin record of 229 ft 3 in (69.88 m). On October 4, 2008, at the Club West Masters Track meet in Santa Barbara, Held set the age 80+ World Record in the pole vault adding to the M75 World Record he already holds. He is also ranked in the discus. He also coaches his live-in partner Nadine O'Connor, who holds the women's 65+ pole vault world record, among numerous other track and field records.

== Outside of competition ==
After his retirement from standard competition, Held became a sporting equipment businessman. He founded Ektelon, inventing the world's first aluminum tennis racquet and its related stringing equipment from his San Diego garage, then subsequently the first aluminum racquetball racquet. He also invented a hollow javelin that was used into the 1960s, but his design was later outlawed due to safety concerns.

== Honors ==
Held was inducted into the USA Track & Field Hall of Fame in 1987, the USATF Masters Hall of Fame in 2005 and is a member of the Stanford Athletic Hall of Fame.
