= Bentley Fortissimo =

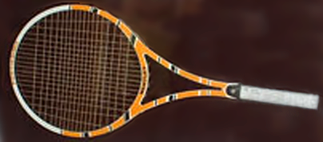
The Bentley Fortissimo tennis racquet

The Bentley Fortissimo tennis racquet of 1972 was the first oversize tennis racquet to be produced and demonstrated publicly. Prior to its introduction, all tennis racquets were much smaller in terms of the stringbed size, measured in square inches. Today, that size, known as standard, is not used by any professional player for professional match play.

The Fortissimo was shown in 1972 at the "Spoga", a sporting goods show in Germany. Its designer is Kurt Klemmer, who made the racquet with an epoxy fiberglass process. The Fortissimo was not produced on a commercial scale. Racquet engineer Siegfried Kuebler stated that it did not create a favorable impression with tennis players but was positively received by racquet designers.

The Fortissimo emerged two years prior to the filing of the influential and lucrative patent for racquets sized 95-135 square inches by Prince Sporting Goods (now Prince Sports and commonly called Prince). This resulted in the disqualification of the patent by the German patent authority. The Prince patent was upheld elsewhere and the company became the only highly-successful seller of oversize racquets in their early history. The first was the very flexible aluminum Prince Classic of 1976. Tad Weed introduced the first super-oversize in 1975, to start a line that continues to be sold today.

== Materials Shift Impact ==
Although metal racquets became popular in the 1970s, beginning with the invention of the 1963 Lacoste steel racquet that became the extremely successful Wilson T2000, synthetic materials, beginning with fiberglass and culminating in graphite, would eventually completely displace them from all but the low-budget recreational line sold in generalist stores such as Walmart.

The Yamaha Corporation saw success in the marketplace in the 1970s and early 1980s with fiberglass racquets made with the small "standard" head size such as the YFG 10. Several other companies introduced racquets made just with fiberglass as well, such as Caldon and Head. As with the Yamaha, these were made with the standard head size. The Fortissimo, however, was made with the new oversize head size, using the improved resistance to warpage (when compared with wood) and lighter weight (when compared with metal) of fiberglass. Fiberglass never achieved market dominance, though, as wood racquets with graphite layering and metal racquets, including oversize models, continued to find popularity. Graphite, which offered better stiffness and resistance to cracking than fiberglass, eventually displaced all other materials as the primary constituent material of a tennis racquet.

The change from the "standard" (the smallest) racquet head size, which was used until the 1970s by all tennis players, to larger sizes is considered to be the most dramatic in terms of tennis racquet technology change by some tennis historians. However, the materials shift from soft wood to stiffer, lighter, and more warp-resistant materials (culminating in graphite), which generally accompanied the transition to larger head sizes, also is paramount in terms of impact.

As oversize wooden racquets have a strong tendency to warp and also lack solidity when produced at a playable weight, only one was produced, the Prince Woodie, which had many layers of graphite to improve its stability. That racquet was used successfully by male and female professionals, such as Gabriela Sabatini and professionals in development, such as Tommy Haas. Although it offered very little power, when compared with a graphite racquet, due to its flexibility, it absorbed ball shock well due to its wood construction, making it an excellent racquet for training. Similarly, fiberglass was quite flexible, like wood. The desire for more power led to graphite eventually completely displacing fiberglass, although graphite racquets with approximately 20% fiberglass were produced long after 100% fiberglass racquets disappeared from the market.

== Size Shift Impact ==
No professional tennis player has used the small "standard" racquet head size since the 1980s for a professional match, with nearly all players having switched to a midsize or larger frame by 1984. However, even today, few professionals use an oversize racquet, preferring a midplus or super midplus. That size is smaller than that of an oversize (which is typically 110 square inches) and larger than that of a midsize (which is typically 90 square inches). The only active professional player to use a midsize recently is Roger Federer, who switched to a larger racquet at the end of 2013.

Oversize and larger racquets are generally used by older recreational players, as a way to reduce the impact of aging on their tennis competitiveness. The largest legal racquets, which are known as super-oversize frames, have proven extremely rare in professional competition, with only Monica Seles being a top 10 or higher ranked player who used one (a 125 square inch Yonex) during her career at any time. Andre Agassi achieved considerable success with an oversize racquet, a fact that was often noted due to his rivalry with Pete Sampras, a player who used a much smaller midsize frame. Oversize racquets are generally considered to offer more power but less control, a trend that exists from the smallest racquet size ("standard") to the largest legal size, which is 135 square inches.

== Rarity and Mind Share ==
There were twelve Fortissimo racquets produced and only two are reportedly still extant, both of which are possessed by Siegfried Kuebler, the designer notable for creating widebody racquets. Those led to the very popular and extremely influential Wilson Profile racquet of 1987. Kuebler's first widebody racquet emerged in 1984.

As few were produced and the two that were submitted to the German patent authority disappeared for many years, little is known in the tennis world about the Fortissimo. Howard Head and the company formerly known as Prince Sporting Goods (not Prince Sports) received the mind share and market success for oversize rackets in their early years. The article that appeared on the sporting goods company Tennis Warehouse's website in 2005, in which Kuebler provides the historical details regarding the Fortissimo, is now only available via one of the Internet Archive's Wayback Machine snapshots.
