= Snauwaert =

Italian sports equipment manufacturer

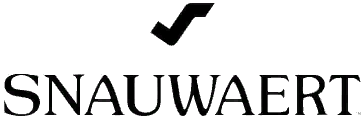
- Industry: Sports equipment
- Founded: 1928; 97 years ago
- Founder: Valler Snauwaert and Eugeen Depla in Belgium
- Headquarters: Italy
- Products: Tennis equipment
- Website: snauwaert.com

Snauwaert is an Italian sports equipment manufacturer, focused on tennis and paddle tennis, producing mainly rackets. It was founded in Beveren-Roeselare (Belgium) in 1928 by the brothers-in-law Valler Snauwaert and Eugeen Depla.

== Products ==
The Ergonom is one of the most unusual rackets ever produced, featuring a rotating head that allegedly stayed in line with the path of the ball longer than a conventional racket head.

The racket was invented, designed and patented in the 1980s by the Italian entrepreneur and tennis enthusiast Carlo Gibello, who invented the Duralift, the plastic string cross saver.

== Sponsorships ==
Famous tennis players who used Snauwaert include:

- (Australia) Evonne Goolagong Cawley
- (Czechoslovakia) Miloslav Mečíř
- (Czechoslovakia) Tomáš Šmíd
- (Sweden) Mikael Pernfors
- (United States) Vitas Gerulaitis
- (United States) Brian Gottfried
