= Tad Weed =

American football player (1933–2006)

Profile
- Position: Placekicker

Personal information
- Born: January 18, 1933; Columbus, Ohio, U.S.
- Died: November 7, 2006 (aged 73)

Career information
- College: Ohio State

Career history
- 1955: Pittsburgh Steelers

Awards and highlights
- National champion (1954)
- Stats at Pro Football Reference

Thurlow "Tad" Weed (January 18, 1933 – November 7, 2006) was the placekicker for the Ohio State Buckeyes, a college level American football team that won the national championship in 1954. Weed, 145 pounds, made 24 of 26 extra point attempts and one field goal in a 10-0 title run that included a 20-7 win over USC in the Rose Bowl.

After college, Weed spent one year in the National Football League, where he was three of six in field goal attempts and 12 of 12 in extra point attempts for the Pittsburgh Steelers. The following year, Pittsburgh selected Gary Glick out of Colorado State with the first pick of the 1956 NFL draft. Glick became the Steelers' placekicker, as well as a starting defensive back, and Weed's professional career was over.

In the early 1970s, Weed invented the WEED tennis racquet. The racquet's 135-square-inch hitting area was the largest allowed under the rules of tennis.

In later years, Weed suffered from a nerve disorder that took away the use of his legs. He died on November 7, 2006, in Columbus Riverside Hospital from a blood disorder.

Prior to attending Ohio State, Weed played for Grandview Heights High School.
