= Grandview Heights, Ohio =

- City
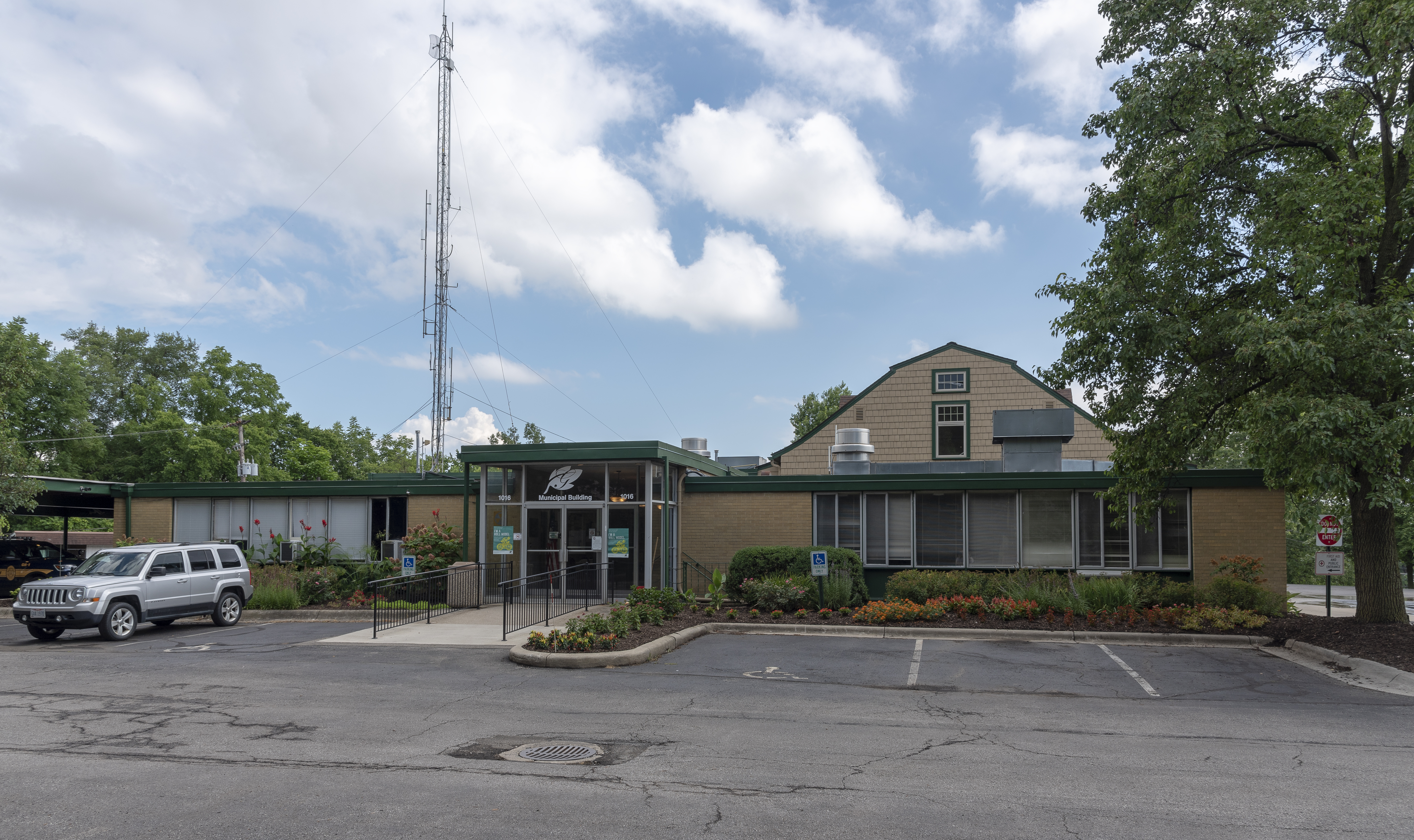
- Grandview Heights Municipal Building

- Flag
- Interactive map of Grandview Heights, Ohio
- Location within Ohio Location within the United States
- Coordinates: 39°58′46″N 83°02′26″W
- Country: United States
- State: Ohio
- County: Franklin

Area
  - Total: 1.32 sq mi (3.42 km^{2})
  - Land: 1.32 sq mi (3.41 km^{2})
  - Water: 0.0039 sq mi (0.01 km^{2})
- Elevation: 771 ft (235 m)

Population (2020)
  - Total: 8,085
  - Estimate (2023): 8,841
  - Density: 6,149.7/sq mi (2,374.43/km^{2})
- Time zone: UTC-5 (Eastern (EST))
  - Summer (DST): UTC-4 (EDT)
- ZIP code: 43212
- Area codes: 614 and 380
- FIPS code: 39-31304
- GNIS feature ID: 1086103
- Website: www.grandviewheights.gov

Grandview Heights, sometimes shortened Grandview, is a city in Franklin County, Ohio, United States. The population was 8,085 at the 2020 census.

== History ==
The city was originally part of Marble Cliff, one of the first suburbs of Columbus, which settled as a community in 1890 and incorporated as the "Hamlet of Marble Cliff" in 1901. Grandview Heights became a separate village in 1906, and a city in 1931.

=== Bank Block ===
The Bank Block is a historic strip mall along Grandview Avenue, the main commercial road. One of the first to include a parking lot, the Bank Block was built in 1927. It first included a grocery store, a pharmacy, and a bank among a total of 12 storefronts.

== Geography ==
According to the United States Census Bureau, the city has a total area of 1.33 square miles (3.44 km^{2}), all land.

== Demographics ==
Historical population
Census	Pop.	Note	%±
1910	489		—
1920	1,185		142.3%
1930	6,358		436.5%
1940	6,960		9.5%
1950	7,659		10.0%
1960	8,270		8.0%
1970	8,460		2.3%
1980	7,420		−12.3%
1990	7,010		−5.5%
2000	6,695		−4.5%
2010	6,536		−2.4%
2020	8,085		23.7%
2023 (est.)	8,841		9.4%

=== 2020 census ===
As of the 2020 census, Grandview Heights had a population of 8,085. The median age was 33.8 years. 18.2% of residents were under the age of 18 and 11.5% of residents were 65 years of age or older. For every 100 females there were 92.9 males, and for every 100 females age 18 and over there were 91.6 males.

The 2020 Decennial Census Demographic and Housing Characteristics data show 100.0% of residents lived in urban areas, while 0.0% lived in rural areas.

There were 3,854 households in Grandview Heights, of which 23.9% had children under the age of 18 living in them. Of all households, 39.2% were married-couple households, 21.3% were households with a male householder and no spouse or partner present, and 29.1% were households with a female householder and no spouse or partner present. About 33.9% of all households were made up of individuals and 7.0% had someone living alone who was 65 years of age or older.

There were 4,018 housing units, of which 4.1% were vacant. The homeowner vacancy rate was 0.4% and the rental vacancy rate was 3.7%.

Racial composition as of the 2020 census
Race	Number	Percent
White	7,204	89.1%
Black or African American	119	1.5%
American Indian and Alaska Native	7	0.1%
Asian	231	2.9%
Native Hawaiian and Other Pacific Islander	3	0.0%
Some other race	81	1.0%
Two or more races	440	5.4%
Hispanic or Latino (of any race)	257	3.2%

=== 2010 census ===
As of the census of 2010, there were 6,536 people, 2,927 households, and 1,680 families living in the city. The population density was 4,914.3 inhabitants per square mile (1,897.4/km^{2}). There were 3,087 housing units at an average density of 2,321.1 per square mile (896.2/km^{2}). The racial makeup of the city was 94.6% White, 1.4% African American, 0.2% Native American, 1.2% Asian, 0.8% from other races, and 1.9% from two or more races. Hispanic or Latino of any race were 2.4% of the population.

There were 2,927 households, of which 28.8% had children under the age of 18 living with them, 43.6% were married couples living together, 9.7% had a female householder with no husband present, 4.1% had a male householder with no wife present, and 42.6% were non-families. 31.5% of all households were made up of individuals, and 8.1% had someone living alone who was 65 years of age or older. The average household size was 2.23 and the average family size was 2.86.

The median age in the city was 35.7 years. 21.5% of residents were under the age of 18; 7.7% were between the ages of 18 and 24; 33.7% were from 25 to 44; 27.6% were from 45 to 64; and 9.5% were 65 years of age or older. The gender makeup of the city was 48.5% male and 51.5% female.

=== 2000 census ===
As of the census of 2000, there were 6,695 people, 2,953 households, and 1,742 families living in the city. The population density was 4,972.1 inhabitants per square mile (1,919.7/km^{2}). There were 3,034 housing units at an average density of 2,253.2 per square mile (870.0/km^{2}). The racial makeup of the city was 95.92% White, 1.34% African American, 0.06% Native American, 1.00% Asian, 0.42% from other races, and 1.25% from two or more races. Hispanic or Latino of any race were 1.51% of the population.

There were 2,953 households, out of which 30.5% had children under the age of 18 living with them, 44.6% were married couples living together, 11.1% had a female householder with no husband present, and 41.0% were non-families. 32.2% of all households were made up of individuals, and 9.1% had someone living alone who was 65 years of age or older. The average household size was 2.27 and the average family size was 2.92.

In the city the population was spread out, with 24.7% under the age of 18, 6.8% from 18 to 24, 34.6% from 25 to 44, 23.5% from 45 to 64, and 10.3% who were 65 years of age or older. The median age was 36 years. For every 100 females, there were 91.7 males. For every 100 females age 18 and over, there were 88.2 males.

The median income for a household in the city was $51,328, and the median income for a family was $63,713. Males had a median income of $41,989 versus $36,711 for females. The per capita income for the city was $27,495. About 3.0% of families and 4.5% of the population were below the poverty line, including 5.4% of those under age 18 and 5.2% of those age 65 or over.

== Government ==
Grandview Heights is split between the US Congressional Districts: OH-3, OH-15.

== Infrastructure ==
Grandview Heights maintains its own police and fire departments and an independent school district. Its neighbor, Marble Cliff, contracts with the city to provide these services to its own residents.

== Education ==
Grandview Heights is in the Grandview Heights City Schools district. This includes Grandview Heights High School which serves both the city of Grandview Heights and the village of Marble Cliff.

== Gallery ==
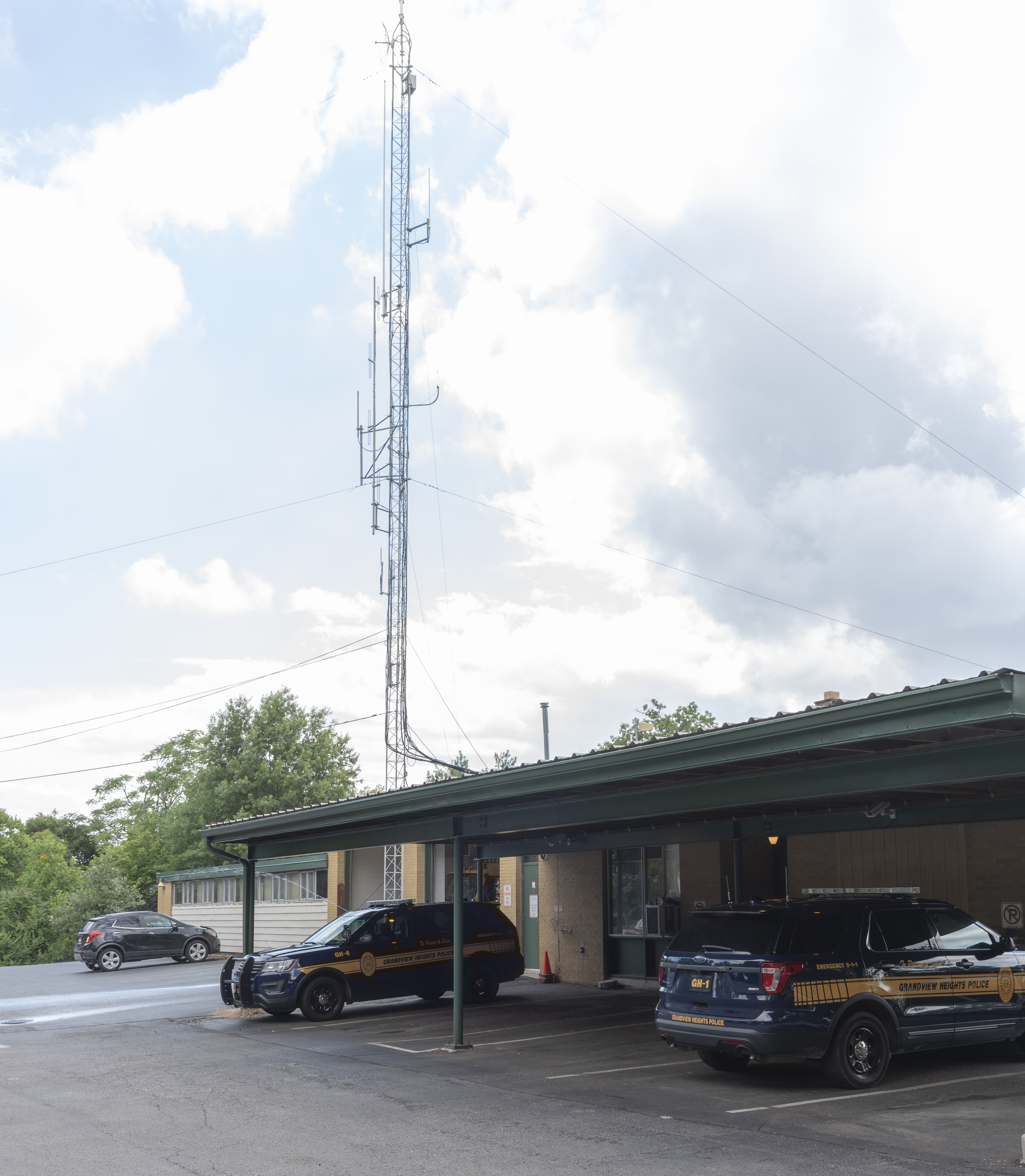
Police Department Headquarters

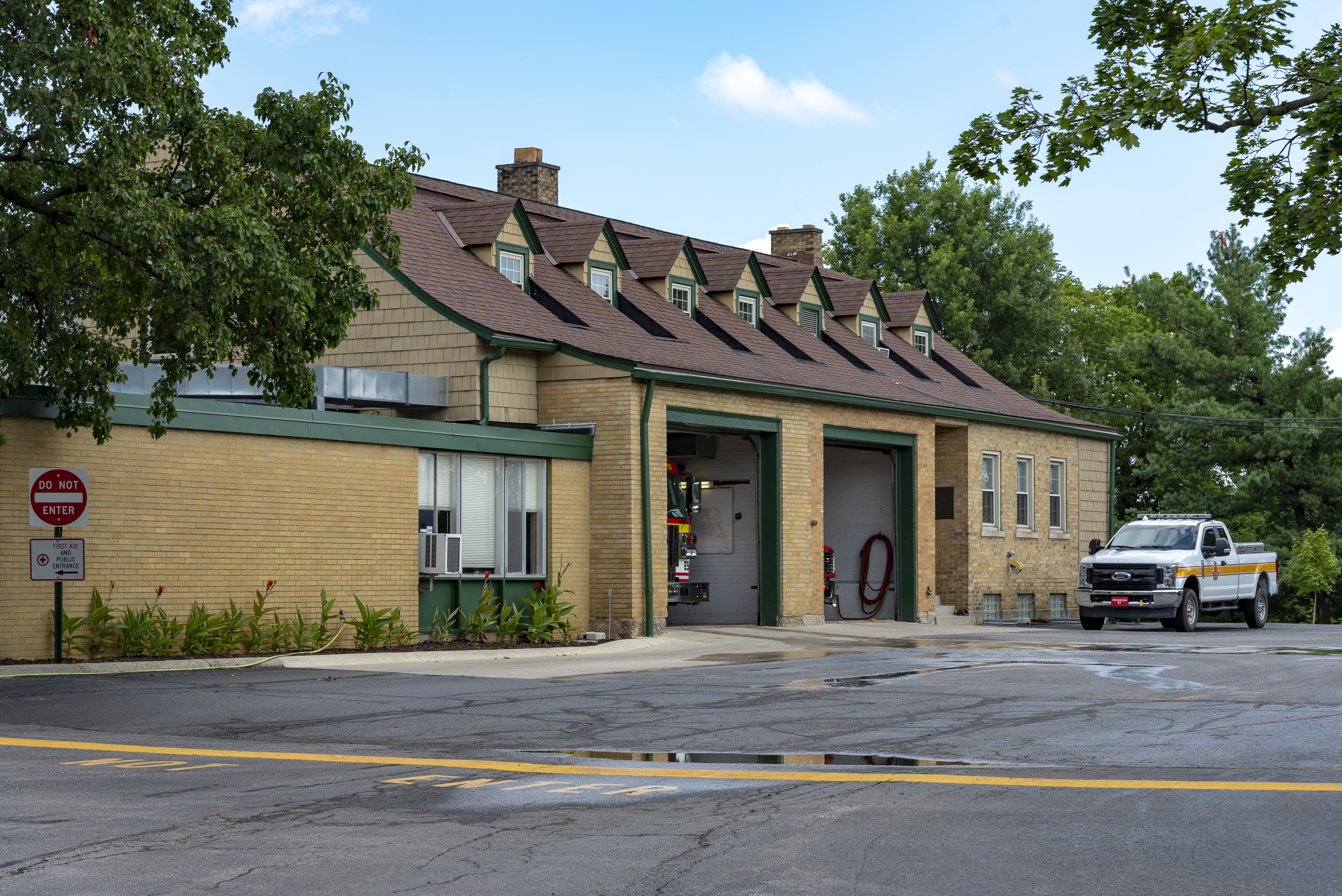
Fire Department Headquarters

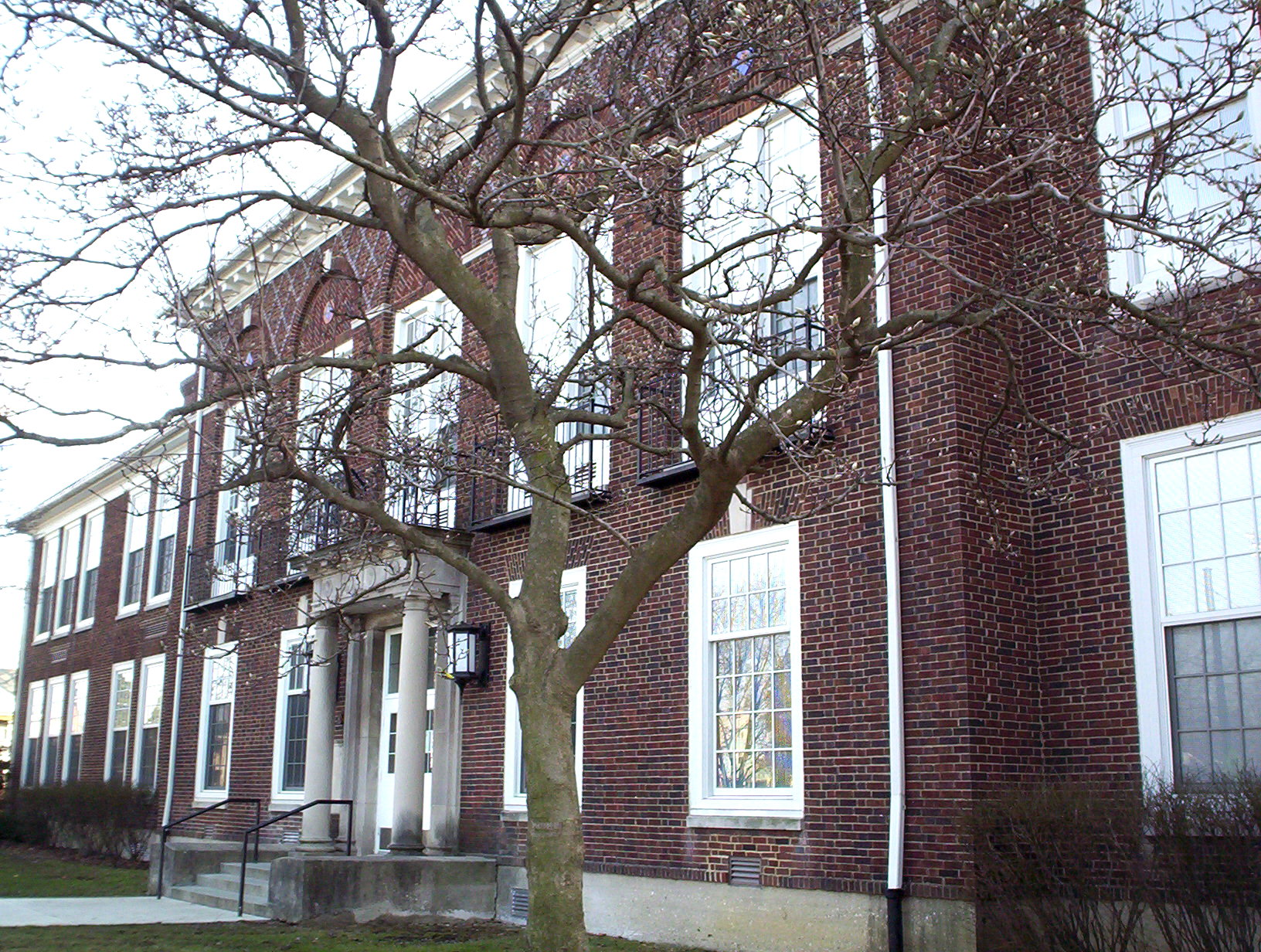
Grandview Heights High School

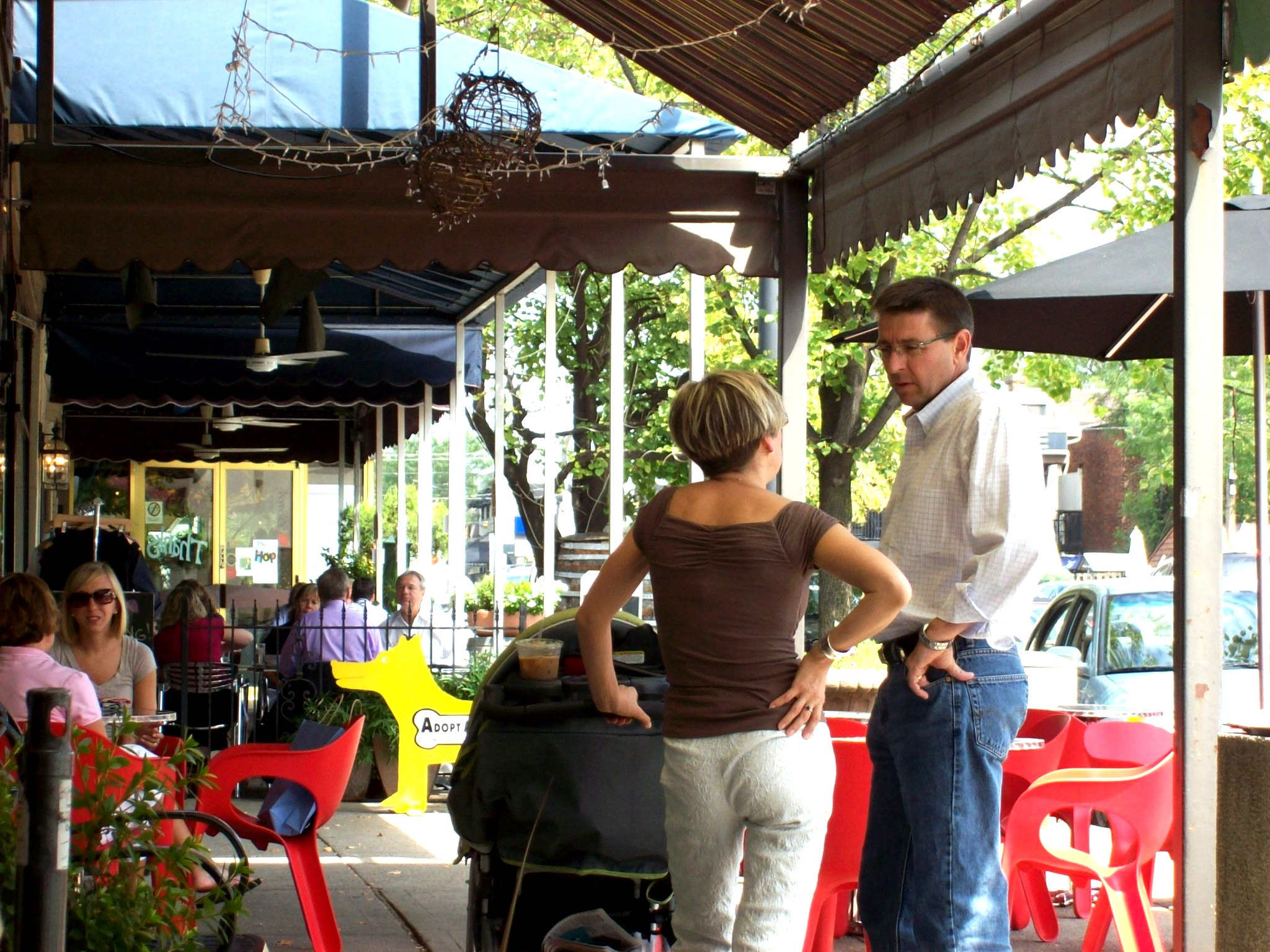
Grandview Avenue

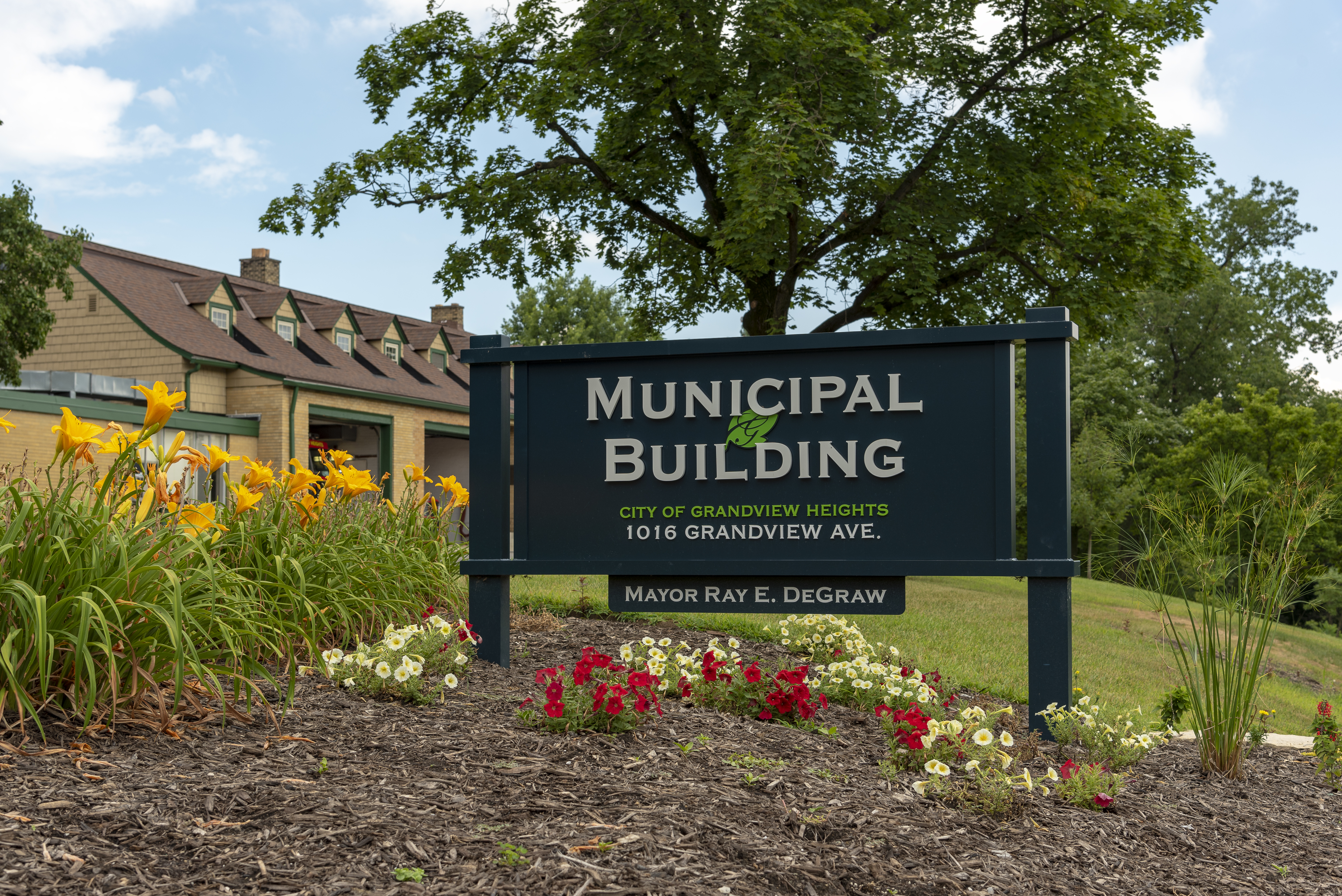
Grandview Heights Municipal Building Sign
