= Prince Sports =

American Sports Equipment company

Prince Global Sports, LLC
- Company type: Subsidiary
- Industry: Sporting goods
- Founded: 1970; 56 years ago
- Founder: Robert H. McClure
- Headquarters: Atlanta, Georgia, US
- Area served: Worldwide
- Products: Rackets, footwear, apparel, tennis balls, accessories
- Parent: Authentic Brands Group
- Website: princetennis.com

Prince Global Sports, LLC is an American sporting goods manufacturing company based in Atlanta, Georgia. Founded in 1970, Prince's range of products includes rackets, footwear, apparel, tennis balls, pickleball paddles, stringing machines, hats and bags.

== History ==
The company was founded in 1970 by Robert Hirt McClure (1893–1991) of Princeton, New Jersey (the origin of the company's name), as a manufacturer of tennis-ball machines, and soon after, rackets. Howard Head, founder of the Head sporting goods company, took tennis lessons following his retirement and used a Prince tennis ball machine, but was frustrated by his slow improvement. Head joined the Prince company in the early 1970s and developed the company's signature oversized tennis racket. Although the Prince Classic aluminum racket was the first oversized racquet to be patented, the Bentley Fortissimo preceded the patent by two years, causing Germany to invalidate the patent.

During those years, the company was owned by a variety of different firms, including the Benetton Group of Italy, Lincolnshire Management, Inc. (which acquired Prince from Benetton in 2003) and Nautic Partners LLC.

In July 2012, Authentic Brands Group acquired the Prince brand name from Nautic Partners in a procedure that included a voluntary petition for Chapter 11 reorganization in U.S. Bankruptcy Court. Prince Sports' portfolio of brands included Prince (tennis, squash and badminton), Ektelon (racquetball) and Viking (platform/paddle tennis). Its tennis unit recorded $59 million in sales in 2011. Authentic Brands owned the intellectual property rights for the estates of Marilyn Monroe and Bob Marley, among other celebrities.

By September 2012, the Waitt Company agreed to a 40-year license to operate the Prince brand. Prince Global Sports now operates as a subsidiary of Athletic Brands Holding Company, which is majority-owned by the Waitt Company. The company's portfolio of brands also includes Ektelon, Viking and Battle.

After recovering from bankruptcy, in March 2014, Prince announced that it would move its headquarters from Bordentown, New Jersey, to Atlanta. Prince's CEO Mike Ballardie stated that Atlanta had a thriving tennis community with more people playing tennis than any other American city, which made it a great base for the company. Atlanta also boasted the largest city tennis league in the world, with more than 80,000 members of the Atlanta Lawn Tennis Association.

== Sponsorships ==
=== Tennis ===
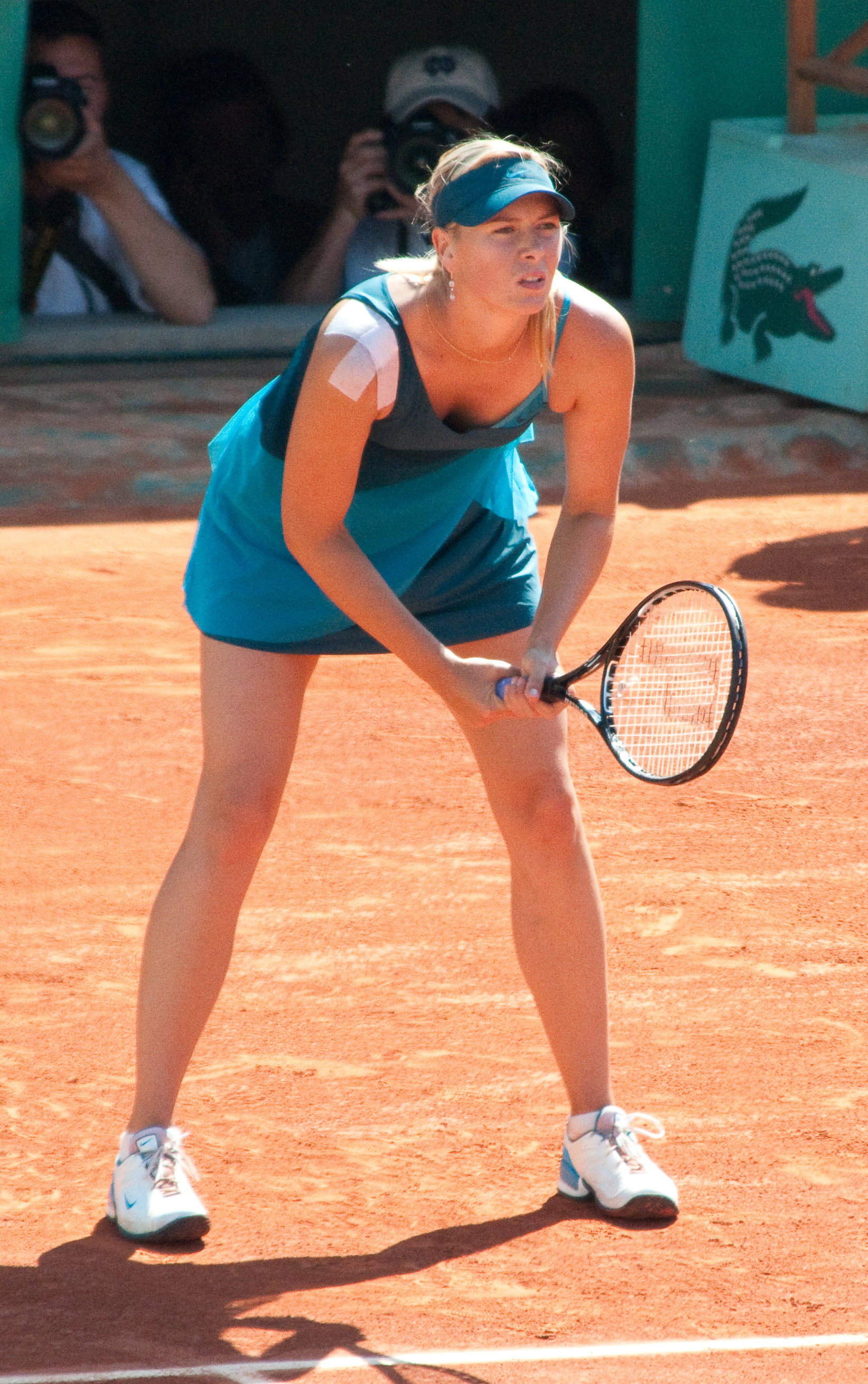
Maria Sharapova with a Prince racket at the 2009 French Open

==== Men ====
- (Spain) Marcel Granollers

==== Women ====
- (Germany) Mona Barthel
- (Russia) Vera Zvonareva

==== Retired players ====
- (Argentina) Guillermo Coria
- (Argentina) David Nalbandian
- (Argentina) Gabriela Sabatini
- (Australia) Pat Cash
- (Australia) Pat Rafter
- (China) Peng Shuai
- (Czech Republic) Jana Novotná
- (Spain) Albert Costa
- (Spain) David Ferrer
- (Spain) Juan Carlos Ferrero
- (Spain) María José Martínez Sánchez
- (France) Marion Bartoli
- (United Kingdom) Oliver Golding
- (Japan) Ai Sugiyama
- (Germany) Annika Beck
- (Russia) Alex Bogomolov Jr.
- (Russia) Nikolay Davydenko
- (Russia) Maria Sharapova
- (Serbia) Jelena Janković
- (Slovakia) Daniela Hantuchová
- (Sweden) Johan Brunström
- (Sweden) Kent Carlsson
- (United States) Andre Agassi
- (United States) Bob Bryan
- (United States) Mike Bryan
- (United States) Jennifer Capriati
- (United States) John Isner
- (United States) Michael Chang
- (United States) Kathy Rinaldi
- (United States) Pam Shriver

=== Squash ===
- (Egypt) Ramy Ashour
- (France) Camille Serme
- (England) Emily Whitlock
- (Hong Kong) Rebecca Chiu
- (Malaysia) Delia Arnold
- (England) Peter Nicol
- (Scotland) John White
- (Wales) David Evans
- (England) Cassie Jackman
- (France) Julien Bonetat
