= Stringing machine =

Tool to install strings on racquets

A stringing machine is a tool used to install strings into a racquet through a process called racquet stringing. These machines vary in features, accuracy and price.

== Stringing time ==
Stringing a racquet can take up to an hour for a novice, or around twenty minutes for a skilled stringer; during professional tournament a very skilled stringer may be asked to string a racquet while the player is on court. These string jobs can take just over 10 minutes for a seasoned tournament stringer.

== Stringing differences between sports ==
=== Tennis ===
Tennis strings are usually made up of gut, polyester or a hybrid of the two but have been known to consist of other materials including: nylon, metal, multifilament and Kevlar. Racquet tension can vary from anywhere from 30-70 lbs. Professional players tend to opt for the upper limit of the racquet tension range, however, an increasing number of recent players have been choosing lower tensions to favour power.

=== Badminton ===
Badminton strings are usually made up of microfilament, but historically used to be strung with gut. Racquet tension can vary from 18-36 lbs. Professional players tend to opt for the upper limit of the racquet tension range.

=== Squash ===
Squash strings are usually made up of microfilament or gut. Racquet tension can vary from 20-30 lbs. Professional players tend to opt for the upper limit of the racquet tension range.

== Types of stringing machines ==
=== Drop weight stringing machines ===
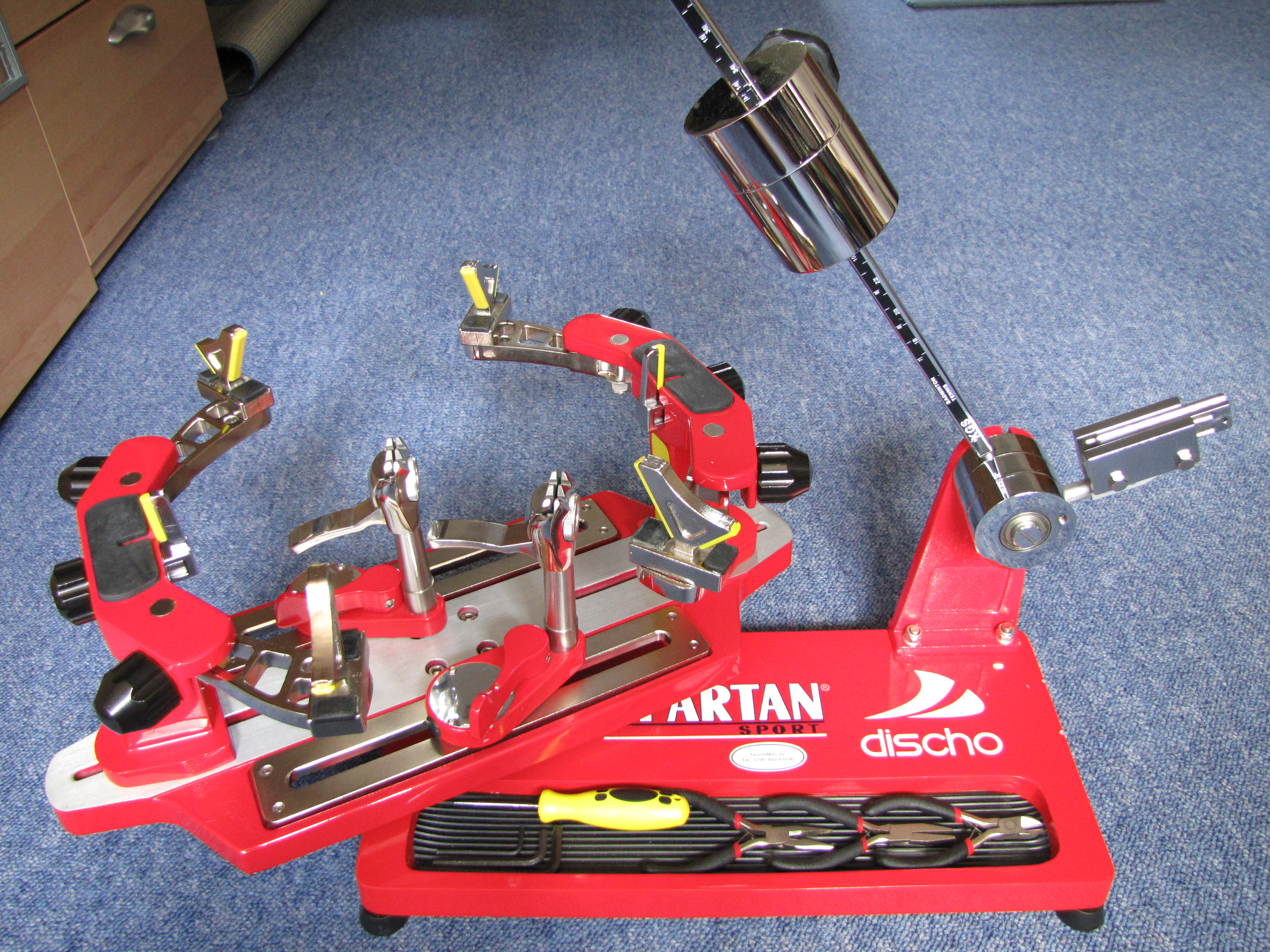
A drop weight stringing machine

Drop weight stringing machines are inexpensive that use a weighted bar to achieve the desired string tension. Using only weight and simple laws of physics (torque = force x distance) they are very precise and also constant pull type of machines. They are the most maintenance-free type of machines and also the most affordable. As a result, these stringing machines are popular among those learning how to string a racquet or string on a casual basis. On the other hand, slow tensioning times are the main reason for stringers choosing more expensive machines.

=== Manual crank (lockout) stringing machines ===
Manual crank (lockout) stringing machines use a crank to achieve the correct tension, at which point the tension mechanism locks into place. These stringing machines allow racquets to be strung more quickly than with drop weight machines. The lockout action permits more tension loss than drop weight and constant pull actions.

=== Electronic stringing machines ===
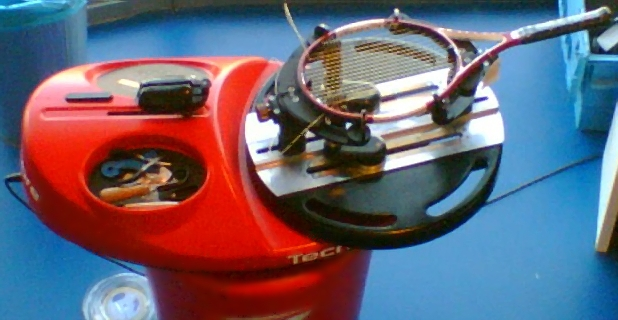
A Tecnifibre electronic stringing machine

Electronic stringing machines control the tension with a computer-directed electric motor, resulting in fast paced stringing and exceptional accuracy. This is the most common kind of stringing machine found in racquet sport shops. Reliable constant pull stringing machines usually cost $3,000 and more. This type of stringing machine is found at nearly all professional tournaments.

There are two types of electronic tension mechanisms: constant pull and lock out. Constant pull, as the name suggests, pulls the string and continues pulling until the desired tension is reached. The tension mechanism will ensure the string tension remains correct at all times, making stringing more consistent and accurate, as string stretching is taken into account. Lock out electronic stringing machines are similar to crank machines as they will pull to the desired tension but no longer monitor any reduction in tension over time. Constant pull technology will therefore offer greater levels of string accuracy.

Most electronic stringing machines will offer many time saving and comfort features that include single action clamp bases, string measurer, electronic brake, height adjustable stand and color touch-screen. The most recent stringing machines include an automatic turntable tilt function that turns at a small but noticeable angle when weaving the cross strings of a racquet. These features substantially reduce stress on the shoulders and back for a stringer.

While affordable (sub £500) models offer a raft of productive features, the increased outlay and need for regular maintenance make it a harder investment to justify when getting started.
