= List of Grand Slam champions =

List of Grand Slam champions can refer to:

- List of Grand Slam men's singles champions
- List of Grand Slam women's singles champions
- List of Grand Slam men's doubles champions
- List of Grand Slam women's doubles champions
- List of Grand Slam mixed doubles champions
- List of Grand Slam boys' singles champions
- List of Grand Slam girls' singles champions
- List of Grand Slam boys' doubles champions
- List of Grand Slam girls' doubles champions
