= Lists of tennis records and statistics =

The following articles list tennis records and statistics:

== General ==
=== Grand Slam ===
- Grand Slam
- List of Grand Slam and related tennis records
- List of Grand Slam mixed doubles champions
- List of quad wheelchair tennis champions
- List of Open Era Grand Slam champions by country
- List of Grand Slam singles champions by country
- List of Grand Slam singles champions in Open Era with age of first title

=== Other ===
- Current tennis rankings
- ITF rankings
- ITF World Champions
- List of tennis players career achievements
- List of tennis title leaders in the Open Era
- List of highest ranked tennis players per country
- List of Olympic medalists in tennis
- List of tennis rivalries
- List of tennis timelines
- Longest tennis match records & Shortest tennis match records
- Longest tiebreaker in tennis
- Fastest recorded tennis serves
- Ace & Double fault
- Bagel & Golden set

== Men's tennis ==
=== Grand Slam ===
- Chronological list of men's Grand Slam tennis champions
- List of Grand Slam men's singles champions
- List of Grand Slam men's doubles champions
- List of Grand Slam boys' singles champions
- List of Grand Slam boys' doubles champions
- List of men's wheelchair tennis champions
- List of Grand Slam men's singles finals
- Tennis performance timeline comparison (men)
- Major professional tennis tournaments before the Open Era

=== Other ===
- All-time tennis records – Men's singles
- Open Era tennis records – Men's singles
- Tennis male players statistics
- World number 1 ranked male tennis players
- Top ten ranked male tennis players
- Top ten ranked male tennis players (1912–1972)
- ATP Masters 1000 tournaments
- ATP Masters 1000 singles records and statistics
- ATP Masters 1000 doubles records and statistics
- List of Davis Cup champions

=== ATP ===
- ATP Tour records
- ATP rankings
- List of ATP number 1 ranked singles tennis players
- List of ATP number 1 ranked doubles tennis players
- List of ATP Big Titles singles champions
- List of ATP Big Titles doubles champions
- ATP Awards
- ATP Finals appearances
- ATP Cup champions

== Women's tennis ==
=== Grand Slam ===
- Chronological list of women's Grand Slam tennis champions
- List of Grand Slam women's singles champions
- List of Grand Slam women's doubles champions
- List of Grand Slam girls' singles champions
- List of Grand Slam girls' doubles champions
- List of women's wheelchair tennis champions
- List of Grand Slam women's singles finals
- Tennis performance timeline comparison (women) (1978–present)
- Tennis performance timeline comparison (women) (1884–1977)

=== Other ===
- All-time tennis records – Women's singles
- Open Era tennis records – Women's singles
- World number 1 ranked female tennis players
- Top ten ranked female tennis players
- Top ten ranked female tennis players (1921–1974)
- Billie Jean King Cup#List of championship finals
- WTA 1000 tournaments
- WTA 1000 Series singles records and statistics
- WTA 1000 Series doubles records and statistics

=== WTA ===
- WTA Tour records
- WTA rankings
- List of WTA number 1 ranked singles tennis players
- List of WTA number 1 ranked doubles tennis players
- List of WTA Tour top-level tournament singles champions
- List of WTA Tour top-level tournament doubles champions
- WTA Finals appearances
- WTA Awards
