= ATP Records =

ATP Records may refer to:

- ATP Tour records, a list of records related to the Association of Tennis Professionals
- ATP Recordings, a British record label
