= ATP Tour records =

List of tennis stats

The ATP Tour is the modern top-level men's professional tennis circuit. It was introduced in 1990 and it is administered by the Association of Tennis Professionals (ATP). All the records listed here are only for the players who played most of their careers on the ATP Tour and they are based on official ATP data. The names of active players appear in boldface. However, no boldface is used in lists exclusively for active players.

== All tournaments ==
- All totals since the ATP Tour inception in 1990.

=== Titles and finals ===
- Active players in **bold**.

No.	Titles
103	(Switzerland) Roger Federer
102	(Serbia) **Novak Djokovic**
92	(Spain) Rafael Nadal
64	(United States) Pete Sampras
52 (Note: 8 titles before the ATP Tour era.)	(United States) Andre Agassi
46	(United Kingdom) Andy Murray
39 (Note: 5 titles before the ATP Tour era.)	(Austria) Thomas Muster
32	(United States) Andy Roddick
31 (Note: 3 titles before the ATP Tour era.)	(United States) Michael Chang
30	(Australia) Lleyton Hewitt
30	(Italy) **Jannik Sinner**
30	(Spain) **Carlos Alcaraz**

No.	Finals
157	(Switzerland) Roger Federer
146	(Serbia) **Novak Djokovic**
131	(Spain) Rafael Nadal
88	(United States) Pete Sampras
79 (Note: 11 finals before the ATP Tour era.)	(United States) Andre Agassi
71	(United Kingdom) Andy Murray
54 (Note: 4 finals before the ATP Tour era.)	(United States) Michael Chang
52	(United States) Andy Roddick
52	(Spain) David Ferrer
49	(Croatia) Goran Ivanišević
top 10 finals

%	W–L	Finals record
83.0	39–8	(Austria) Thomas Muster
76.9	30–9	(Italy) **Jannik Sinner**
76.9	30–9	(Spain) **Carlos Alcaraz**
75.0	21–7	(Russia) Nikolay Davydenko
73.1	19–7	(Sweden) Thomas Enqvist
72.7	64–24	(United States) Pete Sampras
70.2	92–39	(Spain) Rafael Nadal
69.9	102–44	(Serbia) **Novak Djokovic**
69.0	20–9	(Brazil) Gustavo Kuerten
66.7	60–30	(United States) Andre Agassi
minimum 20 finals

==== Other active players ====
No.	Titles
26	(Germany) Alexander Zverev
25	(Russia) Daniil Medvedev
21	(Croatia) Marin Čilić
18	(Russia) Andrey Rublev
14	(Norway) Casper Ruud
13	(Greece) Stefanos Tsitsipas
12	(United States) Taylor Fritz
11	(Australia) Alex de Minaur
10	(Italy) Matteo Berrettini
minimum 10 titles

No.	Finals
45	(Russia) Daniil Medvedev
45	(Germany) Alexander Zverev
39	(Italy) Jannik Sinner
39	(Spain) Carlos Alcaraz
37	(Croatia) Marin Čilić
31	(Greece) Stefanos Tsitsipas
31	(Russia) Andrey Rublev
27	(Norway) Casper Ruud
25	(United States) Taylor Fritz
23	(Australia) Alex de Minaur
22	(Canada) Félix Auger-Aliassime
21	(Bulgaria) Grigor Dimitrov
minimum 20 finals

%	W–L	Finals record
58.1	18–13	(Russia) Andrey Rublev
57.8	26–19	(Germany) Alexander Zverev
56.8	21–16	(Croatia) Marin Čilić
55.6	25–20	(Russia) Daniil Medvedev
51.9	14–13	(Norway) Casper Ruud
48.0	12–13	(United States) Taylor Fritz
47.8	11–12	(Australia) Alex de Minaur
42.9	9–12	(Bulgaria) Grigor Dimitrov
41.9	13–18	(Greece) Stefanos Tsitsipas
40.9	9–13	(Canada) Félix Auger-Aliassime
minimum 20 finals

=== Matches ===
- Active players in **bold** .

%	W–L	Match record
82.97	1184–243	(Serbia) **Novak Djokovic**
82.57	1080–228	(Spain) Rafael Nadal
81.98	1251–275	(Switzerland) Roger Federer
79.18	734–193	(United States) Pete Sampras
76.72	735–223	(United States) Andre Agassi
74.49	403–138	(Germany) Boris Becker
74.18	612–213	(United States) Andy Roddick
73.83	739–262	(United Kingdom) Andy Murray
73.31	423–154	(Sweden) Stefan Edberg
71.62	439–174	(Argentina) Juan Martín del Potro
minimum 400 wins (top 10)

No.	Matches won
1,251	(Switzerland) Roger Federer
1,184	(Serbia) **Novak Djokovic**
1,080	(Spain) Rafael Nadal
739	(United Kingdom) Andy Murray
735	(United States) Andre Agassi (Note: 137 match wins before the ATP Tour era.)
734	(United States) Pete Sampras (Note: 28 match wins before the ATP Tour era.)
734	(Spain) David Ferrer
640	(Czech Republic) Tomáš Berdych
616	(Australia) Lleyton Hewitt
612	(United States) Andy Roddick
top 10 wins

No.	Matches played
1,526	(Switzerland) Roger Federer
1,427	(Serbia) **Novak Djokovic**
1,308	(Spain) Rafael Nadal
1,111	(Spain) David Ferrer
1,018	(France) Richard Gasquet
1,006	(Spain) Fernando Verdasco
1,001	(United Kingdom) Andy Murray
996	(Spain) Feliciano López
985	(Switzerland) Stan Wawrinka
982	(Czech Republic) Tomáš Berdych
top 10 played

==== Other active players ====
%	W–L	Match record
82.37	327–70	(Spain) Carlos Alcaraz
80.40	365–89	(Italy) Jannik Sinner
70.88	589–242	(Germany) Alexander Zverev
70.12	474–202	(Russia) Daniil Medvedev
66.23	404–206	(Greece) Stefanos Tsitsipas
65.29	333–177	(Norway) Casper Ruud
63.59	351–201	(Australia) Alex de Minaur
63.56	232–133	(Italy) Matteo Berrettini
63.41	402–232	(Russia) Andrey Rublev
63.11	207–121	(Australia) Nick Kyrgios
62.44	610–367	(Croatia) Marin Čilić
61.97	383–235	(United States) Taylor Fritz
61.51	302–189	(Canada) Félix Auger-Aliassime
61.50	254–159	(United States) Tommy Paul
60.52	486–317	(Bulgaria) Grigor Dimitrov
minimum 200 wins (60%)

No.	Matches won
610	(Croatia) Marin Čilić
589	(Germany) Alexander Zverev
486	(Bulgaria) Grigor Dimitrov
474	(Russia) Daniil Medvedev
404	(Greece) Stefanos Tsitsipas
402	(Russia) Andrey Rublev
383	(United States) Taylor Fritz
365	(Italy) Jannik Sinner
351	(Australia) Alex de Minaur
341	(Russia) Karen Khachanov
337	(France) Adrian Mannarino
333	(Norway) Casper Ruud
327	(Spain) Carlos Alcaraz
302	(Canada) Félix Auger-Aliassime
minimum 300 wins

No.	Matches played
977	(Croatia) Marin Čilić
831	(Germany) Alexander Zverev
803	(Bulgaria) Grigor Dimitrov
724	(France) Adrian Mannarino
676	(Russia) Daniil Medvedev
634	(Russia) Andrey Rublev
618	(United States) Taylor Fritz
610	(Greece) Stefanos Tsitsipas
590	(Russia) Karen Khachanov
552	(Australia) Alex de Minaur
549	(Germany) Jan-Lennard Struff
549	(Spain) Pablo Carreño Busta
518	(United States) Frances Tiafoe
510	(Norway) Casper Ruud
507	(Netherlands) Robin Haase
minimum 500 played

== Big Titles ==
The 'Big Titles' are the Grand Slams, the ATP Masters, the ATP Finals and the Olympics.

No.	Big Titles
72	**(Serbia) Novak Djokovic**
59	(Spain) Rafael Nadal
54	(Switzerland) Roger Federer
30	(United States) Pete Sampras
27	(United States) Andre Agassi

No.	Finals
108	(Serbia) Novak Djokovic
92	(Switzerland) Roger Federer
86	(Spain) Rafael Nadal
43	(United States) Pete Sampras
43	(United States) Andre Agassi

%	W–L	Finals record
69.8	30–13	(United States) Pete Sampras
68.6	59–27	(Spain) Rafael Nadal
66.7	72–36	(Serbia) Novak Djokovic
62.8	27–16	(United States) Andre Agassi
58.7	54–38	(Switzerland) Roger Federer
minimum 40 finals

=== Big Titles sweep ===
- The event at which the sweep was completed indicated in **bold**.

Player	AU	FR	WB	US	YEC	OG	IW	MIA	MON	MAD	ROM	CAN	CIN	SHA	PAR
(Serbia) Novak Djokovic	2008	2016	2011	2011	2008	**2024**	2008	2007	2013	2011	2008	2007	2018	2012	2009

== ATP Finals ==
No.	Titles
7	(Serbia) **Novak Djokovic**
6	(Switzerland) Roger Federer
5	(United States) Pete Sampras
2	(Germany) Boris Becker
2	(Australia) Lleyton Hewitt
2	(Germany) **Alexander Zverev**
2	(Italy) **Jannik Sinner**

No.	Finals
10	(Switzerland) Roger Federer
9	(Serbia) **Novak Djokovic**
6	(United States) Pete Sampras
4	(Germany) Boris Becker
4	(United States) Andre Agassi

No.	Consecutive titles	Years
4	(Serbia) **Novak Djokovic**	2012–15
2	(United States) Pete Sampras	1996–97
2	(Australia) Lleyton Hewitt	2001–02
2	(Switzerland) Roger Federer	2003–04
2	(Switzerland) Roger Federer	2006–07
2	(Switzerland) Roger Federer	2010–11
2	(Serbia) Novak Djokovic	2022–23
2	(Italy) Jannik Sinner	2024–25

== ATP Masters tournaments ==
Singles
No.	Titles
40	(Serbia) **Novak Djokovic**
36	(Spain) Rafael Nadal
28	(Switzerland) Roger Federer
17	(United States) Andre Agassi
14	(United Kingdom) Andy Murray
11	(United States) Pete Sampras
10	(Italy) **Jannik Sinner**
9	(Spain) **Carlos Alcaraz**
8	(Austria) Thomas Muster
7	(United States) Michael Chang
7	(Germany) **Alexander Zverev**

No.	Finals
60	**Novak Djokovic**
53	Rafael Nadal
50	Roger Federer
22	Andre Agassi
21	Andy Murray
19	Pete Sampras
14	(Italy) **Jannik Sinner**
13	**Alexander Zverev**
11	Boris Becker
11	**Daniil Medvedev**
11	**Carlos Alcaraz**

No.	Titlesin a season	Year(s)	
6	Novak Djokovic	2015	
5	Novak Djokovic	2011	
5	Rafael Nadal	2013	
5	Jannik Sinner	2026	
4	Roger Federer	2	2005, 06
4	Novak Djokovic	2	2014, 16
4	Rafael Nadal	2005	
4+ titles

=== Career Golden Masters ===
Player	Indian Wells (hard)	Miami (hard)	Monte Carlo (clay)	Madrid (clay)	Italy (clay)	Canada (hard)	Cincinnati (hard)	Shanghai (hard)	Paris (hard indoor)
Novak Djokovic	2008	2007	2013	2011	2008	2007	**2018**	2012	2009
Novak Djokovic	2011	2011	2015	2016	2011	2011	**2020**	2013	2013
Jannik Sinner	2026	2024	2026	2026	**2026**	2023	2024	2024	2025

== ATP 500 tournaments ==
This is the class of tournaments in which the winner earns 500 ATP ranking points. This format began in 2009.

- The records include the equivalent former classes called the ATP Championship Series (1990–99) and ATP International Series Gold (2000–08).

No.	Titles
24	(Switzerland) Roger Federer
23	(Spain) Rafael Nadal
16	(Serbia) **Novak Djokovic**
12	(United States) Pete Sampras
11	(Spain) **Carlos Alcaraz**
10	(Spain) David Ferrer
9	(Germany) Boris Becker
9	(United Kingdom) Andy Murray
9	(Argentina) Juan Martín del Potro
8	(Sweden) Stefan Edberg

No.	Finals
31	(Switzerland) Roger Federer
29	(Spain) Rafael Nadal
19	(Spain) David Ferrer
19	(Serbia) **Novak Djokovic**
14	(Germany) Boris Becker
14	(Spain) **Carlos Alcaraz**
13	(United States) Pete Sampras
13	(Argentina) Juan Martín del Potro
12	(Sweden) Stefan Edberg
12	(Croatia) Goran Ivanišević
12	(Japan) Kei Nishikori
12	(Greece) **Stefanos Tsitsipas**
12	(Russia) **Andrey Rublev**

No.	Titles in a season	Year
4	(Germany) Boris Becker	1990
4	(Sweden) Stefan Edberg	1991
4	(Argentina) Juan Martín del Potro	2013
3	(Czechoslovakia) Ivan Lendl	1990
3	(United States) Pete Sampras	1996
3	(Spain) Rafael Nadal	2005
3	(Serbia) **Novak Djokovic**	2009
3	(Spain) David Ferrer	2015
3	(Switzerland) Roger Federer	2015
3	(United Kingdom) Andy Murray	2016
3	(Switzerland) Roger Federer	2019
3	(Austria) Dominic Thiem	2019
3	(Russia) **Andrey Rublev**	2020
3	(Spain) **Carlos Alcaraz**	2025
3	(Spain) **Carlos Alcaraz**	2026

== ATP 250 tournaments ==
This is the class of tournaments in which the winner earns 250 ATP ranking points. This format began in 2009.

- The records include the equivalent former classes called the ATP World Series (1990–99) and ATP International Series (2000–08).

No.	Titles
26	(Austria) Thomas Muster
25	(Switzerland) Roger Federer
22	(Australia) Lleyton Hewitt
21	(United States) Andy Roddick
20	(United States) Pete Sampras
19	(United States) Michael Chang
19	(Russia) Yevgeny Kafelnikov
19	(United States) Andre Agassi
17	(United Kingdom) Andy Murray
17	(Croatia) **Marin Čilić**

No.	Finals
34	(Switzerland) Roger Federer
32	(Austria) Thomas Muster
32	(United States) Andy Roddick
30	(United States) Michael Chang
30	(Australia) Lleyton Hewitt
29	(United States) Pete Sampras
29	(Russia) Yevgeny Kafelnikov
28	(Spain) Carlos Moyá
28	(France) Richard Gasquet
27	(United States) Andre Agassi
27	(Croatia) **Marin Čilić**

No.	Titles in a season	Year
7	(Austria) Thomas Muster	1993
6	(Spain) Alberto Berasategui	1994
6	(Austria) Thomas Muster	1995
5	(Spain) Félix Mantilla	1997
5	(United States) Andy Roddick	2005
5	(United States) James Blake	2006
5	(Norway) **Casper Ruud**	2021

== ATP rankings ==
No.	Weeks at No. 1
428	(Serbia) **Novak Djokovic**
310	(Switzerland) Roger Federer
286	(United States) Pete Sampras
209	(Spain) Rafael Nadal
101	(United States) Andre Agassi
95	(Italy) **Jannik Sinner**
80	(Australia) Lleyton Hewitt
72	(Sweden) Stefan Edberg
66	(Spain) **Carlos Alcaraz**
58	(United States) Jim Courier
43	(Brazil) Gustavo Kuerten
41	(United Kingdom) Andy Murray
40	(Romania) Ilie Năstase
minimum 40 weeks

No.	Year-end No. 1
8	(Serbia) **Novak Djokovic**
6	(United States) Pete Sampras
5	(Switzerland) Roger Federer
5	(Spain) Rafael Nadal
2	(Sweden) Stefan Edberg
2	(Australia) Lleyton Hewitt
2	(Spain) **Carlos Alcaraz**
1	(United States) Jim Courier
1	(United States) Andre Agassi
1	(Brazil) Gustavo Kuerten
1	(United States) Andy Roddick
1	(United Kingdom) Andy Murray
1	(Italy) **Jannik Sinner**
1	(Germany) **Alexander Zverev**

== Statistics leaders ==
Correct as of 2026 ATP Finals .

=== Deciding sets ===
%	W–L	Deciding set record
72.5	158–60	(Japan) Kei Nishikori
71.3	229–92	(Serbia) **Novak Djokovic**
69.3	160–71	(United States) Pete Sampras
68.8	185–84	(Spain) Rafael Nadal
68.5	124–57	(Austria) Thomas Muster
67.5	189–91	(United Kingdom) Andy Murray
67.3	103–50	(Germany) Boris Becker
66.0	192–99	(Russia) Yevgeny Kafelnikov
65.2	129–69	(United States) Andy Roddick
64.7	235–128	(Switzerland) Roger Federer
minimum 100 wins

%	W–L	5th set record
88.2	15–2	(Spain) **Carlos Alcaraz**
78.9	15–4	(France) **Adrian Mannarino**
78.4	29–8	(Japan) Kei Nishikori
77.3	17–5	(Spain) Tommy Robredo
76.4	42–13	(Serbia) **Novak Djokovic**
70.4	19–8	(Germany) Boris Becker
70.0	21–9	(Czech Republic) Tomáš Berdych
69.6	32–14	(United States) Pete Sampras
69.2	27–12	(South Africa) Wayne Ferreira
69.0	29–13	(Sweden) Jonas Björkman
minimum 15 wins

=== Tiebreaks ===
%	W–L	Tiebreak record	Pld
65.4	469–248	(Switzerland) Roger Federer	717
65.1	358–192	(Serbia) **Novak Djokovic**	550
62.8	328–194	(United States) Pete Sampras	522
62.1	303–185	(United States) Andy Roddick	488
61.0	256–164	(Germany) **Alexander Zverev**	420
60.6	265–172	(Spain) Rafael Nadal	437
60.0	506–338	(United States) John Isner	844
57.82	244–178	(France) Gaël Monfils	422
57.75	231–169	(France) Jo-Wilfried Tsonga	400
57.6	269–198	(Croatia) Goran Ivanišević	467
minimum 400 played (Top 10)

=== Aces ===
No.	Career aces
14,470	(United States) John Isner
13,728	(Croatia) Ivo Karlović
11,478	(Switzerland) Roger Federer
10,261	(Spain) Feliciano López
10,237	(Croatia) Goran Ivanišević
9,074	(United States) Andy Roddick
8,879	(United States) Sam Querrey
8,858	(United States) Pete Sampras
8,599	(Croatia) **Marin Čilić**
8,445	(Canada) Milos Raonic
Top 10

No.	Aces in a season	Year
1,477	(Croatia) Goran Ivanišević	1996
1,447	(Croatia) Ivo Karlović	2015
1,318	(Croatia) Ivo Karlović	2007
1,260	(United States) John Isner	2015
1,213	(United States) John Isner	2018
1,185	(Croatia) Ivo Karlović	2014
1,159	(United States) John Isner	2016
1,156	(Croatia) Goran Ivanišević	1994
1,131	(Croatia) Ivo Karlović	2016
1,123	(United States) John Isner	2017
Top 10

== Doubles ==
=== All tournaments ===
==== Titles and finals ====
No.	Titles
124	(United States) Mike Bryan
119	(United States) Bob Bryan
91	(Canada) Daniel Nestor
83	(Australia) Todd Woodbridge
63	(Australia) Mark Woodforde
55	(The Bahamas) Mark Knowles
54	(Netherlands) Paul Haarhuis
54	(Sweden) Jonas Björkman
54	(India) Leander Paes
54	(Serbia) Nenad Zimonjić

No.	Finals
186	(United States) Mike Bryan
178	(United States) Bob Bryan
151	(Canada) Daniel Nestor
113	(Australia) Todd Woodbridge
99	(The Bahamas) Mark Knowles
97	(Sweden) Jonas Björkman
97	(Belarus) Max Mirnyi
97	(India) Leander Paes
96	(India) Mahesh Bhupathi
94	(Netherlands) Paul Haarhuis

No.	Team titles	
119	(United States) Mike Bryan	(United States) Bob Bryan
61	(Australia) Todd Woodbridge	(Australia) Mark Woodforde
44	(Spain) Emilio Sánchez	(Spain) Sergio Casal
40	(Canada) Daniel Nestor	(The Bahamas) Mark Knowles
39	(Netherlands) Paul Haarhuis	(Netherlands) Jacco Eltingh

==== Matches ====
No.	Matches won
1,150	(United States) Mike Bryan
1,109	(United States) Bob Bryan
1,062	(Canada) Daniel Nestor
780	(Belarus) Max Mirnyi
770	(India) Leander Paes
768 (Note: 14 match wins and 35 matches played before the ATP Tour era.)	(Australia) Todd Woodbridge
744	(The Bahamas) Mark Knowles
712	(Sweden) Jonas Björkman
710	(Serbia) Nenad Zimonjić
687	(India) Mahesh Bhupathi
678	(Brazil) **Marcelo Melo**

No.	Matches played
1,550	(Canada) Daniel Nestor
1,523	(United States) Mike Bryan
1,468	(United States) Bob Bryan
1,227	(India) Leander Paes
1,225	(Belarus) Max Mirnyi
1,158	(Brazil) **Marcelo Melo**
1,137	(Serbia) Nenad Zimonjić
1,125	(The Bahamas) Mark Knowles
1,117 (Note: 30 matches played before the ATP Tour era.)	(Czech Republic) Cyril Suk
1,051	(India) Mahesh Bhupathi
1,019	(United Kingdom) Jamie Murray

=== ATP Finals ===
No.	Titles
5	(United States) Mike Bryan
4	(Canada) Daniel Nestor
4	(United States) Bob Bryan
2	(United States) Rick Leach
2	(Australia) Todd Woodbridge
2	(Australia) Mark Woodforde
2	(Belarus) Max Mirnyi
2	(Netherlands) Jacco Eltingh
2	(Netherlands) Paul Haarhuis
2	(Serbia) Nenad Zimonjić
2	(Sweden) Jonas Björkman
2	(Finland) Henri Kontinen
2	(Australia) John Peers
2	**(France) Pierre-Hugues Herbert**
2	(France) Nicolas Mahut

No.	Finals
7	(United States) Mike Bryan
6	(Canada) Daniel Nestor
6	(United States) Bob Bryan
4	(Australia) Todd Woodbridge
4	(Australia) Mark Woodforde
4	(Belarus) Max Mirnyi

No.	Team titles	
4	(United States) Mike Bryan	(United States) Bob Bryan
2	(Australia) Todd Woodbridge	(Australia) Mark Woodforde
2	(Netherlands) Jacco Eltingh	(Netherlands) Paul Haarhuis
2	(Canada) Daniel Nestor	(Serbia) Nenad Zimonjić
2	(Finland) Henri Kontinen	(Australia) John Peers
2	**(France) Pierre-Hugues Herbert**	(France) Nicolas Mahut

=== ATP Masters tournaments ===
No.	Titles
39	(United States) Bob Bryan
39	(United States) Mike Bryan
28	(Canada) Daniel Nestor
18	(Australia) Todd Woodbridge
17	(The Bahamas) Mark Knowles

No.	Finals
59	(United States) Bob Bryan
59	(United States) Mike Bryan
47	(Canada) Daniel Nestor
30	(India) Mahesh Bhupathi
29	(The Bahamas) Mark Knowles
29	(Belarus) Max Mirnyi

No.	Team titles	
39	(United States) Mike Bryan	(United States) Bob Bryan
15	(Canada) Daniel Nestor	(The Bahamas) Mark Knowles
10	(Canada) Daniel Nestor	(Serbia) Nenad Zimonjić
14	(Australia) Todd Woodbridge	(Australia) Mark Woodforde
8	(Netherlands) Jacco Eltingh	(Netherlands) Paul Haarhuis

=== 500 series tournaments ===
No.	Titles
20	(Canada) Daniel Nestor
17	(Serbia) Nenad Zimonjić
15	(The Bahamas) Mark Knowles
14	(United States) Bob Bryan
14	(United States) Mike Bryan

No.	Finals
31	(Canada) Daniel Nestor
26	(United States) Mike Bryan
25	(Serbia) Nenad Zimonjić
24	(United States) Bob Bryan
23	(Brazil) **Marcelo Melo**

No.	Team titles	
14	(United States) Mike Bryan	(United States) Bob Bryan
11	(Australia) Todd Woodbridge	(Australia) Mark Woodforde
9	(Canada) Daniel Nestor	(The Bahamas) Mark Knowles
7	(Brazil) **Marcelo Melo**	(Poland) Łukasz Kubot
6	(Canada) Daniel Nestor	(Serbia) Nenad Zimonjić
6	(Colombia) Juan Sebastián Cabal	(Colombia) Robert Farah

=== 250 series tournaments ===
No.	Titles
47	(United States) Mike Bryan
45	(United States) Bob Bryan
34	(Australia) Todd Woodbridge
30	(Canada) Daniel Nestor
29	(Netherlands) Paul Haarhuis

No.	Finals
61	(United States) Mike Bryan
58	(United States) Bob Bryan
49	(Australia) Todd Woodbridge
49	(Canada) Daniel Nestor
47	(Sweden) Jonas Björkman

No.	Team titles	
45	(United States) Mike Bryan	(United States) Bob Bryan
22	(Australia) Todd Woodbridge	(Australia) Mark Woodforde
19	(Netherlands) Jacco Eltingh	(Netherlands) Paul Haarhuis
17	(Spain) Emilio Sánchez	(Spain) Sergio Casal
13	(Canada) Daniel Nestor	(The Bahamas) Mark Knowles
13	(India) Mahesh Bhupathi	(India) Leander Paes

== See also ==
- Lists of tennis records and statistics
- All-time tennis records – Men's singles
- Open Era tennis records – Men's singles
- List of Grand Slam men's singles champions
- List of ATP Big Titles singles champions
- List of ATP number 1 ranked singles tennis players
- ATP Masters 1000 singles records and statistics
- ATP Masters 1000 doubles records and statistics
- ATP Finals
- List of tennis tournaments
- All-time tennis records – Women's singles
- Open Era tennis records – Women's singles
- List of tennis players career achievements
- WTA Tour records
