= List of Grand Slam boys' doubles champions =

List of Boys' Doubles Junior Grand Slam tournaments tennis champions:

== Champions by year ==
Year	Australian Open	French Open	Wimbledon	US Open
1922	(Australia) C. Grogan (Australia) L. Roche	started in 1981	started in 1982	started in 1982
1923	(Australia) Edgar Moon (Australia) L. Roche			
1924	(Australia) A. Berckelman (Australia) Ray Dunlop			
1925	(Australia) Jack Crawford (Australia) Harry Hopman			
1926	(Australia) Jack Crawford (Australia) Harry Hopman			
1927	(Australia) Jack Crawford (Australia) Harry Hopman			
1928	(Australia) Jack Crawford (Australia) C. Whiteman			
1929	(Australia) C. W. Cropper (Australia) W. B. Walker			
1930	(Australia) Adrian Quist (Australia) Don Turnbull			
1931	(Australia) Jack Purcell (Australia) Bert Tonkin			
1932	(Australia) Adrian Quist (Australia) Leonard Schwartz			
1933	(Australia) Jack Purcell (Australia) Bert Tonkin			
1934	(Australia) Neil Ennis (Australia) Colin McKenzie			
1935	(Australia) John Bromwich (Australia) Arthur Huxley			
1936	(Australia) John Gilchrist (Australia) Henry Lindo			
1937	(Australia) John Bromwich (Australia) Dinny Pails			
1938	(Australia) Dinny Pails (Australia) Bill Sidwell			
1939	(Australia) Roy Felan (Australia) Harold Impey			
1940	(Australia) William Edwards (Australia) Dinny Pails			
1941- 1945	no competition, World War II break			
1946	(Australia) Frank Herringe (Australia) George Worthington			
1947	(Australia) Rex Hartwig (Australia) Allan Kendall			
1948	(Australia) Don Candy (Australia) Ken McGregor			
1949	(Australia) John Blacklock (Australia) Clive Wilderspin			
1950	(Australia) Lew Hoad (Australia) Ken Rosewall			
1951	(Australia) Lew Hoad (Australia) Ken Rosewall			
1952	(Australia) Lew Hoad (Australia) Ken Rosewall			
1953	(Australia) Bill Gilmour Sr. (Australia) Warren Woodcock			
1954	(Australia) Mal Anderson (Australia) Roy Emerson			
1955	(United States) Michael Green (United States) Gerry Moss			
1956	(Australia) Paul Hearnden (Australia) Bob Mark			
1957	(Australia) Frank Gorman (Australia) Rod Laver			
1958	(Australia) Bob Hewitt (Australia) Martin Mulligan			
1959	(Spain) José Luis Arilla (United States) Butch Buchholz			
1960	(Australia) Greg Hughes (Australia) Jim Shepherd			
1961	(Australia) Rod Brent (Australia) John Newcombe			
1962	(Australia) William Bowrey (Australia) Geoffrey Knox			
1963	(Australia) Robert Brien (Australia) John Cotterill			
1964	(United Kingdom) Stanley Matthews (United Kingdom) Graham Stilwell			
1965	(Australia) Terence Musgrave (Australia) John Walker			
1966	(Australia) Robert Layton (Australia) Pat McCumstie			
1967	(Australia) John Bartlett (Sweden) Sven Ginman			
1968	(Australia) Phil Dent (Australia) Bill Lloyd			
1969	(Australia) Neil Higgins (Australia) John James			
1970	(Australia) Allan McDonald (Australia) Greg Perkins			
1971	(Australia) John Marks (Australia) Michael Phillips			
1972	(Australia) Bill Durham (Australia) Steve Myers			
1973	(Australia) Terry Saunders (Australia) Graham Thoroughgood			
1974	(Australia) David Carter (Australia) Trevor Little			
1975	(Australia) Glenn Busby (Australia) Warren Maher			
1976	(Australia) Charlie Fancutt (Australia) Peter McCarthy			
1977	(Australia) Phil Davies (Australia) Peter Smylie (January) (Australia) Ray Kelly (Australia) Graham Thams (December)			
1978	(Australia) Michael Fancutt (Australia) Bill Gilmour Jr.			
1979	(Australia) Michael Fancutt (Australia) Greg Whitecross			
1980	(Australia) Craig Miller (Australia) Wally Masur			
1981	(New Zealand) David Lewis (Australia) Tony Withers	(South Africa) Barry Moir (South Africa) Michael Robertson		
1982	(Australia) Brendan Burke (Australia) Mark Hartnett	(Australia) Pat Cash (Australia) John Frawley	(Australia) Pat Cash (Australia) John Frawley	(United States) Jonathan Canter (United States) Michael Kures
1983	(Australia) Jamie Harty (Australia) Des Tyson	(Australia) Mark Kratzmann (Australia) Simon Youl	(Australia) Mark Kratzmann (Australia) Simon Youl	(Australia) Mark Kratzmann (Australia) Simon Youl
1984	(Australia) Mike Baroch (Australia) Mark Kratzmann	(United States) Luke Jensen (United States) Patrick McEnroe	(United States) Ricky Brown (United States) Robbie Weiss	(Mexico) Leonardo Lavalle (Romania) Mihnea Năstase
1985	(Australia) Brett Custer (Australia) David Macpherson	(Czechoslovakia) Petr Korda (Czechoslovakia) Cyril Suk	(Mexico) Agustín Moreno (Peru) Jaime Yzaga	(United States) Joey Blake (United States) Darren Yates
1986	No tournament	(Argentina) Franco Davín (Argentina) Guillermo Pérez	(Spain) Tomás Carbonell (Czechoslovakia) Petr Korda	(Spain) Tomás Carbonell (Spain) Javier Sánchez
1987	(Australia) Jason Stoltenberg (Australia) Todd Woodbridge	(United States) Jim Courier (United States) Jonathan Stark	(Australia) Jason Stoltenberg (Australia) Todd Woodbridge	(Socialist Federal Republic of Yugoslavia) Goran Ivanišević (Italy) Diego Nargiso
1988	(Australia) Jason Stoltenberg (Australia) Todd Woodbridge	(Australia) Jason Stoltenberg (Australia) Todd Woodbridge	(Australia) Jason Stoltenberg (Australia) Todd Woodbridge	(United States) Jonathan Stark (United States) John Yancey
1989	(Australia) Johan Anderson (Australia) Todd Woodbridge	(Australia) Johan Anderson (Australia) Todd Woodbridge	(United States) Jared Palmer (United States) Jonathan Stark	(South Africa) Wayne Ferreira (South Africa) Grant Stafford
1990	(Sweden) Roger Pettersson (Sweden) Mårten Renström	(Canada) Sébastien Lareau (Canada) Sébastien Leblanc	(Canada) Sébastien Lareau (Canada) Sébastien Leblanc	(Canada) Sébastien Leblanc (Canada) Greg Rusedski
1991	(Australia) Grant Doyle (Australia) Joshua Eagle	(Sweden) Thomas Enqvist (Sweden) Magnus Martinelle	(Morocco) Karim Alami (Canada) Greg Rusedski	(Morocco) Karim Alami (United States) John-Laffnie de Jager
1992	(Australia) Grant Doyle (Australia) Brad Sceney	(Mexico) Enrique Abaroa (Australia) Grant Doyle	(Australia) Steven Baldas (Australia) Scott Draper	(United States) Jimmy Jackson (United States) Eric Taino
1993	(Germany) Lars Rehmann (Germany) Christian Tambue	(New Zealand) Steven Downs (New Zealand) James Greenhalgh	(New Zealand) Steven Downs (New Zealand) James Greenhalgh	(South Africa) Neville Godwin (South Africa) Gareth Williams
1994	(Australia) Ben Ellwood (Australia) Mark Philippoussis	(Brazil) Gustavo Kuerten (Ecuador) Nicolás Lapentti	(Australia) Ben Ellwood (Australia) Mark Philippoussis	(Australia) Ben Ellwood (Ecuador) Nicolás Lapentti
1995	(Australia) Luke Bourgeois (South Korea) Lee Jong-min	(Netherlands) Raemon Sluiter (Netherlands) Peter Wessels	(United Kingdom) Martin Lee (United Kingdom) James Trotman	(South Korea) Lee Jong-min (Canada) Jocelyn Robichaud
1996	(Italy) Daniele Bracciali (Canada) Jocelyn Robichaud	(France) Sébastien Grosjean (France) Olivier Mutis	(Italy) Daniele Bracciali (Canada) Jocelyn Robichaud	(United States) Bob Bryan (United States) Mike Bryan
1997	(United Kingdom) David Sherwood (United Kingdom) James Trotman	(Venezuela) José de Armas (Peru) Luis Horna	(Peru) Luis Horna (Chile) Nicolás Massú	(Chile) Nicolás Massú (Chile) Fernando González
1998	(France) Julien Jeanpierre (France) Jérôme Haehnel	(Venezuela) José de Armas (Chile) Fernando González	(Switzerland) Roger Federer (Belgium) Olivier Rochus	(United States) K. J. Hippensteel (United States) David Martin
1999	(Austria) Jürgen Melzer (Denmark) Kristian Pless	(Georgia (country)) Irakli Labadze (Croatia) Lovro Zovko	(Argentina) Guillermo Coria (Argentina) David Nalbandian	(France) Julien Benneteau (France) Nicolas Mahut
2000	(France) Nicolas Mahut (Spain) Tommy Robredo	(Spain) Marc López (Spain) Tommy Robredo	(Belgium) Dominique Coene (Belgium) Kristof Vliegen	(United Kingdom) Lee Childs (United Kingdom) James Nelson
2001	(United States) Ytai Abougzir (Argentina) Luciano Vitullo	(Colombia) Alejandro Falla (Colombia) Carlos Salamanca	(Canada) Frank Dancevic (Ecuador) Giovanni Lapentti	(Czech Republic) Tomáš Berdych (Switzerland) Stéphane Bohli
2002	(Australia) Ryan Henry (Australia) Todd Reid	(Germany) Markus Bayer (Germany) Philipp Petzschner	(Romania) Florin Mergea (Romania) Horia Tecău	(Netherlands) Michel Koning (Netherlands) Bas van der Valk
2003	(United States) Scott Oudsema (United States) Phillip Simmonds	(Hungary) György Balázs (Israel) Dudi Sela	(Romania) Florin Mergea (Romania) Horia Tecău	cancelled due to inclement weather
2004	(United States) Brendan Evans (United States) Scott Oudsema	(Spain) Pablo Andújar (Spain) Marcel Granollers	(United States) Brendan Evans (United States) Scott Oudsema	(United States) Brendan Evans (United States) Scott Oudsema
2005	(South Korea) Kim Sun-yong (Chinese Taipei) Yi Chu-huan	(Argentina) Emiliano Massa (Argentina) Leonardo Mayer	(United States) Jesse Levine (United States) Michael Shabaz	(United States) Alex Clayton (United States) Donald Young
2006	(Poland) Błażej Koniusz (Poland) Grzegorz Panfil	(Argentina) Emiliano Massa (Japan) Kei Nishikori	(United States) Kellen Damico (United States) Nathaniel Schnugg	(United States) Jamie Hunt (United States) Nathaniel Schnugg
2007	(United Kingdom) Graeme Dyce (Finland) Harri Heliövaara	(Belarus) Andrei Karatchenia (Italy) Thomas Fabbiano	(Paraguay) Daniel Lopez (Italy) Matteo Trevisan	(France) Jonathan Eysseric (France) Jérôme Inzerillo
2008	(Chinese Taipei) Hsieh Cheng-peng (Chinese Taipei) Yang Tsung-hua	(Finland) Henri Kontinen (Indonesia) Christopher Rungkat	(Chinese Taipei) Hsieh Cheng-peng (Chinese Taipei) Yang Tsung-hua	(Austria) Nikolaus Moser (Germany) Cedrik-Marcel Stebe
2009	(Philippines) Francis Alcantara (Chinese Taipei) Hsieh Cheng-peng	(Croatia) Marin Draganja (Croatia) Dino Marcan	(France) Pierre-Hugues Herbert (Germany) Kevin Krawietz	(Hungary) Márton Fucsovics (Chinese Taipei) Hsieh Cheng-peng
2010	(Netherlands) Justin Eleveld (Netherlands) Jannick Lupescu	(Peru) Duilio Beretta (Ecuador) Roberto Quiroz	(United Kingdom) Liam Broady (United Kingdom) Tom Farquharson	(Peru) Duilio Beretta (Ecuador) Roberto Quiroz
2011	(Slovakia) Filip Horanský (Czech Republic) Jiří Veselý	(Spain) Andrés Artuñedo (Spain) Roberto Carballés Baena	(United Kingdom) George Morgan (Croatia) Mate Pavić	(Germany) Julian Lenz (Germany) Robin Kern
2012	(United Kingdom) Liam Broady (United Kingdom) Joshua Ward-Hibbert	(Australia) Andrew Harris (Australia) Nick Kyrgios	(Australia) Andrew Harris (Australia) Nick Kyrgios	(United Kingdom) Kyle Edmund (Portugal) Frederico Ferreira Silva
2013	(Australia) Jay Andrijic (Australia) Bradley Mousley	(United Kingdom) Kyle Edmund (Portugal) Frederico Ferreira Silva	(Australia) Thanasi Kokkinakis (Australia) Nick Kyrgios	(Poland) Kamil Majchrzak (United States) Martin Redlicki
2014	(Austria) Lucas Miedler (Australia) Bradley Mousley	(France) Benjamin Bonzi (France) Quentin Halys	(Brazil) Orlando Luz (Brazil) Marcelo Zormann	(Australia) Omar Jasika (Japan) Naoki Nakagawa
2015	(Australia) Jake Delaney (Australia) Marc Polmans	(Spain) Álvaro López San Martín (Spain) Jaume Munar	(Vietnam) Lý Hoàng Nam (India) Sumit Nagal	(Canada) Félix Auger-Aliassime (Canada) Denis Shapovalov
2016	(Australia) Alex de Minaur (Australia) Blake Ellis	(Israel) Yshai Oliel (Czech Republic) Patrik Rikl	(Estonia) Kenneth Raisma (Greece) Stefanos Tsitsipas	(Bolivia) Juan Carlos Aguilar (Brazil) Felipe Meligeni Alves
2017	(Chinese Taipei) Hsu Yu-hsiou (China) Zhao Lingxi	(Spain) Nicola Kuhn (Hungary) Zsombor Piros	(Argentina) Axel Geller (Chinese Taipei) Hsu Yu-hsiou	(Chinese Taipei) Hsu Yu-hsiou (China) Wu Yibing
2018	(France) Hugo Gaston (France) Clément Tabur	(Czech Republic) Ondřej Štyler (Japan) Naoki Tajima	(Turkey) Yankı Erel (Finland) Otto Virtanen	(Bulgaria) Adrian Andreev (United Kingdom) Anton Matusevich
2019	(Czech Republic) Jonáš Forejtek (Czech Republic) Dalibor Svrčina	(Brazil) Matheus Pucinelli de Almeida (Argentina) Thiago Agustín Tirante	(Czech Republic) Jonáš Forejtek (Czech Republic) Jiří Lehečka	(United States) Eliot Spizzirri (United States) Tyler Zink
2020	(Romania) Nicholas David Ionel (Switzerland) Leandro Riedi	(Italy) Flavio Cobolli (Switzerland) Dominic Stricker	no competition, COVID-19 pandemic	not played
2021	not played	(France) Arthur Fils (France) Giovanni Mpetshi Perricard	(Lithuania) Edas Butvilas (Spain) Alejandro Manzanera Pertusa	(France) Max Westphal (Hong Kong) Coleman Wong
2022	(United States) Bruno Kuzuhara (Hong Kong) Coleman Wong	(Lithuania) Edas Butvilas (Croatia) Mili Poljičak	(United States) Sebastian Gorzny (United States) Alex Michelsen	(United States) Ozan Baris (United States) Nishesh Basavareddy
2023	(United States) Learner Tien (United States) Cooper Williams	Yaroslav Demin (Mexico) Rodrigo Pacheco Méndez	(Czech Republic) Jakub Filip (Italy) Gabriele Vulpitta	(Sweden) Max Dahlin (Estonia) Oliver Ojakäär
2024	(United States) Maxwell Exsted (United States) Cooper Woestendick	(Norway) Nicolai Budkov Kjær (Austria) Joel Schwärzler	(United States) Alexander Razeghi (Germany) Max Schönhaus	(Czech Republic) Maxim Mrva (Japan) Rei Sakamoto
2025	(United States) Maxwell Exsted (Czech Republic) Jan Kumstát	(Finland) Oskari Paldanius (Poland) Alan Ważny	(Finland) Oskari Paldanius (Poland) Alan Ważny	(United States) Keaton Hance (United States) Jack Kennedy
2026	(South Africa) Connor Doig (Bulgaria) Dimitar Kisimov	(Germany) Jamie Mackenzie (Germany) Vincent Reisach	(Brazil) Luís Guto Miguel (Slovenia) Žiga Šeško	(France) Aaron Gabet (Spain) Valentín González-Galiño

Legend
Player/Team won all 4 Grand Slam tournaments in the same year
Player/Team won 3 Grand Slam tournaments in the same year
Player/Team won 2 Grand Slam tournaments in the same year

== Statistics ==
=== Most Grand Slam doubles titles ===
Note: when a tie, the person to reach the mark first is listed first.

Titles	Players
7	(Australia) Woodbridge
5	(Australia) Stoltenberg
4	(Australia) Crawford, (Australia) Kratzmann, (United States) Oudsema, (Chinese Taipei) Hsieh

=== Career Grand Slam ===
Players who won all four Grand Slam titles over the course of their careers.

- The event at which the Career Grand Slam was completed indicated in bold

Player	Australian Open	French Open	Wimbledon	US Open
(Australia) Mark Kratzmann	**1984**	1983	1983	1983

=== Three titles in a single season ===
Key
**W**	F	SF	QF	#R	RR	Q#	DNQ	A	NH

(W) winner; (F) finalist; (SF) semifinalist; (QF) quarterfinalist; (#R) rounds 4, 3, 2, 1; (RR) round-robin stage; (Q#) qualification round; (DNQ) did not qualify; (A) absent; (NH) not held; (SR) strike rate (events won / competed); (W–L) win–loss record.

Player(s)	Year	Australian Open	French Open	Wimbledon	US Open
(Australia) Mark Kratzmann	1983	1R	**W**	W	**W**
(Australia) Simon Youl	1983	1R	**W**	W	**W**
(Australia) Jason Stoltenberg	1988	**W**	**W**	W	QF
(Australia) Todd Woodbridge	1988	**W**	**W**	W	QF
(Canada) Sébastien Leblanc	1990	A	**W**	W	**W**
(Australia) Ben Ellwood	1994	**W**	SF	W	**W**
(United States) Brendan Evans	2004	**W**	SF	W	**W**
(United States) Scott Oudsema	2004	**W**	SF	W	**W**
(Chinese Taipei) Hsu Yu-hsiou	2017	**W**	2R	W	**W**

=== Surface Slam ===
Players who won Grand Slam titles on clay, grass and hard courts in a calendar year.

Player	Year	Clay court slam	Hard court slam	Grass court slam
(Australia) Mark Kratzmann	1983	French Open	US Open	Wimbledon
(Australia) Simon Youl	1983	French Open	US Open	Wimbledon
(Australia) Jason Stoltenberg	1988	French Open	Australian Open	Wimbledon
(Australia) Todd Woodbridge	1988	French Open	Australian Open	Wimbledon
(Canada) Sébastien Leblanc	1990	French Open	US Open	Wimbledon

=== Career Surface Slam ===
Players who won Grand Slam titles on clay, grass and hard courts iover the course of their careers.

- The event at which the Career Surface Slam was completed indicated in **bold**

==== Individual ====
Player	Clay court slam	Hard court slam	Grass court slam
(Australia) Mark Kratzmann	1983 French Open	**1983 US Open**	1983 Wimbledon
(Australia) Simon Youl	1983 French Open	**1983 US Open**	1983 Wimbledon
(Australia) Jason Stoltenberg	**1988 French Open**	1988 Australian Open	1987 Australian Open
(Australia) Todd Woodbridge	**1988 French Open**	1988 Australian Open	1987 Australian Open
(Australia) Todd Woodbridge (2)	**1989 French Open**	1989 Australian Open	1987 Wimbledon
(United States) Jonathan Stark	1987 French Open	1988 US Open	**1989 Wimbledon**
(Canada) Sébastien Leblanc	1990 French Open	**1990 US Open**	1990 Wimbledon

==== Team ====
Player	Clay court slam	Hard court slam	Grass court slam
(Australia) Mark Kratzmann (Australia) Simon Youl	1983 French Open	**1983 US Open**	1983 Wimbledon
(Australia) Jason Stoltenberg (Australia) Todd Woodbridge	**1988 French Open**	1988 Australian Open	1987 Australian Open

=== Channel Slam ===
Players who won the French Open-Wimbledon double.

Year	Player
1982	(Australia) John Frawley
1982	(Australia) Pat Cash
1983	(Australia) Mark Kratzmann
1983	(Australia) Simon Youl
1988	(Australia) Jason Stoltenberg
1988	(Australia) Todd Woodbridge
1990	(Canada) Sébastien Lareau
1990	(Canada) Sébastien Leblanc
1993	(Australia) James Greenhalgh
1993	(Australia) Steven Downs
1997	(Peru) Luis Horna
2012	(Australia) Andrew Harris
2012	(Australia) Nick Kyrgios
2025	(Finland) Oskari Paldanius
2025	(Poland) Alan Ważny

== Sources ==
- ITF Australian Open
- ITF Roland Garros
- ITF Wimbledon
- ITF US Open

== See also ==
- List of Grand Slam boys' singles champions
- List of Grand Slam girls' singles champions
- List of Grand Slam girls' doubles champions
- Tennis statistics
