= List of tennis players career achievements =

This is a list of records and achievements of professional tennis players from the Open Era only.

== See also ==
- All-time tennis records – Men's singles
- All-time tennis records – Women's singles
- Open Era tennis records – Men's singles
- Open Era tennis records – Women's singles
- ATP Tour records
- WTA Tour records
- List of Grand Slam–related tennis records
- Tennis Masters Series records and statistics
