= List of Grand Slam girls' singles champions =

List of Girls' Singles Junior Grand Slam tournaments tennis champions.

Many of these junior champions went on to become major champions and world No. 1s on the senior tour including Evonne Goolagong Cawley (world No. 1 and 8-time major champion), Sue Barker (1976 French Open champion), Mima Jaušovec (1977 French Open champion), Chris O'Neil (1978 Australian Open champion), Tracy Austin (world No. 1 and 2-time US Open champion), Hana Mandlikova (4-time major champion), Gabriela Sabatini (1990 US Open champion), Jennifer Capriati (world No. 1 and 3-time major champion), Lindsay Davenport (world No. 1 and 3-time major champion), Martina Hingis (world No. 1 and 5-time major champion), Amélie Mauresmo (world No. 1 and 2-time major champion), Justine Henin (world No. 1 and 7-time major champion), Jelena Jankovic (world No. 1), Marion Bartoli (2013 Wimbledon champion), Victoria Azarenka (world No. 1 and 2-time Australian Open champion), Jeļena Ostapenko (2017 French Open champion), Caroline Wozniacki (world No. 1 and 2018 Australian Open champion), Simona Halep (world No. 1 and 2-time major champion), Ashleigh Barty (world No. 1 and 3-time major champion), Iga Świątek (world No. 1 and 6-time major champion), and Coco Gauff (world No. 2, world No. 1 in doubles, 2-time major champion.)

Other notable names who were successful on the tour were Zina Garrison (world No. 4 and 1990 Wimbledon finalist), Natasha Zvereva (1988 French Open finalist and world No. 1 in doubles), Magdalena Maleeva (world No. 4), Cara Black (world No. 1 and 10-time major champion in doubles and mixed doubles), Nadia Petrova (world No. 3 and 2-time major semifinalist), Agnieszka Radwańska (world No. 2 and 2012 Wimbledon finalist), Karolína Plíšková (world No. 1 and 2-time major finalist), Eugenie Bouchard (world No. 5 and 2014 Wimbledon finalist), Elina Svitolina (world No. 3), Ons Jabeur (world No. 2 and 3-time major finalist), Anastasia Pavlyuchenkova (world No. 11 and 2021 French Open finalist), Paula Badosa (world No. 2), Daria Kasatkina (world No. 8 and 2022 French Open semifinalist), Maria Kirilenko (world No. 10 and Olympic medallist), and Kristina Mladenovic (world No. 10, doubles world No. 1, 9-time major doubles champion).

== Champions by year ==
Year	Australian Open	French Open	Wimbledon	US Open
1930	(Australia) Emily Hood	started in 1953	started in 1947	started in 1974
1931	(Australia) Joan Hartigan	started in 1953	started in 1947	started in 1974
1932	(Australia) Nancy Lewis	started in 1953	started in 1947	started in 1974
1933	(Australia) Nancy Lewis	started in 1953	started in 1947	started in 1974
1934	(Australia) May Blick	started in 1953	started in 1947	started in 1974
1935	(Australia) Thelma Coyne	started in 1953	started in 1947	started in 1974
1936	(Australia) Thelma Coyne	started in 1953	started in 1947	started in 1974
1937	(Australia) Margaret Wilson	started in 1953	started in 1947	started in 1974
1938	(Australia) Joyce Wood	started in 1953	started in 1947	started in 1974
1939	(Australia) Joyce Wood	started in 1953	started in 1947	started in 1974
1940	(Australia) Joyce Wood	started in 1953	started in 1947	started in 1974
1941- 1945	no competition, World War II	started in 1953	started in 1947	started in 1974
1946	(Australia) Shirley Grant	started in 1953	started in 1947	started in 1974
1947	(Australia) Joan Tuckfield	started in 1953	(Belgium) Geneviève Domken	started in 1974
1948	(Australia) Beryl Penrose	started in 1953	(Czechoslovakia) Olga Mišková	started in 1974
1949	(Australia) Judy Warnock	started in 1953	(Belgium) Christiane Mercelis	started in 1974
1950	(Australia) Barbara McIntyre	started in 1953	(United Kingdom) Lorna Cornell	started in 1974
1951	(Australia) Mary Carter	started in 1953	(United Kingdom) Lorna Cornell	started in 1974
1952	(Australia) Mary Carter	started in 1953	(Netherlands) Fenny ten Bosch	started in 1974
1953	(Australia) Jenny Staley	(France) Christine Brunon	(South Africa) Dora Kilan	started in 1974
1954	(Australia) Elizabeth Orton	(France) Beatrice de Chambure	(United Kingdom) Valerie Pitt	started in 1974
1955	(Australia) Elizabeth Orton	(Italy) Maria Teresa Riedl	(United Kingdom) Sheila Armstrong	started in 1974
1956	(Australia) Lorraine Coghlan	(France) Eliane Launay	(United Kingdom) Ann Haydon	started in 1974
1957	(Australia) Margot Rayson	(West Germany) Ilse Buding	(United States) Miriam Arnold	started in 1974
1958	(Australia) Jan Lehane	(Italy) Francesca Gordigiani	(United States) Sally Moore	started in 1974
1959	(Australia) Jan Lehane	(South Africa) Joan Cross	(South Africa) Joan Cross	started in 1974
1960	(Australia) Lesley Turner	(France) Françoise Dürr	(United States) Karen Hantze	started in 1974
1961	(Australia) Robyn Ebbern	(Australia) Robyn Ebbern	(Soviet Union) Galina Baksheeva	started in 1974
1962	(Australia) Robyn Ebbern	(Australia) Kaye Dening	(Soviet Union) Galina Baksheeva	started in 1974
1963	(Australia) Robyn Ebbern	(France) Monique Salfati	(France) Monique Salfati	started in 1974
1964	(Australia) Kaye Dening	(France) Nicole Seghers	(United States) Peaches Bartkowicz	started in 1974
1965	(Australia) Kerry Melville	(South Africa) Esmé Emmanuel	(Soviet Union) Olga Morozova	started in 1974
1966	(Australia) Karen Krantzcke	(France) Odile de Roubin	(Finland) Birgitta Lindström	started in 1974
1967	(Australia) Lexie Kenny	(United Kingdom) Corinne Molesworth	(Netherlands) Judith Salomé	started in 1974
1968	(Australia) Lesley Hunt	(Australia) Lesley Hunt	(United States) Kristy Pigeon	started in 1974
1969	(Australia) Lesley Hunt	(Japan) Kazuko Sawamatsu	(Japan) Kazuko Sawamatsu	started in 1974
1970	(Australia) Evonne Goolagong	(United Kingdom) Veronica Burton	(United States) Sharon Walsh	started in 1974
1971	(Australia) Pat Coleman	(Soviet Union) Yelena Granaturova	(Soviet Union) Marina Kroschina	started in 1974
1972	(Australia) Pat Coleman	(Czechoslovakia) Renáta Tomanová	(South Africa) Ilana Kloss	started in 1974
1973	(Australia) Chris O'Neil	(Socialist Federal Republic of Yugoslavia) Mima Jaušovec	(United States) Ann Kiyomura	started in 1974
1974	(Australia) Jennifer Walker	(Romania) Mariana Simionescu	(Socialist Federal Republic of Yugoslavia) Mima Jaušovec	(South Africa) Ilana Kloss
1975	(United Kingdom) Sue Barker	(Czechoslovakia) Regina Maršíková	(Soviet Union) Natasha Chmyreva	(Soviet Union) Natasha Chmyreva
1976	(Australia) Sue Saliba	(United Kingdom) Michelle Tyler	(Soviet Union) Natasha Chmyreva	(South Africa) Marise Kruger
1977	(Australia) Pamela Baily (Jan) (Australia) Amanda Tobin (Dec)	(United States) Anne Smith	(United States) Lea Antonoplis	(Argentina) Claudia Casabianca
1978	(Australia) Elizabeth Little	(Czechoslovakia) Hana Mandlíková	(United States) Tracy Austin	(United States) Linda Siegel
1979	(Australia) Anne Minter	(Sweden) Lena Sandin	(United States) Mary-Lou Piatek	(United States) Alycia Moulton
1980	(Australia) Anne Minter	(United States) Kathy Horvath	(Australia) Debbie Freeman	(United States) Susan Mascarin
1981	(Australia) Anne Minter	(United States) Bonnie Gadusek	(United States) Zina Garrison	(United States) Zina Garrison
1982	(United Kingdom) Amanda Brown	(Bulgaria) Manuela Maleeva	(France) Catherine Tanvier	(United States) Beth Herr
1983	(United Kingdom) Amanda Brown	(France) Pascale Paradis	(France) Pascale Paradis	(Australia) Elizabeth Minter
1984	(United Kingdom) Annabel Croft	(Argentina) Gabriela Sabatini	(United Kingdom) Annabel Croft	(Bulgaria) Katerina Maleeva
1985	(Australia) Jenny Byrne	(Italy) Laura Garrone	(Czechoslovakia) Andrea Holíková	(Italy) Laura Garrone
1986	no competition	(Argentina) Patricia Tarabini	(Soviet Union) Natasha Zvereva	(United States) Elly Hakami
1987	(Australia) Michelle Jaggard	(Soviet Union) Natasha Zvereva	(Soviet Union) Natasha Zvereva	(Soviet Union) Natasha Zvereva
1988	(Australia) Jo-Anne Faull	(France) Julie Halard	(Netherlands) Brenda Schultz	(United States) Carrie Cunningham
1989	(United States) Kim Kessaris	(United States) Jennifer Capriati	(Czechoslovakia) Andrea Strnadová	(United States) Jennifer Capriati
1990	(Bulgaria) Magdalena Maleeva	(Bulgaria) Magdalena Maleeva	(Czechoslovakia) Andrea Strnadová	(Bulgaria) Magdalena Maleeva
1991	(Australia) Nicole Pratt	(Israel) Anna Smashnova	(Germany) Barbara Rittner	(Czechoslovakia) Karina Habšudová
1992	(Australia) Joanne Limmer	(Paraguay) Rossana de los Ríos	(United States) Chanda Rubin	(United States) Lindsay Davenport
1993	(Germany) Heike Rusch	(Switzerland) Martina Hingis	(Belgium) Nancy Feber	(Italy) Maria Bentivoglio
1994	(Australia) Trudi Musgrave	(Switzerland) Martina Hingis	(Switzerland) Martina Hingis	(United States) Meilen Tu
1995	(Australia) Siobhan Drake-Brockman	(France) Amélie Cocheteux	(Poland) Aleksandra Olsza	(United States) Tara Snyder
1996	(Poland) Magdalena Grzybowska	(France) Amélie Mauresmo	(France) Amélie Mauresmo	(Croatia) Mirjana Lučić
1997	(Croatia) Mirjana Lučić	(Belgium) Justine Henin	(Zimbabwe) Cara Black	(Zimbabwe) Cara Black
1998	(Croatia) Jelena Kostanić	(Russia) Nadia Petrova	(Slovenia) Katarina Srebotnik	(Australia) Jelena Dokic
1999	(France) Virginie Razzano	(Spain) Lourdes Domínguez Lino	(Uzbekistan) Iroda Tulyaganova	(Russia) Lina Krasnoroutskaya
2000	(Hungary) Anikó Kapros	(France) Virginie Razzano	(Argentina) María Emilia Salerni	(Argentina) María Emilia Salerni
2001	(Serbia and Montenegro) Jelena Janković	(Estonia) Kaia Kanepi	(Indonesia) Angelique Widjaja	(France) Marion Bartoli
2002	(Czech Republic) Barbora Strýcová	(Indonesia) Angelique Widjaja	(Russia) Vera Dushevina	(Russia) Maria Kirilenko
2003	(Czech Republic) Barbora Strýcová	(Germany) Anna-Lena Grönefeld	(Belgium) Kirsten Flipkens	(Belgium) Kirsten Flipkens
2004	(Israel) Shahar Pe'er	(Bulgaria) Sesil Karatantcheva	(Ukraine) Kateryna Bondarenko	(Netherlands) Michaëlla Krajicek
2005	(Belarus) Victoria Azarenka	(Hungary) Ágnes Szávay	(Poland) Agnieszka Radwańska	(Belarus) Victoria Azarenka
2006	(Russia) Anastasia Pavlyuchenkova	(Poland) Agnieszka Radwańska	(Denmark) Caroline Wozniacki	(Russia) Anastasia Pavlyuchenkova
2007	(Russia) Anastasia Pavlyuchenkova	(France) Alizé Cornet	(Poland) Urszula Radwańska	(Slovakia) Kristína Kučová
2008	(Netherlands) Arantxa Rus	(Romania) Simona Halep	(United Kingdom) Laura Robson	(United States) CoCo Vandeweghe
2009	(Russia) Ksenia Pervak	(France) Kristina Mladenovic	(Thailand) Noppawan Lertcheewakarn	(United Kingdom) Heather Watson
2010	(Czech Republic) Karolína Plíšková	(Ukraine) Elina Svitolina	(Czech Republic) Kristýna Plíšková	(Russia) Daria Gavrilova
2011	(Belgium) An-Sophie Mestach	(Tunisia) Ons Jabeur	(Australia) Ashleigh Barty	(United States) Grace Min
2012	(United States) Taylor Townsend	(Germany) Annika Beck	(Canada) Eugenie Bouchard	(United States) Samantha Crawford
2013	(Croatia) Ana Konjuh	(Switzerland) Belinda Bencic	(Switzerland) Belinda Bencic	(Croatia) Ana Konjuh
2014	(Russia) Elizaveta Kulichkova	(Russia) Daria Kasatkina	(Latvia) Jeļena Ostapenko	(Czech Republic) Marie Bouzková
2015	(Slovakia) Tereza Mihalíková	(Spain) Paula Badosa	(Russia) Sofya Zhuk	(Hungary) Dalma Gálfi
2016	(Belarus) Vera Lapko	(Switzerland) Rebeka Masarova	(Russia) Anastasia Potapova	(United States) Kayla Day
2017	(Ukraine) Marta Kostyuk	(United States) Whitney Osuigwe	(United States) Claire Liu	(United States) Amanda Anisimova
2018	(Chinese Taipei) Liang En-shuo	(United States) Coco Gauff	(Poland) Iga Świątek	(China) Wang Xiyu
2019	(Denmark) Clara Tauson	(Canada) Leylah Fernandez	(Ukraine) Daria Snigur	(Colombia) Camila Osorio
2020	(Andorra) Victoria Jiménez Kasintseva	(France) Elsa Jacquemot	no competition, COVID-19 pandemic	not played
2021	not played	(Czech Republic) Linda Nosková	(Spain) Ane Mintegi del Olmo	(United States) Robin Montgomery
2022	(Croatia) Petra Marčinko	(Czech Republic) Lucie Havlíčková	(United States) Liv Hovde	(Philippines) Alex Eala
2023	(Note: On 1 March 2022, the WTA announced that players from Russia will not be allowed to compete under the name or flag of Russia following the 2022 Russian invasion of Ukraine.) Alina Korneeva	Alina Korneeva	(United States) Clervie Ngounoue	(United States) Katherine Hui
2024	(Slovakia) Renáta Jamrichová	(Czech Republic) Tereza Valentová	(Slovakia) Renáta Jamrichová	(United Kingdom) Mika Stojsavljevic
2025	(Japan) Wakana Sonobe	(Austria) Lilli Tagger	(Slovakia) Mia Pohánková	(Belgium) Jeline Vandromme
2026	(France) Ksenia Efremova	Alisa Oktiabreva	Anna Pushkareva	(China) Sun Xinran

=== Most Grand Slam singles titles ===
Note: when a tie, the person to reach the mark first is listed first.

Titles	Players
4	(Australia) Ebbern, (Soviet Union) Zvereva
3	(Australia) Wood, (Australia) Hunt, (Soviet Union) Chmyreva, (Australia) Minter, (Bulgaria) Maleeva, (Switzerland) Hingis, (Russia) Pavlyuchenkova

=== Grand Slam singles titles by country (since 1974) ===
28	United States

19	Australia

14	France

12	Great Britain

11	Russia

8	Czech Republic

6	Belgium, Bulgaria, Croatia, Czechoslovakia, Poland, Switzerland

5	Argentina, Slovakia

4	Germany, Netherlands, Soviet Union, Ukraine

3	Belarus, Hungary, Italy, Romania, Spain

2	Canada, China,Denmark, Indonesia, Israel, South Africa, Zimbabwe

1	Andorra, Austria, Chinese Taipei, Colombia, Estonia, Japan, Latvia, Paraguay, Philippines, Serbia and Montenegro, Slovenia, Sweden, Thailand, Tunisia, Uzbekistan, Yugoslavia

== Multiple titles in a season ==
=== Three titles in a single season ===
Player	Year	Australian Open	French Open	Wimbledon	US Open
(Soviet Union) Natasha Zvereva	1987	A	**W**	**W**	**W**
(Bulgaria) Magdalena Maleeva	1990	**W**	**W**	QF	**W**

=== Surface Slam ===
Players who won Grand Slam titles on clay, grass and hard courts in a calendar year.

Player	Year	Clay court slam	Hard court slam	Grass court slam
(Soviet Union) Natasha Zvereva	1987	French Open	US Open	Wimbledon

=== Career Surface Slam ===
Players who won Grand Slam titles on clay, grass and hard courts iover the course of their careers.

- The event at which the Career Surface Slam was completed indicated in **bold**

Player	Clay court slam	Hard court slam	Grass court slam
(Soviet Union) Natasha Zvereva	1987 French Open	**1987 US Open**	1986 Wimbledon

=== Channel Slam ===
Players who won the French Open-Wimbledon double.

Year	Player
1959	(South Africa) Joan Cross
1969	(Japan) Kazuko Sawamatsu
1983	(France) Pascale Paradis
1987	(Soviet Union) Natasha Zvereva
1994	(Switzerland) Martina Hingis
1996	(France) Amélie Mauresmo
2013	(Switzerland) Belinda Bencic

== See also ==
- List of Grand Slam boys' singles champions
- List of Grand Slam boys' doubles champions
- List of Grand Slam girls' doubles champions
