= List of Grand Slam girls' doubles champions =

List of Girls' Doubles Junior Grand Slam tournaments tennis champions:

== Champions by year ==
Year	Australian Open	French Open	Wimbledon	US Open
1930	(Australia) Emily Hood (Australia) Nell Hall	No tournament		
1931	(Australia) Emily Hood (Australia) Sadie Moon	No tournament		
1932	(Australia) Florrie Francisco (Australia) Joyce Williams	No tournament		
1933	(Australia) Gwen Stevenson (Australia) Dorothy Stevenson	No tournament		
1934	(Australia) Enid Chrystal (Australia) Edna McColl	No tournament		
1935	(Australia) Dorothy Stevenson (Australia) Nancye Wynne	No tournament		
1936	(Australia) Mary Carter (Australia) Margaret Wilson	No tournament		
1937	(Australia) Ida Webb (Australia) Joan Prior	No tournament		
1938	(Australia) Joyce Wood (Australia) Alison Burton	No tournament		
1939	(Australia) Joyce Wood (Australia) Alison Burton	No tournament		
1940	(Australia) Joyce Wood (Australia) Alison Burton	No tournament		
1941 -45	No tournament			
1946	(Australia) Helen Utz (Australia) Norma Reid	No tournament		
1947	(Australia) Veronica Linehan (Australia) Shirley Jackson	No tournament		
1948	(Australia) Beverley Bligh (Australia) Gloria Blair	No tournament		
1949	(Australia) Beryl Penrose (Australia) Jean Robbins	No tournament		
1950	(Australia) Pam Southcombe (Australia) Carmen Borelli	No tournament		
1951	(Australia) Margaret Wallis (Australia) Jennifer Staley	No tournament		
1952	(Australia) Mary Carter (Australia) Betty Holstein	No tournament		
1953	(Australia) Mary Carter (Australia) Barbara Warby	No tournament		
1954	(Australia) Beth Jones (Australia) Betty Holstein	No tournament		
1955	(Australia) Betty Orton (Australia) Pat Parmenter	No tournament		
1956	(United Kingdom) Sheila Armstrong (Australia) Lorraine Coghlan	No tournament		
1957	(Australia) Margo Rayson (Australia) Vale Roberts	No tournament		
1958	(Australia) Betty Holstein (Australia) Jan Lehane	No tournament		
1959	(Australia) Jan Lehane (Australia) Dawn Robberds	No tournament		
1960	(Australia) Lesley Turner (Australia) Dawn Robberds	No tournament		
1961	(Australia) Robyn Ebbern (Australia) Madonna Schacht	No tournament		
1962	(Australia) Heather Ross (Australia) Jill Star	No tournament		
1963	(Australia) Gail Sherriff (Australia) Patricia McClenaughan	No tournament		
1964	(Australia) Kaye Dening (Australia) Helen Gourlay	No tournament		
1965	(Australia) Helen Gourlay (Australia) Kerry Melville	No tournament		
1966	(Australia) Karen Krantzcke (Australia) Patricia Turner	No tournament		
1967	(Australia) Susan Alexander (Australia) Carol Cooper	No tournament		
1968	(Australia) Lesley Hunt (Australia) Vicky Lancaster	No tournament		
1969	(Australia) Patricia Edwards (Australia) Evonne Goolagong	No tournament		
1970	(Australia) Jan Fallis (Australia) Janet Young	No tournament		
1971	(Australia) Patricia Edwards (Australia) Janine Whyte	No tournament		
1972	(Australia) Sally Irvine (Australia) Pam Whytcross	No tournament		
1973	(Australia) Dianne Fromholtz (Australia) Jenny Dimond	No tournament		
1974	(Australia) Nerida Gregory (Australia) Jan Hanrahan	No tournament		
1975	(Australia) Dianne Evers (Australia) Nerida Gregory	No tournament		
1976	(Australia) Jan Morton (Australia) Jan Wilton	No tournament		
1977	(Australia) Kerryn Pratt (Australia) Amanda Tobin ^{(Jan)} (Australia) Kerryn Pratt (Australia) Amanda Tobin ^{(Dec)}	No tournament		
1978	(Australia) Debbie Freeman (Australia) Kathy Mantle	No tournament		
1979	(Australia) Linda Cassell (Australia) Sue Leo	No tournament		
1980	(Australia) Anne Minter (Australia) Miranda Yates	No tournament		
1981	(Australia) Maree Booth (Australia) Sharon Hodgkin	(France) Sophie Amiach (France) Corinne Vanier	No tournament	
1982	(Australia) Annette Gulley (Australia) Kim Staunton	(United States) Beth Herr (United States) Janet Lagasse	(United States) Penny Barg (United States) Beth Herr	(United States) Penny Barg (United States) Beth Herr
1983	(Australia) Bernadette Randall (Australia) Kim Staunton	(Sweden) Carin Anderholm (Sweden) Helena Olsson	(United States) Patty Fendick; Patricia Hy	(United States) Ann Hulbert (Australia) Bernadette Randall
1984	(Australia) Louise Field (Soviet Union) Larisa Savchenko	(Netherlands) Digna Ketelaar (Netherlands) Simone Schilder	(United States) Caroline Kuhlman (United States) Stephanie Rehe	(Argentina) Mercedes Paz (Argentina) Gabriela Sabatini
1985	(Australia) Jenny Byrne (Australia) Janine Thompson	(Argentina) Mariana Pérez (Argentina) Patricia Tarabini	(Australia) Louise Field (Australia) Janine Thompson	(Czechoslovakia) Andrea Holíková (Czechoslovakia) Radomira Zrubáková
1986	No tournament	(Soviet Union) Leila Meskhi (Soviet Union) Natalia Zvereva	(Australia) Michelle Jaggard (Australia) Lisa O'Neill	(Czechoslovakia) Jana Novotná (Czechoslovakia) Radomira Zrubáková
1987	(Belgium) Ann Devries (Australia) Nicole Provis	(Soviet Union) Natalia Medvedeva (Soviet Union) Natalia Zvereva	(Soviet Union) Natalia Medvedeva (Soviet Union) Natalia Zvereva	(United States) Meredith McGrath (United States) Kimberly Po
1988	(Australia) Jo-Anne Faull (Australia) Rachel McQuillan	(France) Alexia Dechaume (France) Emmanuelle Derly	(Australia) Jo-Anne Faull (Australia) Rachel McQuillan	(United States) Meredith McGrath (United States) Kimberly Po
1989	(Czechoslovakia) Andrea Strnadová (Czechoslovakia) Eva Švíglerová	(Australia) Nicole Pratt (Chinese Taipei) Wang Shi-ting	(United States) Jennifer Capriati (United States) Meredith McGrath	(United States) Jennifer Capriati (United States) Meredith McGrath
1990	(Israel) Rona Mayer (Israel) Limor Zaltz	(Romania) Ruxandra Dragomir (Romania) Irina Spîrlea	(Czechoslovakia) Karina Habšudová (Czechoslovakia) Andrea Strnadová	(Australia) Kristin Godridge (Australia) Nicole Pratt
1991	(Czechoslovakia) Karina Habšudová (Germany) Barbara Rittner	(Spain) Eva Bes (Argentina) Inés Gorrochategui	(Australia) Catherine Barclay (Israel) Limor Zaltz	(Australia) Kristin Godridge (Australia) Kirrily Sharpe
1992	(United States) Lindsay Davenport (United States) Nicole London	(Belgium) Laurence Courtois (Belgium) Nancy Feber	(Australia) Maija Avotins (Australia) Lisa McShea	(United States) Lindsay Davenport (United States) Nicole London
1993	(Switzerland) Joana Manta (Czech Republic) Ludmila Richterová	(Belgium) Laurence Courtois (Belgium) Nancy Feber	(Belgium) Laurence Courtois (Belgium) Nancy Feber	(United States) Nicole London (United States) Julie Steven
1994	(United States) Corina Morariu (Czech Republic) Ludmila Varmužová	(Switzerland) Martina Hingis (Slovakia) Henrieta Nagyová	(South Africa) Esmé de Villiers (United Kingdom) Elizabeth Jelfs	(South Africa) Surina De Beer (Netherlands) Chantal Reuter
1995	(United States) Corina Morariu (Czech Republic) Ludmila Varmužová	(United States) Corina Morariu (Czech Republic) Ludmila Varmužová	(Zimbabwe) Cara Black (Poland) Aleksandra Olsza	(United States) Corina Morariu (Czech Republic) Ludmila Varmužová
1996	(Czech Republic) Michaela Paštiková (Czech Republic) Jitka Schönfeldová	(Italy) Alice Canepa (Italy) Giulia Casoni	(Belarus) Olga Barabanschikova (France) Amélie Mauresmo	(South Africa) Surina De Beer (South Africa) Jessica Steck
1997	(Croatia) Mirjana Lučić (Germany) Jasmin Wöhr	(Zimbabwe) Cara Black (Kazakhstan) Irina Selyutina	(Zimbabwe) Cara Black (Kazakhstan) Irina Selyutina	(United States) Marissa Irvin (United States) Alexandra Stevenson
1998	(Australia) Evie Dominiković (Australia) Alicia Molik	(Belgium) Kim Clijsters (Australia) Jelena Dokic	(Denmark) Eva Dyrberg (Croatia) Jelena Kostanić	(Belgium) Kim Clijsters (Denmark) Eva Dyrberg
1999	(Greece) Eleni Daniilidou (France) Virginie Razzano	(Italy) Flavia Pennetta (Italy) Roberta Vinci	(Czech Republic) Daniela Bedáňová (Argentina) María Salerni	(Czech Republic) Daniela Bedáňová (Uzbekistan) Iroda Tulyaganova
2000	(Hungary) Anikó Kapros (Australia) Christina Wheeler	(Spain) María Martínez (Spain) Anabel Medina	(Romania) Ioana Gașpar (Ukraine) Tatiana Perebiynis	(Argentina) Gisela Dulko (Argentina) María Salerni
2001	(Czech Republic) Petra Cetkovská (Czech Republic) Barbora Strýcová	(Czech Republic) Petra Cetkovská (Czech Republic) Renata Voráčová	(Argentina) Gisela Dulko (United States) Ashley Harkleroad	(Russia) Galina Fokina (Russia) Svetlana Kuznetsova
2002	(Argentina) Gisela Dulko (Indonesia) Angelique Widjaja	(Germany) Anna-Lena Grönefeld (Czech Republic) Barbora Strýcová	(Belgium) Elke Clijsters (Czech Republic) Barbora Strýcová	(Belgium) Elke Clijsters (Belgium) Kirsten Flipkens
2003	(Australia) Casey Dellacqua (Australia) Adriana Szili	(Spain) Adriana González (Spain) Marta Fraga Pérez	(Russia) Alisa Kleybanova (India) Sania Mirza	cancelled due to inclement weather
2004	(Chinese Taipei) Chan Yung-jan (China) Sun Shengnan	(Czech Republic) Kateřina Böhmová (Netherlands) Michaëlla Krajicek	(Belarus) Victoria Azarenka (Belarus) Olga Govortsova	(New Zealand) Marina Eraković (Netherlands) Michaëlla Krajicek
2005	(Belarus) Victoria Azarenka (New Zealand) Marina Eraković	(Belarus) Victoria Azarenka (Hungary) Ágnes Szávay	(Belarus) Victoria Azarenka (Hungary) Ágnes Szávay	(Czech Republic) Nikola Fraňková (Russia) Alisa Kleybanova
2006	(Canada) Sharon Fichman (Russia) Anastasia Pavlyuchenkova	(Canada) Sharon Fichman (Russia) Anastasia Pavlyuchenkova	(Russia) Alisa Kleybanova (Russia) Anastasia Pavlyuchenkova	(Romania) Ioana Raluca Olaru (Romania) Mihaela Buzărnescu
2007	(Russia) Evgeniya Rodina (Russia) Arina Rodionova	(Belarus) Ksenia Milevskaya (Poland) Urszula Radwańska	(Russia) Anastasia Pavlyuchenkova (Poland) Urszula Radwańska	(Belarus) Ksenia Milevskaya (Poland) Urszula Radwańska
2008	(Russia) Ksenia Lykina (Russia) Anastasia Pavlyuchenkova	(Slovenia) Polona Hercog (Australia) Jessica Moore	(Slovenia) Polona Hercog (Australia) Jessica Moore	(Thailand) Noppawan Lertcheewakarn (Sweden) Sandra Roma
2009	(United States) Christina McHale (Croatia) Ajla Tomljanović	(Romania) Elena Bogdan (Thailand) Noppawan Lertcheewakarn	(Thailand) Noppawan Lertcheewakarn (Australia) Sally Peers	(Russia) Valeriya Solovyeva (Ukraine) Maryna Zanevska
2010	(Slovakia) Jana Čepelová (Slovakia) Chantal Škamlová	(Hungary) Tímea Babos (United States) Sloane Stephens	(Hungary) Tímea Babos (United States) Sloane Stephens	(Hungary) Tímea Babos (United States) Sloane Stephens
2011	(Belgium) An-Sophie Mestach (Netherlands) Demi Schuurs	(Russia) Irina Khromacheva (Ukraine) Maryna Zanevska	(Canada) Eugenie Bouchard (United States) Grace Min	(Russia) Irina Khromacheva (Netherlands) Demi Schuurs
2012	(United States) Gabrielle Andrews (United States) Taylor Townsend	(Russia) Daria Gavrilova (Russia) Irina Khromacheva	(Canada) Eugenie Bouchard (United States) Taylor Townsend	(United States) Gabrielle Andrews (United States) Taylor Townsend
2013	(Croatia) Ana Konjuh (Canada) Carol Zhao	(Czech Republic) Barbora Krejčíková (Czech Republic) Kateřina Siniaková	(Czech Republic) Barbora Krejčíková (Czech Republic) Kateřina Siniaková	(Czech Republic) Barbora Krejčíková (Czech Republic) Kateřina Siniaková
2014	(Ukraine) Anhelina Kalinina (Russia) Elizaveta Kulichkova	(Romania) Ioana Ducu (Romania) Ioana Loredana Roșca	(Indonesia) Tami Grende (China) Ye Qiuyu	(Turkey) İpek Soylu (Switzerland) Jil Teichmann
2015	(Czech Republic) Miriam Kolodziejová (Czech Republic) Markéta Vondroušová	(Czech Republic) Miriam Kolodziejová (Czech Republic) Markéta Vondroušová	(Hungary) Dalma Gálfi (Hungary) Fanny Stollár	(Slovakia) Viktória Kužmová (Russia) Aleksandra Pospelova
2016	(Russia) Anna Kalinskaya (Slovakia) Tereza Mihalíková	(Spain) Paula Arias Manjón (Serbia) Olga Danilović	(United States) Usue Maitane Arconada (United States) Claire Liu	(United States) Jada Hart (United States) Ena Shibahara
2017	(Canada) Bianca Andreescu (United States) Carson Branstine	(Canada) Bianca Andreescu (Canada) Carson Branstine	(Serbia) Olga Danilović (Slovenia) Kaja Juvan	(Serbia) Olga Danilović (Ukraine) Marta Kostyuk
2018	(Chinese Taipei) Liang En-shuo (China) Wang Xinyu	(United States) Caty McNally (Poland) Iga Świątek	(China) Wang Xinyu (China) Wang Xiyu	(United States) Coco Gauff (United States) Caty McNally
2019	(Japan) Natsumi Kawaguchi (Hungary) Adrienn Nagy	(United States) Chloe Beck (United States) Emma Navarro	(United States) Savannah Broadus (United States) Abigail Forbes	(Latvia) Kamilla Bartone (Russia) Oksana Selekhmeteva
2020	(Philippines) Alexandra Eala (Indonesia) Priska Madelyn Nugroho	(Italy) Eleonora Alvisi (Italy) Lisa Pigato	not held	not held
2021	not held	(Philippines) Alexandra Eala (Russia) Oksana Selekhmeteva	(Belarus) Kristina Dmitruk (Russia) Diana Shnaider	(United States) Ashlyn Krueger (United States) Robin Montgomery
2022	(United States) Clervie Ngounoue (Russia) Diana Shnaider	(Czech Republic) Sára Bejlek (Czech Republic) Lucie Havlíčková	(Netherlands) Rose Marie Nijkamp (Kenya) Angella Okutoyi	(Czech Republic) Lucie Havlíčková; Diana Shnaider
2023	(Slovakia) Renáta Jamrichová (Italy) Federica Urgesi	(United States) Tyra Caterina Grant (United States) Clervie Ngounoue	(Czech Republic) Alena Kovačková (Czech Republic) Laura Samsonová	(Romania) Mara Gae; Anastasiia Gureva
2024	(United States) Tyra Caterina Grant (United States) Iva Jovic	(Slovakia) Renáta Jamrichová (Czech Republic) Tereza Valentová	(United States) Tyra Caterina Grant (United States) Iva Jovic	(Morocco) Malak El Allami (Norway) Emily Sartz-Lunde
2025	(United States) Annika Penickova (United States) Kristina Penickova	(Germany) Eva Bennemann (Germany) Sonja Zhenikhova	(United States) Kristina Penickova (Czech Republic) Vendula Valdmannová	(Czech Republic) Alena Kovačková (Czech Republic) Jana Kovačková
2026	(Czech Republic) Alena Kovačková (Czech Republic) Jana Kovačková	(Czech Republic) Jana Kovačková (Czech Republic) Kateřina Zajíčková	(Czech Republic) Jana Kovačková (Czech Republic) Kateřina Zajíčková	(United States) Annika Penickova (United States) Kristina Penickova

== Statistics ==
=== Most Grand Slam doubles titles ===
Note: when a tie, the person to reach the mark first is listed first.

Titles	Players
5	(Russia) Pavlyuchenkova
4	(United States) McGrath, (United States) Morariu, (Czech Republic) Varmužová, (Belarus) Azarenka, (Czech Republic) J. Kovačková

=== Non-calendar year Grand Slam ===
Players who held all four Grand Slam titles simultaneously (not in a calendar year).

Player	Australian Open	French Open	Wimbledon	US Open
(Czech Republic) Jana Kovačková	2026	2026	2026	2025

=== Career Grand Slam ===
Players who won all four Grand Slam titles over the course of their careers.

- The event at which the Career Grand Slam was completed indicated in bold

Player	Australian Open	French Open	Wimbledon	US Open
(Czech Republic) Jana Kovačková	2026	2026	**2026**	2025

=== Three titles in a single season ===
Key
**W**	F	SF	QF	#R	RR	Q#	DNQ	A	NH

(W) winner; (F) finalist; (SF) semifinalist; (QF) quarterfinalist; (#R) rounds 4, 3, 2, 1; (RR) round-robin stage; (Q#) qualification round; (DNQ) did not qualify; (A) absent; (NH) not held; (SR) strike rate (events won / competed); (W–L) win–loss record.

Player(s)	Year	Australian Open	French Open	Wimbledon	US Open
(United States) Beth Herr	1982	A	**W**	**W**	**W**
(United States) Corina Morariu	1995	**W**	**W**	SF	**W**
(Czech Republic) Ludmilla Varmuzova	1995	**W**	**W**	SF	**W**
(Belarus) Victoria Azarenka	2005	**W**	**W**	**W**	QF
(Russia) Anastasia Pavlyuchenkova	2006	**W**	**W**	**W**	F
(Poland) Urszula Radwańska	2007	F	**W**	**W**	**W**
(Hungary) Tímea Babos	2010	F	**W**	**W**	**W**
(United States) Sloane Stephens	2010	A	**W**	**W**	**W**
(United States) Taylor Townsend	2012	**W**	SF	**W**	**W**
(Czech Republic) Barbora Krejčíková	2013	F	**W**	**W**	**W**
(Czech Republic) Kateřina Siniaková	2013	2R	**W**	**W**	**W**
(Czech Republic) Jana Kovačková	2026	**W**	**W**	**W**	2R

=== Surface Slam ===
Players who won Grand Slam titles on clay, grass and hard courts in a calendar year.

Player	Year	Clay court slam	Hard court slam	Grass court slam
(United States) Beth Herr	1982	French Open	US Open	Wimbledon
(Belarus) Victoria Azarenka	2005	French Open	Australian Open	Wimbledon
(Russia) Anastasia Pavlyuchenkova	2006	French Open	Australian Open	Wimbledon
(Poland) Urszula Radwańska	2007	French Open	US Open	Wimbledon
(Hungary) Tímea Babos	2010	French Open	US Open	Wimbledon
(United States) Sloane Stephens	2010	French Open	US Open	Wimbledon
(Czech Republic) Barbora Krejčíková	2013	French Open	US Open	Wimbledon
(Czech Republic) Kateřina Siniaková	2013	French Open	US Open	Wimbledon
(Czech Republic) Jana Kovačková	2026	French Open	Australian Open	Wimbledon

=== Career Surface Slam ===
Players who won Grand Slam titles on clay, grass and hard courts iover the course of their careers.

- The event at which the Career Surface Slam was completed indicated in **bold**

==== Individual ====
Player	Clay court slam	Hard court slam	Grass court slam
(United States) Beth Herr	1982 French Open	**1982 US Open**	1982 Wimbledon
(Czech Republic) Barbora Strýcová	2002 French Open	2001 Australian Open	**2002 Wimbledon**
(Belarus) Victoria Azarenka	**2005 French Open**	2005 Australian Open	2004 Wimbledon
(Russia) Anastasia Pavlyuchenkova	2006 French Open	2006 Australian Open	**2006 Wimbledon**
(Poland) Urszula Radwańska	2007 French Open	**2007 US Open**	2007 Wimbledon
(Thailand) Noppawan Lertcheewakarn	2009 French Open	2008 US Open	**2009 Wimbledon**
(Hungary) Tímea Babos	2010 French Open	**2010 US Open**	2010 Wimbledon
(United States) Sloane Stephens	2010 French Open	**2010 US Open**	2010 Wimbledon
(Czech Republic) Barbora Krejčíková	2013 French Open	**2013 US Open**	2013 Wimbledon
(Czech Republic) Kateřina Siniaková	2013 French Open	**2013 US Open**	2013 Wimbledon
(Serbia) Olga Danilović	2016 French Open	**2017 US Open**	2017 Wimbledon
(United States) Tyra Caterina Grant	2023 French Open	2024 Australian Open	**2024 Wimbledon**
(Czech Republic) Jana Kovačková	2026 French Open	2025 US Open	**2026 Wimbledon**

==== Team ====
Player	Clay court slam	Hard court slam	Grass court slam
(Hungary) Tímea Babos (United States) Sloane Stephens	2010 French Open	**2010 US Open**	2010 Wimbledon
(Czech Republic) Barbora Krejčíková (Czech Republic) Kateřina Siniaková	2013 French Open	**2013 US Open**	2013 Wimbledon

=== Channel Slam ===
Players who won the French Open-Wimbledon double.

Year	Player
1982	(United States) Beth Herr
1987	(Soviet Union) Natalia Medvedeva
1987	(Soviet Union) Natasha Zvereva
1992	(Belgium) Laurence Courtois
1992	(Belgium) Nancy Feber
1997	(Zimbabwe) Cara Black
1997	(Kazakhstan) Irina Selyutina
2002	(Czech Republic) Barbora Strýcová
2005	(Hungary) Ágnes Szávay
2005	(Belarus) Victoria Azarenka
2006	(Russia) Anastasia Pavlyuchenkova
2007	(Poland) Urszula Radwańska
2008	(Australia) Jessica Moore
2008	(Slovenia) Polona Hercog
2009	(Thailand) Noppawan Lertcheewakarn
2010	(United States) Sloane Stephens
2010	(Hungary) Tímea Babos
2013	(Czech Republic) Barbora Krejčíková
2013	(Czech Republic) Kateřina Siniaková
2026	(Czech Republic) Jana Kovačková
2026	(Czech Republic) Kateřina Zajíčková

== Sources ==
- ITF Australian Open
- ITF Roland Garros
- ITF Wimbledon
- ITF US Open

== See also ==
- List of Grand Slam girls' singles champions
- List of Grand Slam boys' singles champions
- List of Grand Slam boys' doubles champions
