= List of Grand Slam boys' singles champions =

List of Boys' Singles Junior Grand Slam tournaments tennis champions.

== Champions by year ==
Legend
bold outline	Player won the Jrs Grand Slam (four major tournaments in the same year).

Year	Australian Open	French Open	Wimbledon	US Open
1922	(Australia) Alan Yeldham	started in 1947		started in 1973
1923	(Australia) Leonard Cryle	started in 1947		started in 1973
1924	(Australia) Alan Coldham	started in 1947		started in 1973
1925	(Australia) Alan Coldham	started in 1947		started in 1973
1926	(Australia) Jack Crawford	started in 1947		started in 1973
1927	(Australia) Jack Crawford	started in 1947		started in 1973
1928	(Australia) Jack Crawford	started in 1947		started in 1973
1929	(Australia) Jack Crawford	started in 1947		started in 1973
1930	(Australia) Don Turnbull	started in 1947		started in 1973
1931	(Australia) Bruce Moore	started in 1947		started in 1973
1932	(Australia) Vivian McGrath	started in 1947		started in 1973
1933	(Australia) Adrian Quist	started in 1947		started in 1973
1934	(Australia) Neil Ennis	started in 1947		started in 1973
1935	(Australia) John Bromwich	started in 1947		started in 1973
1936	(Australia) John Bromwich	started in 1947		started in 1973
1937	(Australia) John Bromwich	started in 1947		started in 1973
1938	(Australia) Max Newcombe	started in 1947		started in 1973
1939	(Australia) Bill Sidwell	started in 1947		started in 1973
1940	(Australia) Dinny Pails	started in 1947		started in 1973
1941- 1945	no competition, World War II	started in 1947		started in 1973
1946	(Australia) Frank Sedgman	started in 1947		started in 1973
1947	(Australia) Don Candy	(Belgium) Jacky Brichant	(Denmark) Kurt Nielsen	started in 1973
1948	(Australia) Ken McGregor	(Denmark) Kurt Nielsen	(Sweden) Staffan Stockenberg	started in 1973
1949	(Australia) Clive Wilderspin	(France) Jean-Claude Molinari	(Sweden) Staffan Stockenberg	started in 1973
1950	(Australia) Ken Rosewall	(France) Roland Dubuisson	(United Kingdom) John Horn	started in 1973
1951	(Australia) Lew Hoad	(United States) Ham Richardson	(South Africa) Johann Kupferburger	started in 1973
1952	(Australia) Ken Rosewall	(Australia) Ken Rosewall	(United Kingdom) Bobby Wilson	started in 1973
1953	(Australia) Bill Gilmour Sr.	(France) Jean-Noël Grinda	(United Kingdom) Billy Knight	started in 1973
1954	(United Kingdom) Billy Knight	(Australia) Roy Emerson	(India) Ramanathan Krishnan	started in 1973
1955	(United States) Gerry Moss	(Spain) Andrés Gimeno	(United Kingdom) Mike Hann	started in 1973
1956	(Australia) Bob Mark	(Tunisia) Mustapha Belkhodja	(United States) Ronald Holmberg	started in 1973
1957	(Australia) Rod Laver	(Spain) Alberto Arilla	(United Kingdom) Jimmy Tattersall	started in 1973
1958	(Australia) Martin Mulligan	(United States) Butch Buchholz	(United States) Butch Buchholz	started in 1973
1959	(United States) Butch Buchholz	(West Germany) Ingo Buding	(Soviet Union) Toomas Leius	started in 1973
1960	(Australia) Will Coghlan	(West Germany) Ingo Buding	(South Africa) Rodney Mandelstam	started in 1973
1961	(Australia) John Newcombe	(Australia) John Newcombe	(United States) Clark Graebner	started in 1973
1962	(Australia) John Newcombe	(Australia) John Newcombe	(United Kingdom) Stanley Matthews	started in 1973
1963	(Australia) John Newcombe	(Greece) Nicky Kalogeropoulos	(Greece) Nicholas Kalogeropoulos	started in 1973
1964	(Australia) Tony Roche	(United States) Cliff Richey	(United Arab Republic) Ismail El Shafei	started in 1973
1965	(France) Georges Goven	(United Kingdom) Gerald Battrick	(Soviet Union) Vladimir Korotkov	started in 1973
1966	(Australia) Karl Coombes	(Soviet Union) Vladimir Korotkov	(Soviet Union) Vladimir Korotkov	started in 1973
1967	(New Zealand) Brian Fairlie	(France) Patrick Proisy	(Spain) Manuel Orantes	started in 1973
1968	(Australia) Phil Dent	(Australia) Phil Dent	(Australia) John Alexander	started in 1973
1969	(Australia) Allan McDonald	(Spain) Antonio Muñoz	(South Africa) Byron Bertram	started in 1973
1970	(Australia) John Alexander	(Spain) Juan Herrera	(South Africa) Byron Bertram	started in 1973
1971	(Australia) Cliff Letcher	(Italy) Corrado Barazzutti	(United States) Robert Kreiss	started in 1973
1972	(Australia) Paul Kronk	(United Kingdom) Buster Mottram	(Sweden) Björn Borg	started in 1973
1973	(Australia) Paul McNamee	(Paraguay) Víctor Pecci	(United States) Billy Martin	(United States) Billy Martin
1974	(Australia) Harry Brittain	(France) Christophe Casa	(United States) Billy Martin	(United States) Billy Martin
1975	(Australia) Brad Drewett	(France) Christophe Roger-Vasselin	(New Zealand) Chris Lewis	(United States) Howard Schoenfield
1976	(Australia) Ray Kelly	(Switzerland) Heinz Günthardt	(Switzerland) Heinz Günthardt	(Ecuador) Ricardo Ycaza
1977	(Australia) Brad Drewett (Jan) (Australia) Ray Kelly (Dec)	(United States) John McEnroe	(United States) Van Winitsky	(United States) Van Winitsky
1978	(Australia) Pat Serret	(Czechoslovakia) Ivan Lendl	(Czechoslovakia) Ivan Lendl	(Sweden) Per Hjertquist
1979	(Australia) Greg Whitecross	(India) Ramesh Krishnan	(India) Ramesh Krishnan	(United States) Scott Davis
1980	(Australia) Craig Miller	(France) Henri Leconte	(France) Thierry Tulasne	(United States) Mike Falberg
1981	(Sweden) Jörgen Windahl	(Sweden) Mats Wilander	(United States) Matt Anger	(Sweden) Thomas Högstedt
1982	(Australia) Mark Kratzmann	(France) Tarik Benhabiles	(Australia) Pat Cash	(Australia) Pat Cash
1983	(Sweden) Stefan Edberg	(Sweden) Stefan Edberg	(Sweden) Stefan Edberg	(Sweden) Stefan Edberg
1984	(Australia) Mark Kratzmann	(Sweden) Kent Carlsson	(Australia) Mark Kratzmann	(Australia) Mark Kratzmann
1985	(Australia) Shane Barr	(Peru) Jaime Yzaga	(Mexico) Leonardo Lavalle	(United States) Tim Trigueiro
1986	no competition	(Argentina) Guillermo Pérez Roldán	(Mexico) Eduardo Vélez	(Spain) Javier Sánchez
1987	(Australia) Jason Stoltenberg	(Argentina) Guillermo Pérez Roldán	(Italy) Diego Nargiso	(United States) David Wheaton
1988	(Australia) Johan Anderson	(Venezuela) Nicolás Pereira	(Venezuela) Nicolás Pereira	(Venezuela) Nicolás Pereira
1989	(Sweden) Nicklas Kulti	(France) Fabrice Santoro	(Sweden) Nicklas Kulti	(United States) Jonathan Stark
1990	(West Germany) Dirk Dier	(Italy) Andrea Gaudenzi	(India) Leander Paes	(Italy) Andrea Gaudenzi
1991	(Sweden) Thomas Enqvist	(Soviet Union) Andriy Medvedev	(Sweden) Thomas Enqvist	(India) Leander Paes
1992	(Australia) Grant Doyle	(Romania) Andrei Pavel	(Czech Republic) David Škoch	(United States) Brian Dunn
1993	(United Kingdom) James Baily	(Spain) Roberto Carretero	(Romania) Răzvan Sabău	(Chile) Marcelo Ríos
1994	(Australia) Ben Ellwood	(Spain) Jacobo Díaz	(United States) Scott Humphries	(Netherlands) Sjeng Schalken
1995	(Germany) Nicolas Kiefer	(Argentina) Mariano Zabaleta	(France) Olivier Mutis	(Germany) Nicolas Kiefer
1996	(Sweden) Björn Rehnquist	(Spain) Alberto Martín	(Belarus) Vladimir Voltchkov	(Germany) Daniel Elsner
1997	(Germany) Daniel Elsner	(Germany) Daniel Elsner	(South Africa) Wesley Whitehouse	(France) Arnaud Di Pasquale
1998	(France) Julien Jeanpierre	(Chile) Fernando González	(Switzerland) Roger Federer	(Argentina) David Nalbandian
1999	(Denmark) Kristian Pless	(Argentina) Guillermo Coria	(Austria) Jürgen Melzer	(Finland) Jarkko Nieminen
2000	(United States) Andy Roddick	(France) Paul-Henri Mathieu	(France) Nicolas Mahut	(United States) Andy Roddick
2001	(Serbia and Montenegro) Janko Tipsarević	(Spain) Carlos Cuadrado	(Switzerland) Roman Valent	(Luxembourg) Gilles Müller
2002	(France) Clément Morel	(France) Richard Gasquet	(Australia) Todd Reid	(France) Richard Gasquet
2003	(Cyprus) Marcos Baghdatis	(Switzerland) Stanislas Wawrinka	(Romania) Florin Mergea	(France) Jo-Wilfried Tsonga
2004	(France) Gaël Monfils	(France) Gaël Monfils	(France) Gaël Monfils	(United Kingdom) Andy Murray
2005	(United States) Donald Young	(Croatia) Marin Čilić	(France) Jérémy Chardy	(The Bahamas) Ryan Sweeting
2006	(France) Alexandre Sidorenko	(Slovakia) Martin Kližan	(Netherlands) Thiemo de Bakker	(Czech Republic) Dušan Lojda
2007	(Australia) Brydan Klein	(Belarus) Uladzimir Ignatik	(United States) Donald Young	(Lithuania) Ričardas Berankis
2008	(Australia) Bernard Tomic	(Chinese Taipei) Yang Tsung-hua	(Bulgaria) Grigor Dimitrov	(Bulgaria) Grigor Dimitrov
2009	(India) Yuki Bhambri	(Sweden) Daniel Berta	(Russia) Andrey Kuznetsov	(Australia) Bernard Tomic
2010	(Brazil) Tiago Fernandes	(Argentina) Agustín Velotti	(Hungary) Márton Fucsovics	(United States) Jack Sock
2011	(Czech Republic) Jiří Veselý	(United States) Bjorn Fratangelo	(Australia) Luke Saville	(United Kingdom) Oliver Golding
2012	(Australia) Luke Saville	(Belgium) Kimmer Coppejans	(Canada) Filip Peliwo	(Canada) Filip Peliwo
2013	(Australia) Nick Kyrgios	(Chile) Cristian Garín	(Italy) Gianluigi Quinzi	(Croatia) Borna Ćorić
2014	(Germany) Alexander Zverev	(Russia) Andrey Rublev	(United States) Noah Rubin	(Australia) Omar Jasika
2015	(Russia) Roman Safiullin	(United States) Tommy Paul	(United States) Reilly Opelka	(United States) Taylor Fritz
2016	(Australia) Oliver Anderson	(France) Geoffrey Blancaneaux	(Canada) Denis Shapovalov	(Canada) Félix Auger-Aliassime
2017	(Hungary) Zsombor Piros	(Australia) Alexei Popyrin	(Spain) Alejandro Davidovich Fokina	(China) Wu Yibing
2018	(United States) Sebastian Korda	(Chinese Taipei) Tseng Chun-hsin	(Chinese Taipei) Tseng Chun-hsin	(Brazil) Thiago Seyboth Wild
2019	(Italy) Lorenzo Musetti	(Denmark) Holger Rune	(Japan) Shintaro Mochizuki	(Czech Republic) Jonáš Forejtek
2020	(France) Harold Mayot	(Switzerland) Dominic Stricker	COVID-19 pandemic	not played
2021	not played	(France) Luca Van Assche	(United States) Samir Banerjee	(Spain) Daniel Rincón
2022	(United States) Bruno Kuzuhara	(France) Gabriel Debru	(Croatia) Mili Poljičak	(Spain) Martín Landaluce
2023	(Belgium) Alexander Blockx	(Croatia) Dino Prižmić	(United Kingdom) Henry Searle	(Brazil) João Fonseca
2024	(Japan) Rei Sakamoto	(United States) Kaylan Bigun	(Norway) Nicolai Budkov Kjær	(Spain) Rafael Jódar
2025	(Switzerland) Henry Bernet	(Germany) Niels McDonald	(Bulgaria) Ivan Ivanov	(Bulgaria) Ivan Ivanov
2026	(Slovenia) Žiga Šeško	(Brazil) Luís Guto Miguel	(United States) Jordan Lee	(United States) Marcel Latak
Year	Australian Open	French Open	Wimbledon	US Open

== Statistics ==
=== Most Grand Slam singles titles ===
Note: when a tie, the person to reach the mark first is listed first.

Titles	Players
5	(Australia) Newcombe
4	(Australia) Crawford, (United States) Martin, (Sweden) Edberg, (Australia) Kratzmann
3	(Australia) Bromwich, (Australia) Rosewall, (United States) Buchholz, (Soviet Union) Korotkov, (Venezuela) Pereira, (Germany) Elsner, (France) Monfils

=== Grand Slam singles titles by country (since 1973) ===
32	United States

30	Australia

24	France

15	Sweden

9	Spain

7	Germany, Switzerland

6	Argentina, Czech Republic

5	India, Italy

4	Brazil, Bulgaria, Canada, Croatia, Great Britain

3	Chile, Chinese Taipei, Romania, Russia, Venezuela

2	Belarus, Belgium, Denmark, Hungary, Japan, Mexico, Netherlands

1	Austria, Bahamas, China, Cyprus, Ecuador, Finland, Lithuania, Luxembourg, New Zealand, Norway, Paraguay, Peru, Serbia and Montenegro, Slovakia, Slovenia, South Africa, Soviet Union

== Grand Slam achievements ==
=== Grand Slam ===
Players who held all four Grand Slam titles simultaneously (in a calendar year).

Player	Australian Open	French Open	Wimbledon	US Open
(Sweden) Stefan Edberg	1983	1983	1983	1983

=== Career Grand Slam ===
Players who won all four Grand Slam titles over the course of their careers.

- The event at which the Career Grand Slam was achieved is indicated in **bold**.

Player	Australian Open	French Open	Wimbledon	US Open
(Sweden) Stefan Edberg	1983	1983	1983	**1983**

== Multiple titles in a season ==
=== Three titles in a single season ===
Note: players who won 4 titles in a season are not included here.

Player	Year	Australian Open	French Open	Wimbledon	US Open
(Australia) Mark Kratzmann	1984	**W**	F	**W**	**W**
(Venezuela) Nicolás Pereira	1988	A	**W**	**W**	**W**
(France) Gaël Monfils	2004	**W**	**W**	**W**	3R

=== Two titles in a single season ===
Note: players who won 3+ titles in a season are not included here.

- Australian—French:
  - 1952 (Australia) Ken Rosewall
  - 1961 (Australia) John Newcombe
  - 1962 (Australia) John Newcombe (2)
  - 1968 (Australia) Phil Dent
  - 1997 (Germany) Daniel Elsner
- Australian—Wimbledon:
  - 1989 (Sweden) Nicklas Kulti
  - 1991 (Sweden) Thomas Enqvist
- Australian—U.S.:
  - 1995 (Germany) Nicolas Kiefer
  - 2000 (United States) Andy Roddick
- French—Wimbledon:
  - 1958 (United States) Butch Buchholz
  - 1963 (Greece) Nicky Kalogeropoulos
  - 1966 (Soviet Union) Vladimir Korotkov
  - 1976 (Switzerland) Heinz Günthardt
  - 1978 (Czech Republic) Ivan Lendl
  - 1979 (India) Ramesh Krishnan
  - 2018 (Chinese Taipei) Tseng Chun-hsin
- French—U.S.:
  - 1990 (Italy) Andrea Gaudenzi
  - 2002 (France) Richard Gasquet
- Wimbledon—U.S.:
  - 1973 (United States) Billy Martin
  - 1974 (United States) Billy Martin (2)
  - 1977 (United States) Van Winitsky
  - 1982 (Australia) Pat Cash
  - 2008 (Bulgaria) Grigor Dimitrov
  - 2012 (Canada) Filip Peliwo
  - 2025 (Bulgaria) Ivan Ivanov

=== Surface Slam ===
Players who won Grand Slam titles on clay, grass and hard courts in a calendar year.

Player	Year	Clay court slam	Hard court slam	Grass court slam
(Sweden) Stefan Edberg	1983	French Open	US Open	Wimbledon
(Sweden) Stefan Edberg	1983	French Open	US Open	Australian Open
(Venezuela) Nicolás Pereira	1988	French Open	US Open	Wimbledon
(France) Gaël Monfils	2004	French Open	Australian Open	Wimbledon

=== Career Surface Slam ===
Players who won Grand Slam titles on clay, grass and hard courts iover the course of their careers.

- The event at which the Career Surface Slam was completed indicated in **bold**

Player	Clay court slam	Hard court slam	Grass court slam
(Sweden) Stefan Edberg	1983 French Open	**1983 US Open**	1983 Wimbledon
(Venezuela) Nicolás Pereira	1988 French Open	**1988 US Open**	1988 Wimbledon
(France) Gaël Monfils	2004 French Open	2004 Australian Open	**2004 Wimbledon**

=== Channel Slam ===
Players who won the French Open-Wimbledon double.

Year	Player
1958	(United States) Butch Buchholz
1963	(Greece) Nicholas Kalogeropoulos
1966	(Soviet Union) Vladimir Korotkov
1976	(Switzerland) Heinz Günthardt
1978	(Czech Republic) Ivan Lendl
1979	(India) Ramesh Krishnan
1983	(Sweden) Stefan Edberg
1988	(Venezuela) Nicolás Pereira
2004	(France) Gaël Monfils
2018	(Chinese Taipei) Tseng Chun-hsin

== See also ==
- List of Grand Slam girls' singles champions
- List of Grand Slam boys' doubles champions
- List of Grand Slam girls' doubles champions
