= Outline of tennis =

Overview of and topical guide to tennis

The following outline is provided as an overview of and topical guide to tennis.

Tennis – sport usually played between two players (singles) or between two teams of two players each (doubles). Each player uses a specialized racquet that is strung to strike a hollow rubber ball covered with felt over a net into the opponent's court.

== Definition of tennis ==
- Exercise – bodily activity that enhances or maintains physical fitness and overall health or wellness.
  - Aerobic exercise – physical exercise that intends to improve the oxygen system. Aerobic means "with oxygen", and refers to the use of oxygen in the body's energy-generating process (the citric acid cycle).
- Game – structured activity, usually undertaken for enjoyment and sometimes used as an educational tool. Games are distinct from work, which is usually carried out for remuneration, and from art, which is more concerned with the expression of ideas. However, the distinction is not clear-cut, and many games are also considered to be work (such as professional sports).
  - Ball game – a game played with a ball. There are many kinds of ball games, racquet-and-ball games being just one category of them.
- Sport – form of physical activity which, through casual or organised participation, aim to use, maintain or improve physical fitness and provide entertainment to participants.
  - Racquet sport – a sport in which players use racquets (or rackets) to hit a ball or other object.
  - One-on-one sport –
  - Competitive sport – sport in which one or more participants or teams compete against one another. The one that is the most successful in achieving the objective of the game or sport event is the winner.
  - Team sport – sport that involves players working together towards a shared objective.
  - Recreational sport – sport engaged in as a leisure time activity.
  - Spectator sport – sport that is characterized by the presence of spectators, or watchers, at its matches. Spectator sports are a form of entertainment.
  - Professional sport – sport in which the athletes receive payment for their performance.

== Types of tennis ==
=== Types of tennis matches ===
Types of tennis match

- Standard matches – are played in official tournaments and during casual play.
  - Singles – two players compete, usually two men or two women, although games between a man and a woman may be played on an informal basis. Singles matches do not include the part of the tennis court called the alley.
  - Doubles – two teams of two players each, most often all-male or all-female. The two players on the receiving side change positions after each point played: one at the net and the other near the baseline preparing to return serve. The full court is used in doubles matches, that is, the area in the alley is included.
  - Mixed doubles – same as doubles, but with one man and one woman on each team.
- Other informal matches
  - Canadian doubles – two players play against one player, where the duo can only hit the ball within the single player's singles lines. Often used for training, or when the single player is much better than the other two.
- Tennis games

== Equipment used in the game ==
Tennis technology

- Tennis ball – hollow rubber ball approximately 6.7 cm (2.7 in.) in diameter, covered in bright green-yellow fibrous fluffy felt. For recreational play tennis balls can be any color.
- Tennis racquet –
- Tennis court –
  - There are four types of tennis court:
    1. Clay court –
    2. Grass court –
    3. Hard court –
    4. Carpet court –
  - The parts of a tennis court include:
    - Ad court – short for "advantage court", it is the left side of the receiving team, or the right side of the opponent's court as viewed from the server's side, significant as the receiving side for an ad point.
    - Alley (Tramlines) – zone between the singles court and the doubles court. There are two alleys, one on the Ad side and one on the Deuce side. These are only used when playing doubles.
    - Back court – area between the baseline and the service line, also called no man's land. It is not recommended to stand in this area because this is where balls usually bounce.
    - Baseline – line marking the end of the court, at the back of the back court and the alleys.
    - Center line – line dividing the two service boxes in the center of the court.
    - Center mark – 12-inch mark at the halfway point of the baseline used to distinguish the right and left halves of a tennis court.
    - Deuce court – right side of the receiving team, the left side of the opponent's court as viewed from the server's side, significant as the receiving side for a deuce point.
    - Middle T – See T.
    - Net –
    - Service box – area bordered by the net, the singles sideline, the service line, and the center line. There are a left and a right service box on each side of the court, separated by the center line.
    - Service line – line located between the net and the baseline, parallel to the net, marking the end of the service boxes.
    - Side T – T-shape formed by the service line and the sideline. There are two such side Ts.
    - T or Middle T – T-shape formed by the service line and the center line.
- Accessories often used in tennis:
  - Athletic shoe –
  - Wristband –

== Rules of tennis ==
- Match – To win a match in tennis, a player or a doubles team must win the majority of prescribed sets. A match consists of the best of three sets or, only on the men's side, the best of five in grand slams and Davis Cup play. Doubles matches are usually the best of three sets, with the third set being played in a matching tie break form.
  - Sets – a maximum of 12 games, unless a player or team reaches 6 or 7 games and are clear by two. If the set gets to 6-all then a tie-breaker is played
    - Games – which are the first to four points and clear by two, and a maximum of 12 games make up a set.
      - Tie break – In regular play, if the scores reach 6 all then a tie break is played. It is played to the first to seven points (10 in final set) and must be won by at least two points. If not then play continues until one player is two points ahead.
        - double tennis rules – Double rule in tennis played when you and your game mate play a tennis game with another team of two players and use the complete court in between the baseline and double sidelines.
          - Points – Points are passages of play in which players win points to make a game. The scoring is based on a clock face. The scoring is fifteen, thirty, forty-five (although this was shortened to forty to make it easier for the umpire) and game. However, if the players are tied at 40-all, otherwise known as the deuce, then a player must win two points consecutively from deuce to win the game.

== Game play ==
=== Tennis moves ===
==== Tennis shots ====
Tennis shots There are eight basic shots in the game of tennis:

1. Serve – a shot to start a point. A player begins a serve by tossing the ball into the air and hitting it (usually near the highest point of the toss) into the diagonally opposite service box without being stopped by the net.
  - Ace – a legal serve that is not touched by the receiver. Aces are usually powerful and generally land on or near one of the corners at the back of the service box.
2. Forehand – shot made by swinging the racquet across one's body in the direction of where the player wants to place the shot. It is considered the easiest shot to master, perhaps because it is the most natural stroke.
3. Backhand – shot in which one swings the racquet around one's body in the direction where one wants the ball to go, usually performed from the baseline or as an approach shot. The backhand can be a one-handed or two-handed stroke.
4. Volley –
5. Half volley – (pick-up ball)
6. Overhead smash –
7. Drop shot –
8. Lob –

=== Strategy and styles of play ===
Tennis strategy Players are often described by their style of play:

- Offensive baseliner –
- Defensive baseliner –
- Serve-and-volleyer –
- All-court player –

Doubles strategies include:

- Both-up strategy –
- Up-and-back strategy –
- Both-back strategy –

== History of tennis ==
History of tennis

== Governing bodies ==
=== International ===
- Association of Tennis Professionals (ATP) – principal organizing body to protect men's professional tennis.
- Women's Tennis Association (WTA) – principal organizing body to protect women's professional tennis.
- International Tennis Federation (ITF) – principal organizing body to protect professional tennis.

=== National ===
- Tennis Australia – principal organizing body to protect Australian tennis.
- (Brazil) Confederação Brasileira de Tênis (CBT) –
- Tennis Canada –
- (China) Chinese Tennis Association (CTA) –
- (Croatia) Croatian Tennis Association, (CTA) –
- Cyprus Tennis Federation –
- (France) Fédération Française de Tennis (FFT) – principal organizing body to protect French tennis.
- (Germany) Deutscher Tennis Bund (DTB) –
- All India Tennis Association (AITA) –
- (Republic of Ireland) Tennis Ireland – principal organizing body to protect Ireland tennis.
- Israel Tennis Association (ITA) –
- (Lithuania) Lithuanian Tennis Association (LTS) –
- Luxembourg Tennis Federation (FLT) –
- Tennis Federation of Montenegro (TSCG) –
- (United Kingdom) Lawn Tennis Association (LTA) – principal organizing body to protect British tennis.
- United States Tennis Association (USTA) – principal organizing body to protect American tennis.

=== Regional ===
- (European Union) Tennis Europe – organizing body to protect European professional tennis.

== Tournaments ==
=== Grand Slam ===
The Grand Slams, the four major tournaments in tennis, are the most important tennis events of the year in terms of world ranking points, tradition, prize-money awarded, and public attention. They are:

1. Australian Open – founded 1905
2. French Open – founded 1891, open to all amateurs internationally in 1925
3. Wimbledon Championships – the oldest and most prestigious tennis tournament in the world, held at the All England Club since 1877.
4. US Open – founded 1881

=== Professional tennis ===
- ATP World Tour
  - ATP Finals
  - ATP World Tour Masters 1000
  - ATP World Tour 500 series
  - ATP World Tour 250 series
  - ATP Challenger Tour
- WTA Tour
  - WTA Finals
  - WTA Premier tournaments
  - WTA International tournaments

=== Team tennis ===
- Davis Cup
- Fed Cup
- Hopman Cup
- Laver Cup
- World TeamTennis

=== Multi-sport games ===
- Tennis at the Summer Olympics
- Wheelchair tennis at the Summer Paralympics
- Tennis at the Commonwealth Games
- Tennis at the African Games
- Tennis at the Asian Games
- Tennis at the Pan American Games
- Tennis at the Pacific Games
- Tennis at the Southeast Asian Games
- Tennis at the Summer Universiade
- Tennis at the Youth Olympic Games

== Persons influential in the sport ==
=== Famous tennis players ===
- List of male tennis players
- List of female tennis players

By championship

- List of Australian Open champions
- List of French Open champions
- List of Wimbledon champions
- List of US Open champions

== See also ==
- Outline of sports
- Table tennis
- Tennis
