= Glossary of tennis terms =

This page is a glossary of tennis terminology.

== A ==
- Ace: Serve where the tennis ball lands inside the service box and is not touched by the receiver; thus, a shot that is both a serve and a winner is an ace. Aces are usually powerful and generally land on or near one of the corners at the back of the service box. Initially, the term was used to indicate the scoring of a point.
- Action: Synonym of spin.
- Ad court: Left side of the court of each player, so called because the ad (advantage) point immediately following a deuce is always served to this side of the court.
- Ad in: Advantage to the server.
- Ad out: Advantage to the receiver.
- Ad: Used by the chair umpire to announce the score when a player has the advantage, meaning they won the point immediately after a deuce. See scoring in tennis.
- Advantage set: Set won by a player or team having won at least six games with a two-game advantage over the opponent (as opposed to a tiebreak format). All advantage sets were used at the final set of matches at the Olympic tennis events (until 2012), Davis Cup (until 2015), Fed Cup (until 2015), Australian Open (until 2018), Wimbledon (until 2018) and French Open (until 2021) when they were all switched to tie breaks.
- Advantage: When one player wins the first point from a deuce and needs one more point to win the game; not applicable when using deciding points.
- All-Comers: Tournament in which all players took part except the reigning champion. The winner of the All-Comers event would play the title holder in the Challenge Round.
- All-court (or all-court game): Style of play that is a composite of all the different playing styles, which includes baseline, transition, and serve and volley styles.
- All-courter: Player with an all-court game.
- All: Used by the chair umpire to announce scores when both players have the same number of points or the same number of games. When both players are at 40, the preferred term is deuce.
- Alley: Area of the court between the singles and the doubles sidelines, which together are known as tramlines.
- Alternate: Player or team that gains acceptance into the main draw of a tournament when a main draw player or team withdraws. Such a player may be a lucky loser.
- American doubles (or American singles, Australian doubles and cut-throat tennis): Informal and unsanctioned variation of tennis played with three players—two on one side of the court and one on the other. The team of two players can only hit the ball within the single player's singles lines, whilst the single player can hit into the full doubles court on the doubles team's side. After each game, the players rotate such that each player plays in every position on the court during the match. See also: Canadian doubles.
- Approach shot (or approach): A groundstroke shot used as a setup as the player approaches the net, often using underspin or topspin.
- ATP Finals: (formerly Masters Grand Prix, ATP Tour World Championship, Tennis Masters Cup and ATP World Tour Finals): Annual season-ending tournament of the ATP Tour featuring the eight top-ranked men in the world (plus two alternates).
- ATP Race (or ATP Race to Milan/Turin/London; formerly ATP Champions Race): ATP point ranking system that starts at the beginning of the year and by the end of the year mirrors the ATP entry system ranking. The top eight players at the end of the year qualify for the ATP Finals.
- ATP Tour (formerly ATP World Tour): Worldwide top-tier tennis tour for men organized by the Association of Tennis Professionals.
- ATP: Abbreviation for Association of Tennis Professionals, the main organizing body of men's professional tennis; governs the ATP Tour with the largest tournaments for men.
- Australian doubles: See American doubles.
- Australian formation: In doubles, a formation where the server and partner stand on the same side of the court before starting the point.

== B ==
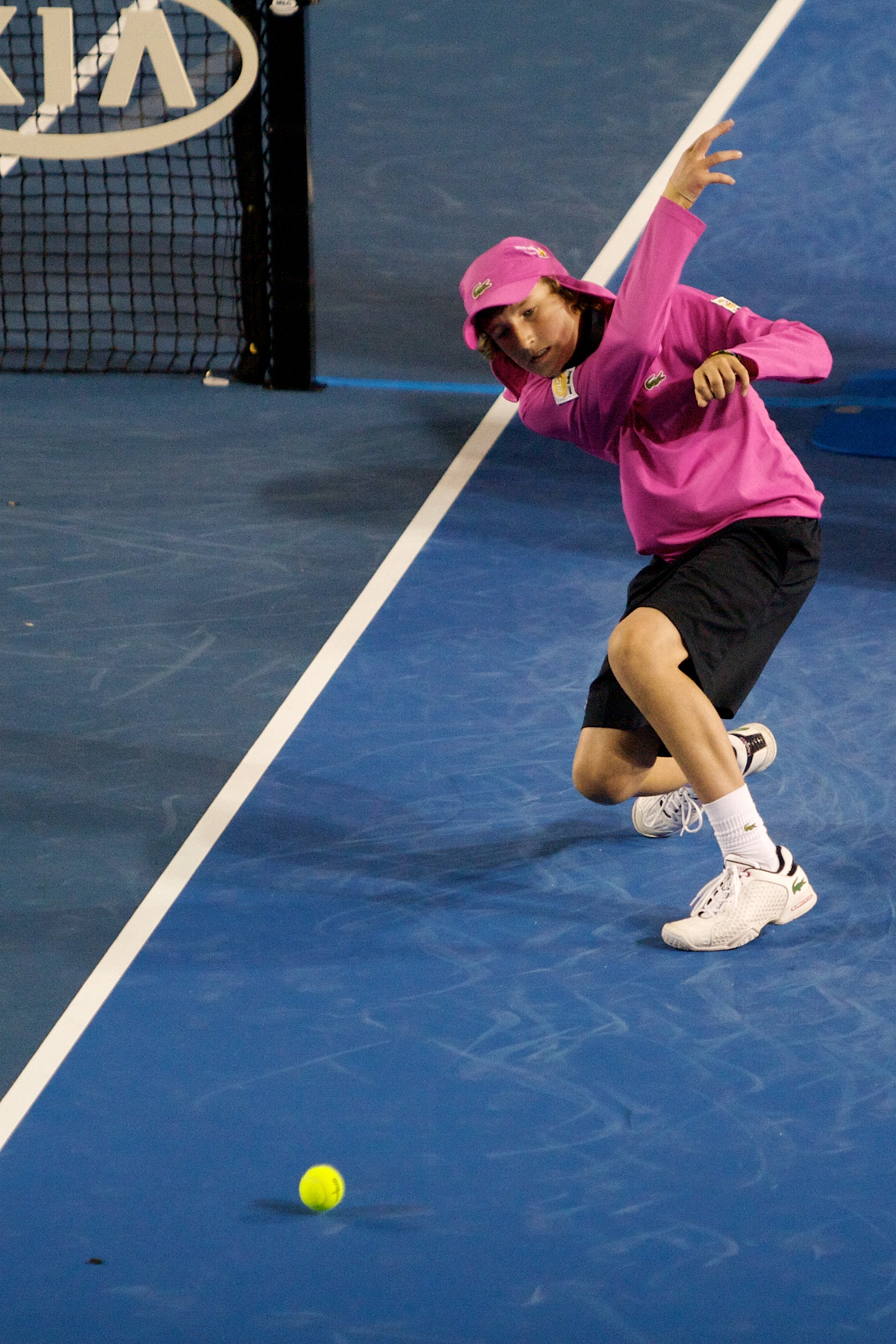
A ball boy in action

- Backboard: Vertical wall, often with the image of a tennis net painted on it, which is used to practice hitting against such that the ball bounces back without the need for a partner.
- Backcourt: The area of the tennis court between the baseline and the service line.
- Backhand: Stroke in which the ball is hit with the back of the racket hand facing the ball at the moment of contact. A backhand is often hit by a right-handed player when the ball is on the left side of the court, and vice versa.
- Backhand smash: A type of smash played over the backhand side.
- Backspin: Shot that rotates the ball backwards after it is hit; also known as slice or underspin. The trajectory of the shot is affected by an upward force that lifts the ball. See Magnus effect.
- Backswing: Portion of a swing where the racket is swung backwards in preparation for the forward motion to hit the ball.
- Bagel: Colloquial term for winning or losing a set 6–0 (the shape of the zero being reminiscent of the round shape of a bagel). See also breadstick.
- Bagnall-Wild: A method of draw which places all byes in the first round. Introduced in the 1880s by Ralph Bagnall Bagnall-Wild.
- Ball boy (also ball girl or ballkid): a person, commonly a child, tasked with retrieving tennis balls from the court that have gone out of play and supplying the balls to the players before their service. Ball boys in net positions normally kneel near the net and run across the court to collect the ball, while ball boys in the back positions stand in the back along the perimeter of the arena. Ball boys in the back are responsible for giving the balls to the player serving.
- Ball toss: The action of throwing up the ball prior to the serve.
- Ball machine: Machine that shoots tennis balls onto the court at a similar speed and trajectory as a human player, allowing an individual to practice their strokes without the need for a partner.
- Banana shot or banana forehand: Forehand hit down the line with sufficient spin that it curves in the air outside over the tramline and then back into the court again. A signature shot of Rafael Nadal.
- Baseline: Line at the furthest ends of the court indicating the boundary of the area of play. If the ball goes over the baseline it will be the other player's point.
- Baseliner: Player who plays around the baseline during play and relies on the quality of their ground strokes.
- Big serve: Forceful serve, usually giving an advantage in the point for the server.
- Billie Jean King Cup (formerly Fed Cup or Federation Cup): International, annual women's tennis competition where teams from participating countries compete in a single-elimination format tournament with matches occurring at several stages during the year.
- Bisque: One stroke (point), which may be claimed by the receiver at any part of the set. Part of the handicapping odds and used during the early era of the sport. Abolished by the LTA in 1890.
- Block (or blocked shot, blocked return): Defensive shot with relatively little backswing and shortened action instead of a full swing, usually while returning a serve.
- Bounce: The upward movement of the ball after it has hit the ground. The trajectory of the bounce can be affected by the surface and weather, the amount and type of spin and the power of the shot.
- Boxed set: The career slam in singles, doubles, and mixed, i.e. winning at least one title in each discipline at all four of the slam venues. Has been completed only four times, by Doris Hart, Margaret Court (twice), and Martina Navratilova.
- Breadstick: Colloquial term for winning or losing a set 6–1, with the straight shape of the one supposedly being reminiscent of the straight shape of a breadstick. See also bagel.
- Break back: To win a game as the receiving player or team immediately after losing the previous game as the serving player or team.
- Break point: Point which, if won by the receiver, would result in a break of service; arises when the score is 30–40 or 40–ad. A double break point or two break points arises at 15–40; a triple break point or three break points arises at 0–40.
- Break: To win a game as the receiving player or team, thereby breaking serve. At high level of play the server is more likely to win a game, so breaks are often key moments of a match. Noun: break (service break) (e.g. "to be a break down" means "to have, in a set, one break fewer than the opponent", "to be a double break up" means "to have, in a set, two breaks more than the opponent").
- Breaker: Colloquial term for tiebreak.
- Brutaliser: Hitting the ball directly at the opponent.
- Buggy whip: Forehand hit with a follow-through that does not go across the body and finish on the opposite side, but rather goes from low to high, crosses the opposite shoulder (optionally) and finishes on the same side (similar to the driver of a horse-drawn carriage whipping a horse). Used, for example, by Rafael Nadal (racket head crosses the opposite shoulder) and Maria Sharapova (racket head stays on the same shoulder).
- Bumper guard: A piece of plastic that protects the outside of the upper-half of the racket head.
- Bye: Automatic advancement of a player to the next round of a tournament without facing an opponent. Byes are often awarded in the first round to the top-seeded players in a tournament.
- Bunt: To use the power of the opponent's shot and hit it back with a short swing.

== C ==
A tennis court with its dimensions and components

- Call: Verbal utterance by a line judge or chair umpire declaring that a ball landed outside the valid area of play.
- Canadian doubles: Informal and unsanctioned variation of tennis played with three players—two on one side of the court and one on the other. The team of two players can only hit the ball within the single player's singles lines, whilst the single player can hit into the full doubles court on the doubles team's side. See also: American doubles.
- Can opener: Serve hit by a right-handed player with slice, landing on or near the intersection of the singles tramline and service line in the deuce court (or in the ad court for a left-handed server).
- Cannonball: A very fast, flat or "big" serve. Term most popular in the 1970s and 80s.
- Career Golden Slam: In addition to having won all four major titles in their career, a player that has also won an Olympic gold medal is said to have achieved a career Golden Slam. Only five players have ever achieved this in singles: Steffi Graf (1988), Andre Agassi (1996), Rafael Nadal (2010), Serena Williams (2012), and Novak Djokovic (2024). The term is rarely used in doubles, although the feat has been more common in that discipline. It has been achieved individually by nine wheelchair tennis players and four able-bodied players (Pam Shriver, Gigi Fernández, Daniel Nestor, Mate Pavić), and by three teams (The Woodies, the Williams sisters, and the Bryan brothers). Tennis at the Olympics was not played from 1928 to 1984.
- Career Grand Slam (or career slam): Players who have won all four major championships over the course of their career (but not within the same calendar year) are said to have won a career Grand Slam.
- Carpet court: A surface for tennis courts consisting of textile or polymer materials supplied in rolls. Previously common for indoor professional events, the surface was dropped from major pro tournaments in 2009. See carpet court.
- Carve: To hit a groundstroke shot with a combination of sidespin and underspin.
- Centre mark: Small mark located at the centre of the baseline. When serving the player must stand on the correct side of the mark corresponding with the score.
- Chair umpire: See umpire.
- Challenge Round: Final round of a tournament, in which the winner of a single-elimination phase faces the previous year's champion, who plays only that one match. The challenge round was used in the early history of Wimbledon (from 1877 through 1921) and the US Open (from 1884 through 1911), and, until 1972, in the Davis Cup.
- Challenge: When a player requests an official review of the spot where the ball landed, using electronic ball tracking technology. See Hawk-Eye. Challenges are only available in some large tournaments.
- Challenger: A tour of tournaments one level below the top-tier ATP Tour. Currently, Challenger tournaments compose the ATP Challenger Tour. Players, generally ranked around world no. 80 to world no. 300, compete on the Challenger tour in an effort to gain ranking points which allow them to gain entry to tournaments on the ATP Tour.
- Champions tiebreak: See super tiebreak.
- Change-over (or change of ends): 90 second rest time after every odd-numbered game when the players change ends.
- Chip and charge: Type of approach shot which involves hitting a slice shot while rapidly moving forward and following the shot into the net. Aimed at putting the opponent under pressure.
- Chip: Blocking a shot with underspin, creating a low trajectory.
- Chop: Shot hit with extreme underspin, opposite of topspin.
- Circuit: The yearly group of sanctioned tennis tournaments.
- Clay (or clay court, claycourt): a natural surface made of crushed shale, stone, brick or clay on which tennis is played, most notably at the French Open. See: clay court.
- Claycourter (or clay-courter, clay courter): Player who is particularly proficient or a specialist on clay courts.
- Closed tournament: Entries to "closed" tournaments are restricted, normally by a requirement of residency within a specified geographic area.
- Closed stance: Classic technique in which the ball is hit while the hitter's body is facing at an angle between parallel to the baseline and with their back turned to the opponent.
- Code violation: a rule violation at a men's and women's professional tour match called by the chair umpire which results in a player receiving an official warning or a penalty. The first violation results in a warning; the second, a point penalty; the third and successive violations, a game penalty each. A code violation may also be judged severe enough to result in the player having to forfeit the match immediately (without having to go through the three or more automatic penalty stages). There often follows additional monetary fine for each code violation.
- Consolation singles: Players who lost their first match in a tournament are eligible.
- Consolidate (a break): To hold serve in the game immediately following a break of serve.
- Continental grip: way of holding the racket in which the bottom knuckle of the index finger is in contact with the top of the handle and the heel of the hand with the bevel directly clockwise from it.
- Counterpuncher: Defensive baseliner. See tennis strategy.
- Court: Area designated for playing a game of tennis.
- Cross-over: Player crossing the net into the opponent's court. It can be done either in a friendly fashion, or maliciously, thereby invoking a code violation. The latter sometimes happens when it is uncertain whether the ball on a decisive point landed inside or outside the court when playing on clay, thus leaving a mark.
- Crosscourt shot: Hitting the ball diagonally into the opponent's court.
- Cut-throat tennis (or cutthroat tennis): see American doubles.
- Cyclops: Device formerly used at Wimbledon and other tournaments to detect a serve that landed long, past the service line. The device emitted an audible noise when the serve was long. Succeeded by Hawk-Eye.

== D ==
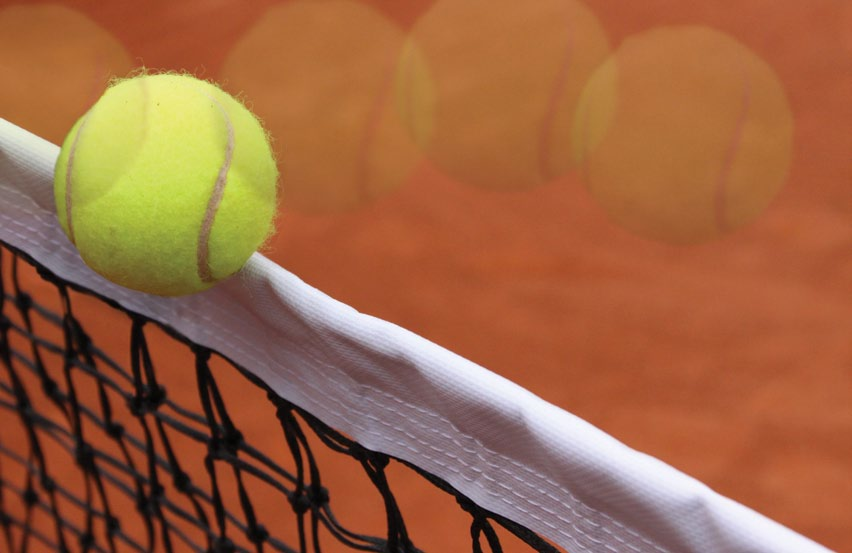
An example of a dead net cord

- Dampener A small rubber device affixed to the strings of the racket to absorb some of the vibration caused by hitting the ball.
- Davis Cup: International, annual men's tennis competition in which teams from participating countries compete in a single-elimination format, with matches occurring at several stages during the year.
- Dead ball: An old ball which has lost its bounce, and is thus unusable. Dead balls have a distinct hollow noise when hit.
- Dead net (or dead net cord): Situation in which a player scores by inadvertently hitting the ball in such a way that it touches the upper cord of the net and rolls over to the other side; the player is said to have "gotten (caught) a dead net (dead net cord)" and considered to be lucky.
- Dead rubber: Davis/Billie Jean King Cup match which is played after the victor of the tie has already been decided. Dead rubbers may or may not be played, depending on the coaches' agreement to do so, and are usually best of three, instead of five, sets. Typically, players who play the dead rubber are lower-ranked members of the team looking to gain Davis/BJK Cup match experience.
- Deciding point: In doubles, the point played when the game score reaches deuce and there is no ad play; the game is decided in favor of whichever team wins the deuce point.
- Deep shot: Shot that lands near the baseline, as opposed to near the net or mid-court.
- Default: Disqualification of a player in a match by the chair umpire after the player has received four code violation warnings, generally for their conduct on court. A default can occur with less than four code violations warnings if the code violation is judged severe enough to warrant it. A double default occurs when both players are disqualified. Defaults also occur when a player misses a match with no valid excuse. Defaults are considered losses.
- Deuce court: Right side of the court of each player, so called because it is the area into which the ball is served when the score is deuce.
- Deuce: Score of 40–40 in a game. A player must win two consecutive points from a deuce to win the game, unless the tournament employs deciding points, as in the 2010 ATP World Tour Finals. A player who has won one point after deuce is said to have the advantage.
- Dig: A shot where the player hits the ball just before the second bounce. So named because the racket is positioned in a downward position, similar to a shovel digging a hole.
- Dink: Onomatopoetic term for a shot with little pace, usually hit close to the net.
- Direct acceptance ("DA"): The process followed for the bulk of players who enter and are selected for a tournament by ranking. The term "DA" may be used specifically where a player's ATP or WTA ranking would be insufficient to gain entry into a tournament, but they are selected based on an ITF ranking, top 500 national ranking, or randomly if the player is unranked but more direct entry spots are needed to fill the draw.
- Dirtballer: Colloquial term for a clay court specialist.
- Double bagel: Two sets won to love; see bagel.
- Double break point: A situation where the receiver has two consecutive break point opportunities in game, or a score of 15–40.
- Double break (or double-break): An advantage of two breaks of service in a set.
- Double fault: Two serving faults in a row in one point, causing the player serving to lose the point.
- Double-handed backhand (or double-hander): See two-handed backhand.
- Double-handed forehand (or double-hander): See two-handed forehand.
- Doubles net: A net used for playing doubles; longer than a singles net.
- Doubles: Match played by four players, two per side of the court. A doubles court is 9 ft (2.97m) wider than a singles court.
- Down the line: Ball hit straight along the sideline to the opponent's side of the court.
- Draw: The schedule of matches in a tennis tournament. The starting fixtures are determined by a combined process of player seeding and random selection, and may or may not involve a public draw ceremony. A qualifying draw is set up to arrange the starting lineup of the qualifying competition (qualies), from where unseeded players qualify for a place in the starting lineup or the main draw of the tournament.
- Drive volley (or drive-volley, swing volley): a tennis volley executed with full swing or topspin drive, thus with pace and conventionally at shoulder height; in the manner of a forehand or backhand swing.
- Drive: Groundstroke hit with a flat trajectory.
- Drop (a set): to lose (the set)
- Drop shot (colloquial: dropper): Play in which the player hits the ball lightly enough to just go over the net, usually with backspin; designed to catch a player who is away from the net off guard.
- Drop volley: Drop shot executed from a volley position.
- Dual match: A team competition format used at the college level in the US. In NCAA Division I, a dual match consists of three one-set doubles matches and six singles matches. One point is awarded to the team that wins two or more of the doubles sets, and six more points are awarded for each singles win. The winner of the dual match is the team with four or more of the seven points.

== E ==
- Elbow: Corner of the baseline and the doubles alley.
- Emergency substitution ("ES"): ATP Tour 250 Tournaments qualify for one emergency substitution if the following conditions exist : i) Two of the tournament's top four seeds on the original acceptance list withdraw; and ii) One of the withdrawals involves the first or second seeded player; and iii) The substitute player meets a minimum of one of the following criteria: 1. A former top 20 player on the Pepperstone ATP rankings within the previous 5 years from the tournament date. 2. Past tournament champion. 3. A current player ranked in the top 5 on the current ITF International Junior Ranking. 4. A current player ranked in the top 2 of the host country official National Junior Ranking. To be eligible for the emergency substitution, the tournament must have declared their wild cards to the ATP prior to the withdrawal of the player that qualified them for the emergency substitution.
- Entry system: Ranking system used by the ATP and WTA tours, so named because it determines whether a player has a sufficiently high ranking to gain direct acceptance (not as a qualifier or wild card) into the main draw of a tournament. A player's Entry System ranking is different from their Race ranking, which is reset to zero at the beginning of each year. A player carries points and the associated Entry ranking continuously unless those points are lost at a tournament at which the player had previously earned them.
- Error: A shot that does not land (correctly) in the opponent's court, resulting in the loss of a point.
- Exhibition: Tournament in which players compete for the purpose of entertaining the crowd or raising money, but not ranking points on the ATP or WTA tours.

== F ==
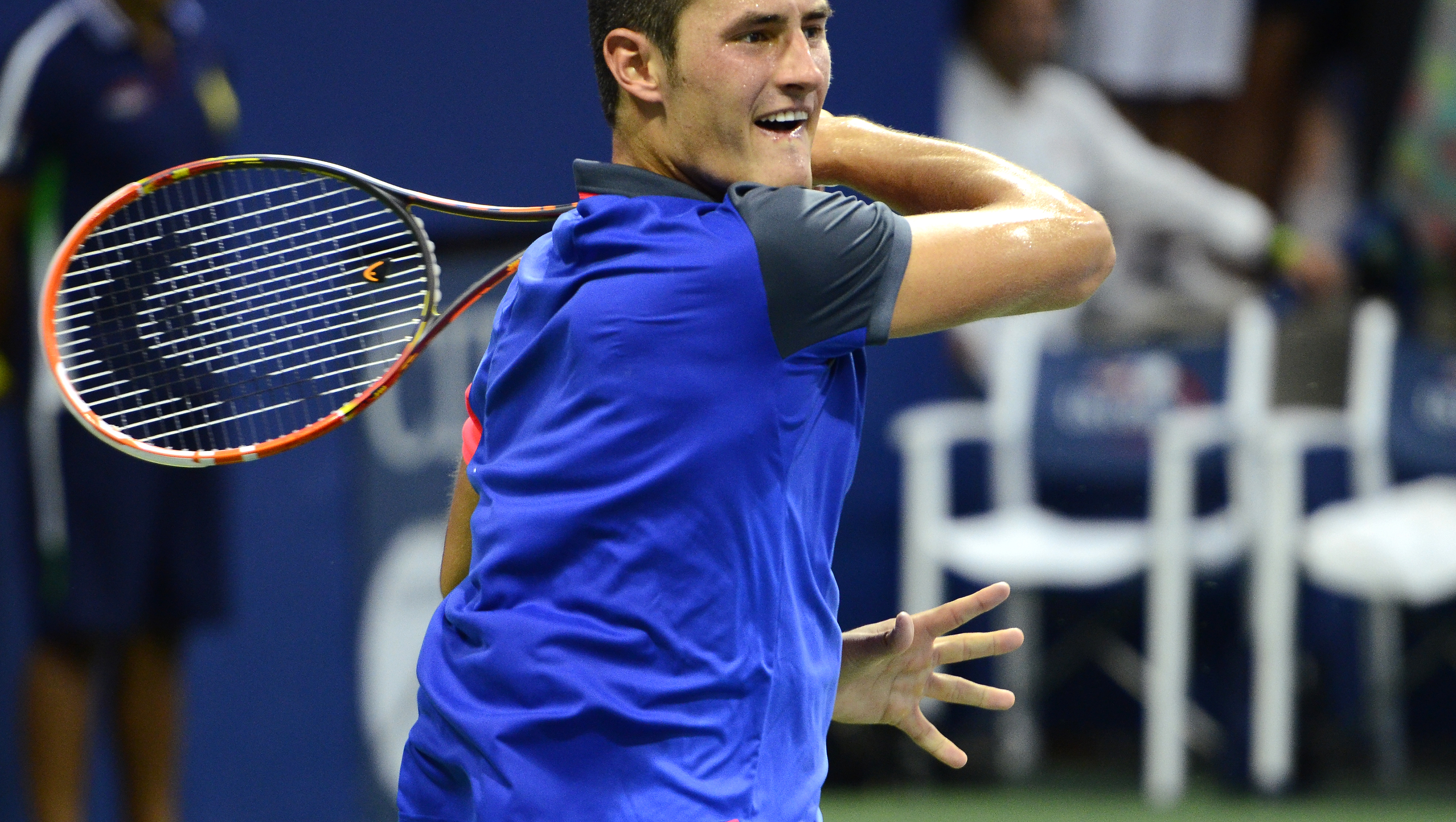
Example of a follow through action after the ball is hit

- Fault: Serve that fails to land the ball in the opponent's service box, therefore not starting the point. See also double fault and foot fault.
- Fed Cup (or Federation Cup): See Billie Jean King Cup.
- First serve: The first of the two attempts to serve that a player is allowed at the beginning of a point. A let serve that lands inbounds does not count as a serve.
- Five: Number of games completed (e.g. "7–5" is spoken as "seven–five"), or a spoken abbreviation of "15" in points (e.g. a score of 40–15 is sometimes spoken as "forty–five").
- Flat (or flat shot): Shot with relatively little spin and usually hard-hit.
- Flatliner: Player who hits the ball flat with a very low trajectory with exceptional depth and accuracy. Examples include Andre Agassi and Lindsay Davenport.
- Follow through: Portion of a swing after the ball is hit.
- Foot fault (or footfault): Type of service fault in which a player, during the serve, steps on or over the baseline into the court before striking the ball. A foot fault may also occur if the player steps on or across the center hash mark and its imaginary perpendicular extension from the baseline to the net. The definition of a foot fault has changed several times since the introduction of (lawn) tennis.
- Forced error: Error caused by an opponent's good play; contrasted with an unforced error. Counting forced errors as well as unforced errors is partly subjective.
- Forehand: Stroke in which the player hits the ball with the front of the racket hand facing the ball; contrasted with backhand.
- Frame shot (or frame, wood shot): A mishit on the frame of the racket rather than the strings.
- Fry: See breadstick.
- Futures: Series of men's tour tennis tournaments which compose the ITF Men's Circuit, a tour two levels below the ATP Tour and one level below the ATP Challenger Tour. Players compete in Futures events (generally when ranked below world no. 300 or so) to garner enough ranking points to gain entry into Challenger events.

== G ==
- Game point: Situation in which the server is leading and needs one more point to win the game. See also break point.
- Game, set, match: Expression used at the conclusion of a match to indicate that one of the competitors has prevailed.
- Game: A game consists of a sequence of points played with the same player serving and is a segment of a set. Each set consists of at least six games.
- Get: Reaching and returning a ball that is difficult to retrieve.
- Ghost in to the net: To approach the net from the baseline while the opposing player is focused on retrieving a ball and therefore unaware that the player is approaching the net.
- Golden set: A set that is won without dropping a single point.
- Golden Slam: Winning the Grand Slam and the tennis Olympic gold medal in a calendar year. This has been achieved once by Steffi Graf in 1988. See also Career Golden Slam.
- Grand Slam: Winning all four of the prestigious major tournaments in a calendar year. "Grand Slam" is also commonly used to refer to any one of the four tournaments: the Australian Open, the French Open (Roland Garros), Wimbledon, and the US Open. See also Career Grand Slam.
- Grass (or grass court): A natural turf surface tennis is played on, most notably at Wimbledon. See: grass court.
- Grasscourter (or grass-courter, grass courter): Player who is particularly proficient or a specialist on grass courts.
- Grinding: Playing out points with a series of shots from the baseline. See also attrition.
- Grip: A way of holding the racket in order to hit shots during a match. The three most commonly used conventional grips are the Continental, the Eastern and the Western. Most players change grips during a match depending on which shot they are hitting. For further information on grips, including all the types, see grip (tennis).
- Grommet strip: A strip of plastic containing small tubes that are placed in the frame's string holes to prevent the strings from rubbing against the abrasive frame.
- Groundie: Colloquial word for a groundstroke.
- Groundstroke: Forehand or backhand shot that is executed after the ball bounces once on the court.
- Grunting: Noises made by players while either serving or hitting the ball.
- Gut: Type of racket string. Can be made from catgut or synthetic gut.

== H ==
- Hacker: Player whose clumsy strokes seem more accidental than intentional.
- Hail Mary: Extremely high lob, for defensive purposes.
- Half court: The area of the court in the vicinity of the service line.
- Half volley: A groundstroke shot made immediately after a bounce or simultaneous to the bounce and played with the racket close to the ground.
- Handicapping A system in which competitors are given advantages or compensations to equalize the chances of winning.
- Hardcourt (or hard court): A type of court which is made of asphalt or concrete with a synthetic/acrylic layer on top. They can vary in color and tend to play medium-fast to fast.
- Hardcourter (or hard-courter, hard courter): Player who is particularly proficient or a specialist on hard courts.
- Hawk-Eye Live: Advanced version of the Hawk-Eye technology that calls shots in or out in real time (through speakers), fully replacing human line judges.
- Hawk-Eye: Computer system connected to cameras to track the path of the ball for replay purposes; used with the player challenge system to contest and review designated line calls.
- Head (or racket head): Portion of the racket that contains the strings.
- Heavy (ball): Ball hit with so much topspin that it feels "heavy" when the opposing player strikes it.
- Hit and giggle: non-competitive social tennis.
- Hitting partner (or sparring partner): specialist employed by a tennis player to practice strokes during training.
- Hold (or hold serve): To win the game when serving. Compare break.
- Hot Dog: A shot where the player hits the ball between their legs.

== I ==
- I-formation: Formation used in doubles where the net player on the serving team crouches roughly at the centre service line; used mainly to counter teams that prefer a crosscourt return.
- Inside-in: Running around the backhand side to hit a forehand down the line. Vice versa for inside in backhand.
- Inside-out: Running around the backhand side and hitting a crosscourt forehand. Vice versa for inside out backhand.
- Insurance break: Break that achieves an overall advantage of two breaks of serve.
- IPIN: Abbreviation for International Player Identification Number, a registration number required for all professional tennis players and administered by the governing body ITF.
- ITF entry: High-ranking ITF players can be awarded a spot into ATP Challenger and ITF women's tournaments main draws based on their ITF ranking.
- ITF: Abbreviation for International Tennis Federation, the governing body of world tennis. Founded in 1913 as the International Lawn Tennis Federation (ILTF).

== J ==
- Jamming: Serving or returning straight into the opponent's body.
- Junior exempt ("JE"): High-ranking junior players can be awarded a spot in the draw of a tournament through the ITF's junior exempt project.
- Junior ranking ("JR"): High-ranking junior players can be awarded a spot in the main draw of a Challenger tournament through the ITF Junior Accelerator Programme. This program replaced the junior exempt project.
- Junk ball: A shot or return stroke in which the ball tends to be slow and possibly also without spin; often introduced unpredictably to upset the flow of the game and the rhythm of the opposition.
- Junk baller (or junkballer): Player that hits junk balls; often used in a derogative manner.

== K ==
- Kick serve: Type of spin serve that bounces high. Introduced in the United States in the late 1880s and called the American twist.
- Knock-up: Practice or warm-up session without scoring which usually precedes the start of competitive play.
- Kenin-Hold: This is used to describe a game, where the server holds the game from 0–40 down by hitting 5 consecutive winners in the due process of holding his/her serve. This has been termed after 2020 Australian Open champion Sofia Kenin, who infamously held her serve from 0–40 down in the final against two-time Grandslam champion Garbiñe Muguruza.

== L ==
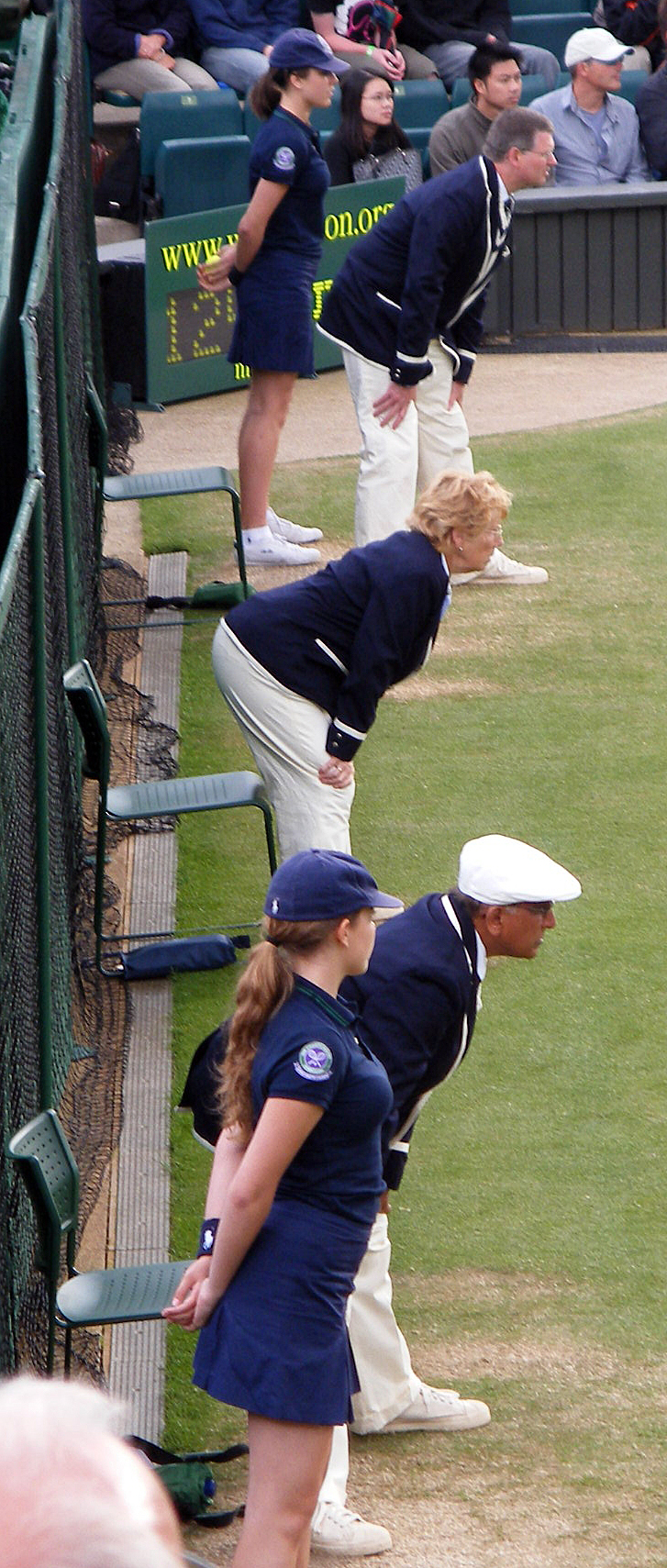
Line judges at Wimbledon

- Last direct ("LD"): a player with the lowest rank/rating allowed to participate directly in the tournament.
- Late Entry ("LE"): A Late Entry spot is a reserved position (one) in each ATP Tour 250 tournament. Only players with a ranking better than the original tournament entry list cut are allowed to enter.
- Lawn tennis: "Regular" tennis, as opposed to real tennis, the game from which tennis is derived. Reflects the fact that the game was first played on grass.
- Let-check: Electronic sensor on the net that assists chair umpires in calling lets by detecting vibration. Typically, it is used only on show courts in professional matches, like electronic review. Players and commentators occasionally complain that such devices are too sensitive, that is, indicate too many false positives.
- Let: A call that requires the point to be replayed. The umpire indicates this type of let by announcing "Let. First serve", or "Let. Second serve." Lets typically occur when an otherwise-valid serve makes contact with the net before hitting the ground. Theoretically, a player could serve an unlimited number of otherwise-valid let serves, but a serve that touches the net and then lands out of bounds counts as one of the two allowed serves. A let can also be called during play when there is some distraction to either player not caused by the players themselves, such as a ball boy moving behind a receiver, debris flying across the court in windy conditions, or a ball accidentally falling out of a player's pocket or entering from a neighboring court. The call is made by the chair umpire when one is assigned to the match, as in professional matches, or one of the players when there is no chair umpire. When a receiver is legitimately unprepared for a serve, a let is technically the result, even if the word goes unspoken.
- Line call (or call): Call made by the line judge. A call of 'out' will be made in combination with an outstretched arm pointing sideways if a ball lands outside the court and if the ball is 'in', i.e. lands on or within the outer lines, this is indicated by holding both hands flattened and the arms stretched downwards.
- Line judge (or linesman, lineswoman or line umpire): Person designated to observe the passage of tennis balls over the boundary lines of the court. A line judge can declare that a play was inside or outside the play area and cannot be overruled by the players. Line judges must defer to an umpire's decision, even when it contradicts their own observations.
- Lingering death tiebreak: Version of the tiebreak played as the best of twelve points, with a two-point advantage needed to clinch the set.
- Lob volley: Type of volley shot aimed at lobbing the ball over the opponent and normally played when the opponent is in the vicinity of the net.
- Lob: Stroke in which the ball is hit high above the net. If the opposing player or players are up at the net, the intention may be an offensive lob in order to win the point outright. In a defensive lob, the intent is to give the player time to recover and get in position, or, if the opponents are at the net, to force them to chase down the lob. See also moonball.
- Long: A call to indicate that the ball has landed out of court, beyond the baseline.
- Love game: Shutout game, won without the opponent scoring a single point.
- Love hold: Game won by the server without the opponent scoring a single point.
- Love: A score of zero (e.g. "15-0" is spoken "fifteen-love"; "to hold to love" means "to win the game when serving with the opponent scoring zero points"; "to break to love" means "to win the game when receiving with the opponent scoring zero points"). Thought to be derived from the French term, l'oeuf, literally the egg, meaning nothing; less popular alternative theory claiming it to be from the Dutch word lof doen, meaning honour.
- Lucky loser ("LL"): Highest-ranked player to lose in the final round of qualifying for a tournament, but still ends up qualifying because of a sudden withdrawal by one of the players already in the main draw. In Grand Slam events, one of the four highest-ranked losers in the final qualifying round is randomly picked as the lucky loser.

== M ==
- Mac-Cam: High-speed video camera used for televised instant replays of close shots landing on/near the baseline. Name derived from John McEnroe.
- Masters Cup (or Tennis Masters Cup) Former name of the year-end ATP championship, in which the eight highest-ranked players compete in a round-robin format. See ATP Finals.
- Masters: Colloquial name for a tournament in the ATP Tour Masters 1000 category on the ATP Tour.
- Match: A contest between two players (singles match) or two teams of players (doubles match), normally played as the best of three or five sets.
- Match point: Situation in which the player who is leading needs one more point to win the match. Variations of the term are possible; e.g. championship point is the match point in the final match of a championship or a gold medal point is the match point in the final match of the Olympics.
- Mercedes Super 9: Former name for the nine ATP Tour Masters 1000 tournaments.
- Match tiebreak: A final set played under a tiebreak or super tiebreak format. The match tiebreak is used in ATP and WTA doubles tournaments, as well as the Australian Open, US Open and French Open mixed doubles tournaments.
- Mini-break: Point won from the opponent's serve. The term is usually used in a tiebreak, but it can be used during normal service games as well. To be "up a mini-break" means that the player has one more mini-break than the opponent.
- Mini-hold: Point won by the server, usually in a tiebreak.
- MIPTC: Abbreviation for Men's International Professional Tennis Council, administrative body of the tournaments that composed the Grand Prix tennis circuit. Existed from 1974 until the creation of the ATP Tour in 1989.
- Mis-hit (or mishit): Stroke in which the racket fails to make contact with the ball in the "sweetspot" area of the strings.
- Mixed doubles: Match played by four players, two male, two female, one of each sex per side of the court.
- Moonball: A type of groundstroke that is hit with much topspin, usually with the forehand, to create a high, slow, floating shot that lands close to the opponent's baseline. See also lob.
- MOP: Point at 0–30; stands for major opportunity point.
- Main draw: See draw.

== N ==
- Net cord: See dead net cord.
- Net point: Point won or lost on approaching the net, as opposed to a point won or lost by a stroke from the baseline.
- Net out: Fault occurred when the ball hits the net and lands outside the court during a serve.
- Net posts: Posts on each side of the court which hold up the net. The net posts are placed 3 feet (0.914 m) outside the doubles court on each side, unless a singles net is used, in which case the posts are placed 3 feet (0.914 m) outside the singles court.
- Net sticks (or singles sticks): Pair of poles placed on the singles line to support the net during a singles match.
- Net: Interlaced fabric, cord, and tape stretched across the entire width of the court; it is held up by the posts.
- New balls: A new set of balls replacing an old set, usually after seven or nine games have been played (the knock-up counts as two games), and requested by the chair umpire calling for "new balls, please." A necessary move since constant strokes cause balls to heat up and lose pressure and velocity, which leads to an alteration of their bounce characteristics. As a courtesy, the player first to serve a new ball will show it to their opponent before serving.
- No ad scoring: Game format in which the player who wins the first point after deuce wins the game. The receiver determines whether the server serves to the deuce or ad court. Typically used in matches with time constraints.
- No-man's land: Area between the service line and the baseline, where a player is most vulnerable.
- Non-endemic products: Products for tennis sponsorship that are not intrinsic to the sport such as watches, cars, jewelry.
- Not up: Call given by the umpire when a player plays a ball that has already bounced twice, i.e. the ball was out of play when the player played it.
- NTRP rating: National Tennis Rating Program rating; system used in the United States to rank players on a scale from 1 to 7, with 1 being an absolute beginner and 7 a touring pro.

== O ==
- Official: Member of the officiating team: tournament referee, chair umpire, or linesman.
- On one's racket: A situation in which a player can win the match, set, or tiebreak by holding serve. This occurs when a player breaks the opponent's serve or achieves a mini break in a tiebreak.
- On serve: Situation where both players or teams have the same number of breaks in a set. While on serve, neither player or team can win the set without a break of serve. An advantage set requires at least one break to win.
- One-handed backhand (or single-handed backhand, single-hander, one-hander, oney): Backhand stroke hit with one hand on the grip.
- One-two punch: When a server wins a point in two shots, where the second shot results in a winner or an opponent's forced error due to the positioning of both players after the serve.
- Open: A pre-open era term used to indicate a tournament open to all comers of any nationality as opposed 'closed' tournaments for nationals of the country concerned.
- Open Era: Period in tennis which began in 1968 when tournaments became open to both amateurs and professional players.
- Open stance: Modern technique in which the hitter's body facing is at an angle between parallel to the baseline and facing the opponent. See also closed stance.
- OP: Stands for opportunity point; 15–30, an opportunity to potentially break serve.
- Order of play ("OOP"): Schedule of matches in a tennis tournament.
- On-site entry ("OSE"): The process by which vacant slots in a doubles tournament are filled by teams who physically sign up for the draw and are selected based on ranking cut-offs.
- Out: An error in which the ball lands outside the playing area.
- Overgrip (or overwrap): padded tape spirally wrapped over the handle or grip of the racket to absorb moisture or add gripping assistance.
- Overhead: Stroke in which the player hits the ball over their head; if the shot is hit relatively strongly, it is referred to as a smash; smashes are often referred to as simply overheads, although not every overhead shot is a smash.
- Overrule: To reverse a call made by a line judge, done by the umpire.

== P ==
- Pace: The speed and power of the ball after it is struck by the racket. Pace is used to control the tempo of the game.
- Paint the lines: To hit shots that land as close to the lines of the court as possible.
- Pass (or passing shot): Type of shot, usually played in the vicinity of the baseline, that passes by (not over) the opponent at the net. See also lob.
- Percentage tennis: Style of play consisting of safe shots with large margins of error. Aimed at keeping the ball in play in anticipation of an opponent's error.
- Perfect Game: A game in which the server holds his or her serve by hitting four consecutive aces.
- Ping it: To hit an offensive shot and place the ball deep to the corners of the court.
- Poaching (noun: poach): In doubles, an aggressive move where the player at the net moves to volley a shot intended for their partner.
- Point penalty: Point awarded to a player's opponent following successive code violations.
- Point: Period of play between the first successful service of a ball and the point at which that ball goes out of play. It is the smallest unit of scoring in tennis.
- Pre-qualifying: Tournament in which the winner(s) earn a wild card into a tournament's qualifying draw.
- Pressureless ball: Special type of tennis ball that does not have a core of pressurized air as standard balls do, but rather has a core made of solid rubber, or a core filled tightly with micro-particles. Quality pressureless balls are approved for top-pro play generally, but pressureless balls are typically used mostly at high altitudes, where standard balls would be greatly affected by the difference between the high pressure in the ball and the thin air.
- Protected ranking ("PR") or Special ranking ("SR") : Players injured for a minimum of six months can ask for a protected ranking, which is based on their average ranking during the first three months of their injury. The player can use their protected ranking to enter tournaments' main draws or qualifying competitions when coming back from injury (or some occurrences such as COVID-19 frozen ranking concerns in 2020–21). It is not used for seeding purposes. It is also used in the WTA for players returning from pregnancy leave.
- Pull the trigger: To hit a powerful offensive shot, particularly after patiently waiting for the right opportunity to arise during a rally.
- Pulp: 30–30, not quite deuce (a pun on the homophone "juice").
- Pusher: Player who does not try to hit winners, but only to return the ball safely; often used in a derogative manner.
- Putaway: Offensive shot to try to end the point with no hope of a return.

== Q ==
- Qualies: Short for qualification rounds or similar.
- Qualification round: Final round of play in a pre-tournament qualification competition, also known as qualies.
- Qualifier ("Q"): Player who reaches the tournament's main draw by competing in a pre-tournament qualifying competition instead of automatically qualified by virtue of their world ranking, being a wild card, or other exemption.
- Qualifying draw: See draw.

== R ==
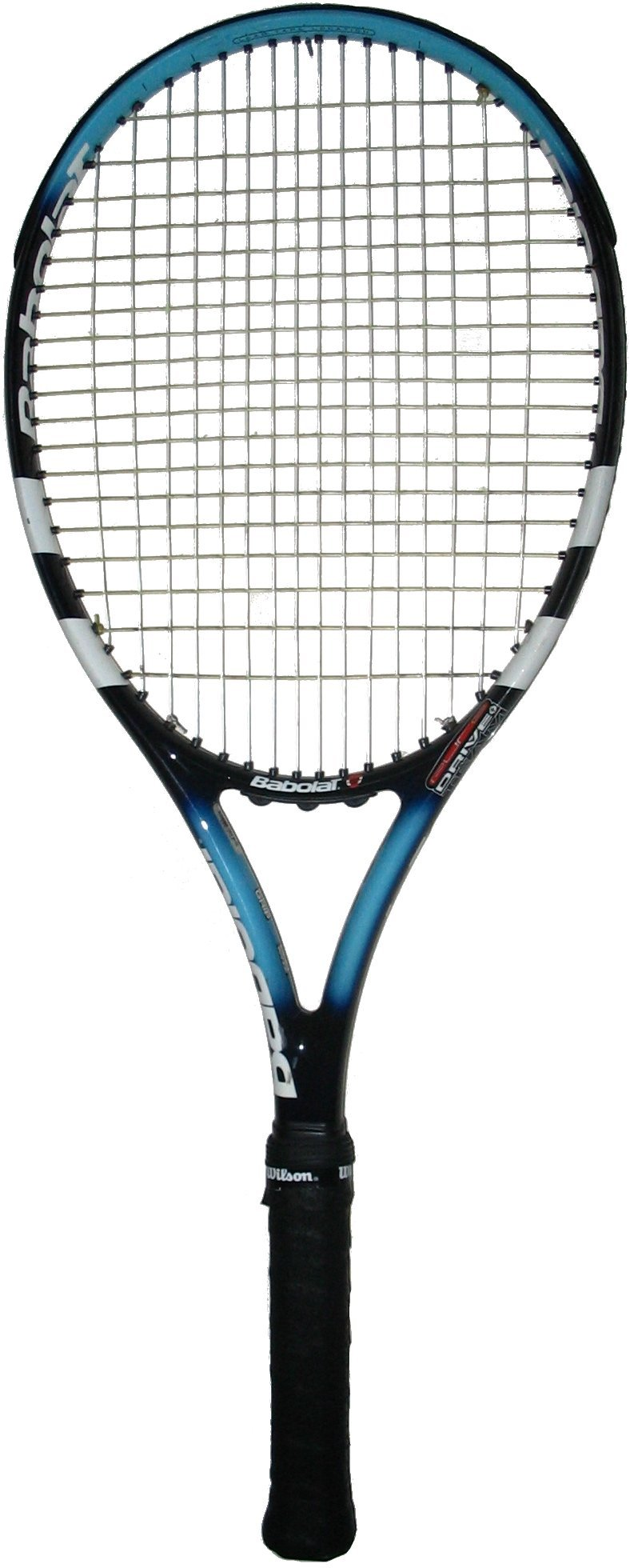
A modern tennis racket

- Racket (or racquet): Bat with a long handle and a large looped frame with a string mesh tautly stretched across it, the frame made of wood, metal, graphite, composite, or some other synthetic material, used by a tennis player to hit the tennis ball during a game of tennis.
- Racket abuse (racquet abuse): When a player slams their racket into the ground or net in frustration. Can result in a warning from the umpire or docking of points.
- Rally: Following the service of a tennis ball, a series of return hits of the ball that ends when one or other player fails to return the ball within the court boundary or fails to return a ball that falls within the play area.
- Rankings: A hierarchical listing of players based on their recent achievements. Used to determine qualification for entry and seeding in tournaments.
- Rating: A system used by national tennis organizations to group players of comparable skills. The rating of players is dependent on their match record.
- Real tennis (also royal tennis or court tennis): An indoor racket sport which was the predecessor of the modern game of (lawn) tennis. The term real is used as a retronym to distinguish the ancient game from the modern game of lawn tennis. Known also as court tennis in the United States or royal tennis in Australia.
- Receiver: Player who is receiving the service of the opponent.
- Referee: Person in charge of enforcing the rules in a tournament, as opposed to a tennis match. See also umpire.
- Reflex volley: Volley in which the player has no time to plan the shot, and instead reacts instinctively to get the racket in position to return the ball. This occurs frequently in doubles and in advanced singles.
- Registered player: A designation used during the beginning of the Open Era to identify a category of amateur tennis players who were allowed to compete for prize money but stayed under the control of their national associations.
- Retirement ("ret."): Player's withdrawal during a match, causing the player to forfeit the tournament. Usually this happens due to injury. For a pre-match withdrawal, see walkover.
- Retriever: Defensive baseliner who relies on returning the ball rather than scoring direct winners. See tennis strategy.
- Return: Stroke made by the receiver of a service.
- Return ace: Shot in which the opponent serves, the receiver returns the serve, and the opponent does not hit the ball.
- Rising shot: Shot in which the ball is hit before it reaches its apex; also hitting on the rise.
- Round of 16: Round of a tournament prior to the quarterfinals in which there are 16 players remaining, corresponds to the fourth round of 128-draw tournament, the third round of a 64-draw, and second round of a 32-draw tournament.
- Round robin ("RR"): Tournament format in which players are organised into groups of three or four players and compete against all other members of the group. Players are then ranked according to number of matches, sets, and games won and head-to-head records. The top one, two, or four players then qualify for the next stage of the tournament.
- Rubber: Individual match, singles or doubles, within a Davis Cup or Billie Jean King Cup tie.
- Run around the ball: To quickly move laterally on the court during a rally so as to be able to hit a forehand instead of a backhand, or vice versa.

== S ==
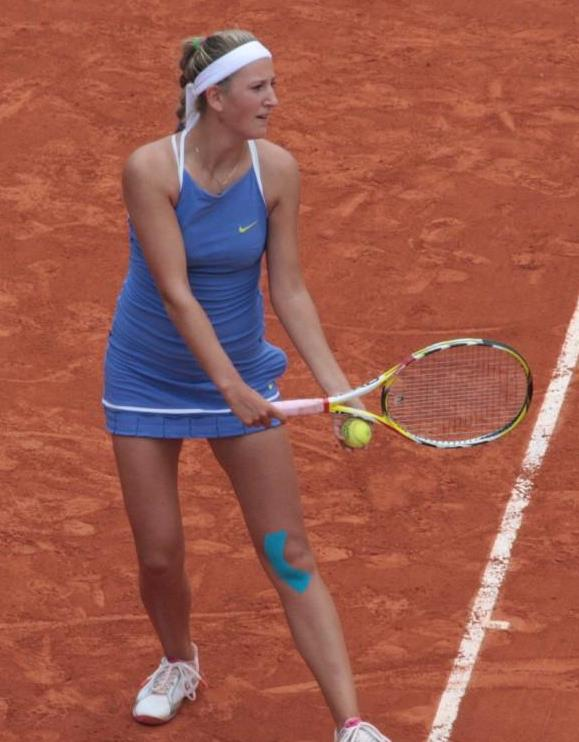
Preparing to serve to start a point

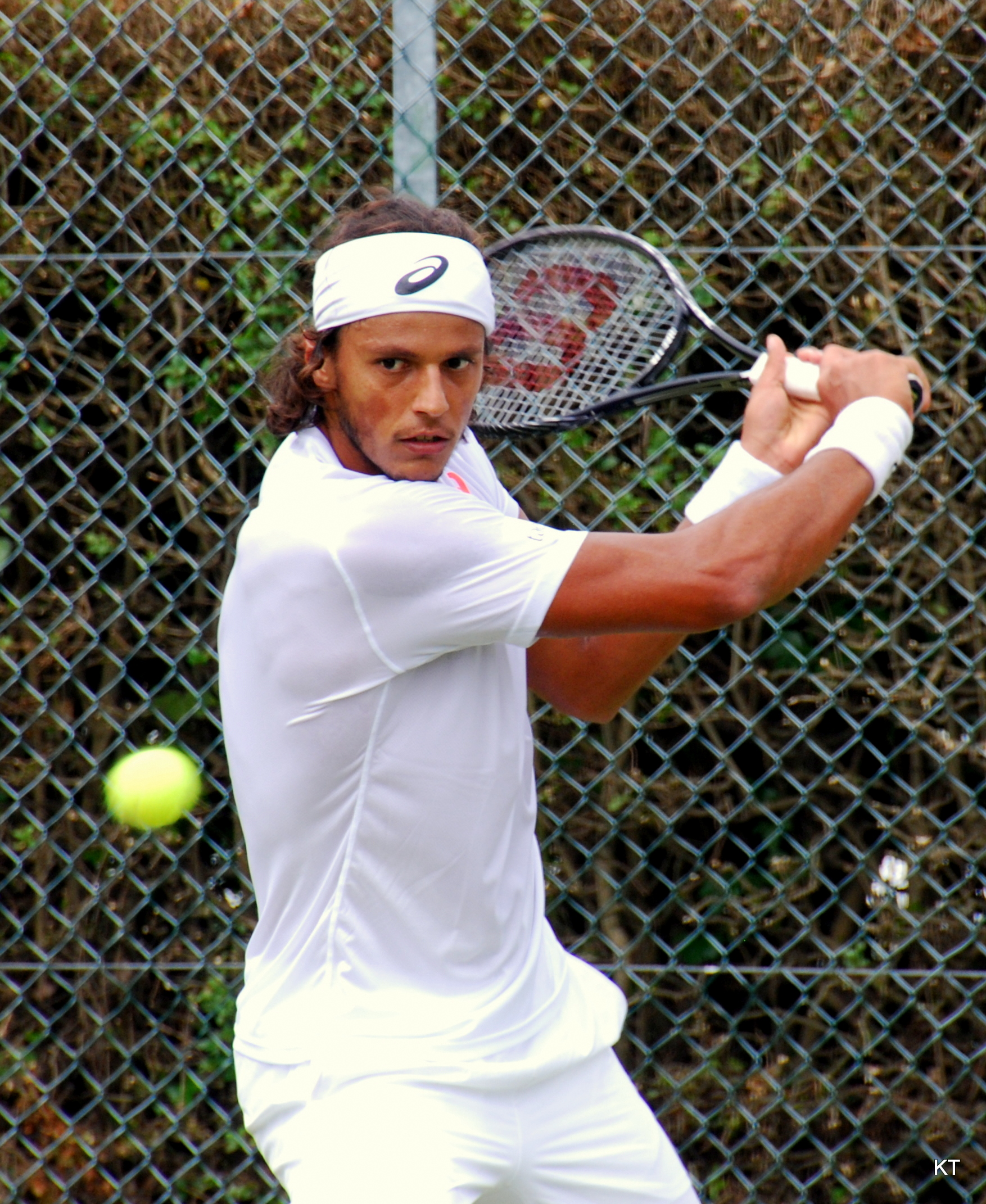
Player preparing to hit a backhand slice shot

- SABR (spoken "saber"; short for Sneak Attack By Roger): a return strategy where a tennis player suddenly moves forward to the service line and returns the opponent's serve with a half-volley or a chip-and-charge shot.
- Satellite: Intermediate junior level of play, equivalent of Level 6.
- Scoring: Method of tracking progress of a match. A match consists of points, game and sets.
- Scratch: Withdrawal from a match due to an injury.
- Second serve (or second service): Second and final of the two serve attempts a player is allowed at the beginning of a point, not counting net cord let serves that would otherwise be good.
- Second snap: a tennis ball struck for top spin against lubricated or co-poly strings will get extra rotation on the ball from the mains popping back in position before the ball leaves contact with the racket.
- Seed (or seeding): Player whose position in a tournament has been arranged based on their ranking so as not to meet other ranking players in the early rounds of play. Named for the similarity to scattering seeds widely over the ground to plant them. For a given tournament there is a specified number of seeds, depending on the size of the draw. For ATP tournaments, typically one out of four players are seeds. For example, a 32-draw ATP Tour 250 tournament would have eight seeds. The seeds are chosen and ranked by the tournament organizers and are selected because they are the players with the highest ranking who also, in the estimation of the organizers, have the best chance of winning the tournament. Seed ranking is sometimes controversial, because it does not always match the players' current ATP ranking.
- Serve and volley: Method of play to serve and immediately move forward to the net to make a volley with the intent to hit a winner and end the point.
- Serve-and-volleyer: Player that plays serves-and-volleys frequently or for all of their service points.
- Serve out: To win a set (and possibly therefore, the match) by holding serve.
- Serve (verb and noun. Also service, noun): The starting stroke of each point. The ball must be hit into the opponent's service box, specifically the box's half that is diagonally opposite the server.
- Servebot: Player who relies heavily on a powerful, consistent serve to win points quickly but contributes relatively little with their baseline or rallying game.
- Service box (or service court): Rectangular area of the court, marked by the sidelines and the service lines, that a serve is supposed to land in.
- Service game: With regard to a player, the game in which the player is serving (e.g. "Player A won a love service game" means that Player A has won a game where (s)he was serving without the opponent scoring).
- Service line: A line that runs parallel to the net at a distance of 21 ft (6.4m) and forms part of the demarcation of the service box.
- Set point: Situation in which the player who is leading needs one more point to win a set. If the player is serving in such a situation, (s)he is said to be "serving for the set".
- Set: A unit of scoring. A set consists of games and the first player to win six games with a two-game advantage wins the set. In most tournaments a tiebreak is used at six games all to decide the outcome of a set.
- Shallow: Not deep into the court; not close to the baseline (of a struck ball).
- Shamateurism: Amalgamation of 'sham' and 'amateurism', derogatory term for a custom that widely existed before the open era where an amateur player would receive financial remuneration to participate in a tournament in violation of amateur laws.
- Shank: Significantly misdirected shot, the result of hitting the ball in an unintentional manner, typically with the frame of the racket. Such shots typically land outside the court, however, it is possible to hit a shank that lands validly in the court.
- Shot clock: A publicly displayed clock which is used in between points to ensure that a player serves within 25 seconds. First used in Grand Slams at the Australian Open in 2018.
- Single-handed backhand (or single-hander): See one-handed backhand.
- Singles net: A net used for playing singles; shorter than a doubles net.
- Singles sticks (or net sticks): Pair of poles which are placed underneath the net near the singles sideline for the purpose of raising it for singles play.
- Singles: Match played by two players, one on each side of the court. A singles court is narrower than a doubles court and is bounded by the inner sidelines and the baseline.
- Sitter: Shot which is hit with very little pace and no spin, which bounces high after landing, thus being an easy shot to put away.
- Skyhook: Overhead shot hit behind the body.
- Sledgehammer: Colloquial term for a two-handed backhand winner down the line.
- Slice: Shot with underspin (backspin), or a serve with sidespin. Groundstrokes hit with slice tend to have a flat trajectory and a low bounce.
- Smash: Strongly hit overhead, typically executed when the player who hits the shot is very close to the net and can therefore hit the ball nearly vertically, often so that it bounces into the stands, making it unreturnable.
- Spank: To hit a groundstroke flat with much pace.
- Sparring partner: see hitting partner.
- Special exempt ("SE"): Players who are unable to appear in a tournament's qualifying draw because they are still competing in the final rounds of a previous tournament can be awarded a spot in the main draw by special exempt.
- Special ranking ("SR"): See protected ranking.
- Spin: Rotation of the ball as it moves through the air, affecting its trajectory and bounce. See backspin, topspin, and underspin.
- Split step: a footwork technique in which a player does a small bounce on both feet, just as the opponent hits the ball. This lets the player go more quickly in either direction.
- Spot serving/spot server: Serving with precision, resulting in the ball landing either on or near the intersection of the center service line and service line or singles tramline and service line.
- Squash shot: Forehand or backhand shot typically hit on the run from a defensive position, either with slice, or from behind the player's stance.
- Stance: The way a player stands when hitting the ball.
- Stick volley: Volley hit crisply, resulting in shot with a sharp downward trajectory.
- Stiffness (or racket stiffness): The resistance of the racket to bending upon impact with the ball.
- Stop volley: A softly-hit volley which absorbs almost all the power of the shot resulting in the ball dropping just over the net.
- Stopper: Player who will not win or go deep in a tournament but is good enough to stop a top seed from advancing.
- Straight sets: Situation in which the winner of a match does not lose a set. A straight set may also mean a set which is won by a score of 6-something; i.e. is won at the first opportunity and does not reach five games all.
- Stringbed: Grid of strings within the frame of the racket.
- String saver: Tiny piece of plastic that is sometimes inserted where the strings cross, to prevent the strings from abrading each other and prematurely breaking.
- Strings: Material woven through the face of the racket. The strings are where contact with the ball is supposed to be made.
- Stroke: Striking of the ball.
- Sudden death tiebreak: Version of a tiebreak played as the best of nine points, with the last being a deciding point to clinch the set. Introduced in 1965 by Jimmy Van Alen as a component of the VASSS.
- Super tiebreak (or Champions tiebreak): A tiebreak variation played with a first to ten points format instead of seven; usually used in doubles to decide a match instead of playing a third set.
- Supercoach: A tennis coach who has had a successful professional career.
- Sweetspot: Central area of the racket head which is the best location, in terms of control and power, for making contact with the ball.
- Swing volley: See drive volley.

== T ==
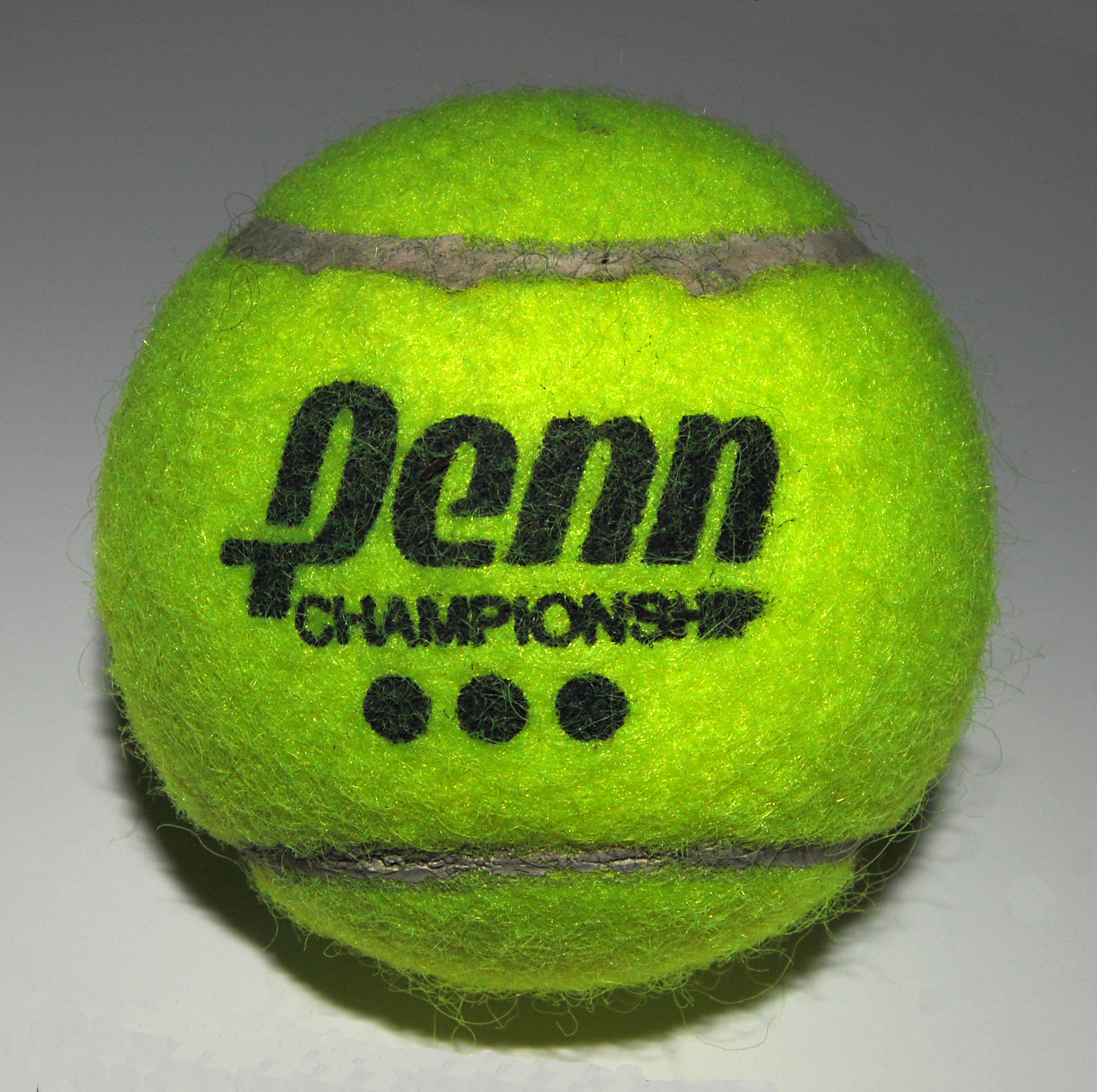
A standard optic yellow tennis ball

- Tanking (noun: tank): Colloquial term for losing a match on purpose; or to purposely lose a non-vital set, so as to focus energy and attention on a match-deciding set. It may result in a temporary ban such as that encountered by Nick Kyrgios at the 2016 and 2017 Shanghai Open.
- Tape it: To play a shot that hits the tape at the top of the net.
- Tennis ball: Soft, hollow, air-filled rubber ball coated in a synthetic fur, used in the game of tennis. The ITF specifies that a tennis ball must have a diameter of 6.54–6.86 cm (2.57–2.70 in) and a weight of 56.0–59.4g. Yellow and white are the only approved colors at tournament level.
- Tennis bubble: Indoor tennis facility consisting of a domed structure which is supported by air pressure generated by blowers inside the structure.
- Tennis dad: Father of a tennis player, often used in reference to a parent actively participating in the player's tennis development and/or career.
- Tennis elbow: Common injury in beginner to intermediate tennis players, possibly due to improper technique or a racket which transmits excessive vibration to the arm.
- Tennis Hall of Fame: The International Tennis Hall of Fame located in Newport, Rhode Island, United States. It was established in 1954 and hosts an annual tournament around the induction ceremony.
- The vineyard of tennis: Southern California as characterized by tennis commentator and historian Bud Collins.
- Tiebreak: Special game played when the score is 6–6 in a set to decide the winner of the set; the winner is the first to reach at least seven points with a difference of two points over the opponent.
- Tie: Synonymous with match, but used for team competitions such as the Davis Cup and Fed Cup.
- Topspin: Spin of a ball where the top of the ball rotates toward the direction of travel; the spin goes forward over the top of the ball, causing the ball to dip and bounce at a higher angle to the court.
- Toss: At the beginning of a match, the winner of a coin toss chooses who serves first. In amateur tennis the toss is often performed by spinning the racket.
- Touch: Occurs when a player touches any part of the net when the ball is still in play, losing the point.
- Tramline: Line defining the limit of play on the side of a singles or doubles court.
- Trampolining: Effect which occurs when striking a ball flat with a racket that is strung at a very loose tension. Trampolining results in a shot that has a very high velocity.
- Two ball pass: Passing an opponent that has come to the net with a first shot that causes them trouble on the volley followed up by hitting the second ball by them.
- Triple bagel: Colloquial term for three sets won to love. See bagel.
- Triple crown: Winning the championship in all three tennis disciplines (singles, doubles and mixed doubles) at one event, especially a Grand Slam tournament.
- T (the T): The spot on a tennis court where the center line and the service line intersect perpendicularly to form a "T" shape.
- Tube: (Colloquial term) to deliberately and successfully hit the ball at the opponent's body; e.g. "he tubed his opponent."
- Tweener (also called tweeny, tweenie, hot dog, Gran Willy or Sabatweenie — the last two being named after Guillermo Vilas and Gabriela Sabatini respectively, who pioneered the shot in the 1970s and 80s): A difficult trick shot in which a player hits the ball between their legs. It is usually performed when chasing down a lob with the player's back to the net. Forward-facing tweeners are also sometimes employed, and have been dubbed "front tweeners".
- Tweener racket: a tennis racket of mid-weight, mid-head size and mid-stiffness, often used as a transitional racket for young professionals.
- Twist serve (or American twist serve): Serve hit with a combination of slice and topspin which results in a curving trajectory and high bounce in the opposite direction of the ball's flight trajectory. See also kick serve.
- Two-handed backhand (or double-handed backhand, double-hander, two-hander): Backhand stroke hit with both hands on the grip.
- Two-handed forehand (or double-handed forehand, double-hander, two-hander): Forehand stroke hit with both hands on the grip.

== U ==
- Umpire (or chair umpire): Person designated to enforce the rules of the game during play, usually sitting on a high chair beside the net.
- Underhand serve (or underarm serve): A serve in which the player lobs the ball from below shoulder level.
- Underspin (or backspin or undercut): Spin of a ball where the top of the ball rotates away from the direction of travel; the spin is underneath the ball, causing the ball to float and to bounce at a lower angle to the court.
- Unforced error: Error in a service or return shot that cannot be attributed to any factor other than poor judgement and execution by the player; contrasted with a forced error.
- Unseeded player: Player who is not a seed in a tournament.
- Upset: The defeat of a high-ranked player by a lower-ranked player.

== V ==
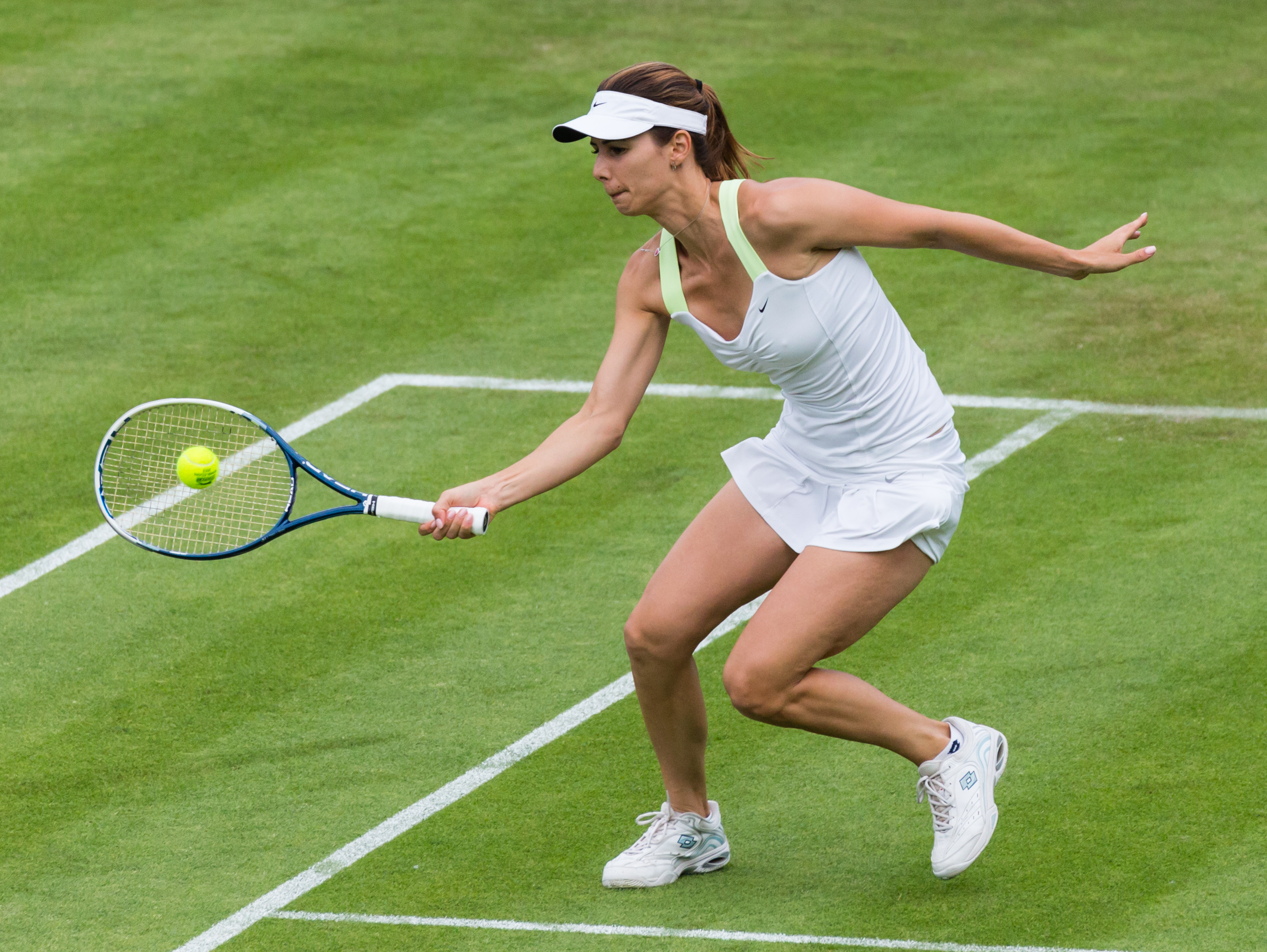
Approaching a forehand volley

- Vantage: Archaic term for advantage.
- VASSS: Abbreviation for Van Alen Streamlined Scoring System, an alternative scoring method developed by James Van Alen aimed at avoiding very long matches that can arise under the traditional advantage scoring system. The only element of the VASSS to be adopted by tennis authorities was the tiebreak.
- Volley: A shot hit, usually in the vicinity of the net, by a player before the ball bounces on their own side of the court.

== W ==
- Walkover ("WO" or "w/o"): Unopposed victory. A walkover is awarded when the opponent fails to start the match for any reason, such as injury. For a mid-match withdrawal, see retirement.
- Western grip: Type of grip used if a player wants to generate much topspin on the groundstrokes, is created by placing the index knuckle on bevel 5 of the grip.
- Whiff: A stroke in which the player misses the ball completely. Whiffing a serve is considered a fault in an official match.
- Wide: A call to indicate that the ball has landed out of court, beyond the sideline.
- Wild card ("WC"): Player allowed to play in a tournament, even if their rank is not adequate or they do not register in time. Typically a few places in the draw are reserved for wild cards, which may be for local players who do not gain direct acceptance or for players who are just outside the ranking required to gain direct acceptance. Wild cards may also be given to players whose ranking has dropped due to a long-term injury.
- Winner: A shot that is not reached by the opponent and wins the point; sometimes also a serve that is reached but not returned into the court.
- Wood shot: See frame shot.
- WCT: Abbreviation for World Championship Tennis, a tour for professional male tennis players established in 1968 which lasted until the emergence of the ATP Tour in 1990.
- Wrong-foot (or wrong foot, wrongfoot): To hit the ball in the opposite horizontal direction to that expected by the opponent, causing them to switch direction suddenly.
- WTA Finals: The annual season-ending tournament of the WTA Tour featuring the eight top-ranked women in the world (plus two alternates).
- WTA Tour: Worldwide top-tier tennis tour for women organized by the Women's Tennis Association.
- WTA: Abbreviation for Women's Tennis Association, the main organizing body of women's professional tennis; governs the WTA Tour with the largest tournaments for women.

== Y ==
- Yo-yo: Situation in which a player scores by hitting the ball in backspin in such a way that the ball touches the opponent's court first and returns to the player side after the first bounce.

== Z ==
- Zero pointer: Ranking points received by skipping selected professional tennis tour events which a top ranked player is committed to participate in (mandatory tournaments). Therefore, the player risks getting no points added to their ranking even when participating in an alternative tournament in place of the mandatory event.

== See also ==
- Tennis shots
