= Pusher (tennis) =

Tennis playing strategy

In tennis, a pusher is a defensive player who "pushes" back balls without deliberately hitting a winner. Pushers aim to hit deep strokes, dinks, and lobs, which are characterized by consistency. Backspin is typically used instead of topspin. This style of play, similar to a "human backboard", contrasts with offensive opponents who favor powerful shots. Pushers aim to elicit unforced errors from the opponent, i.e. by waiting for them to make the first mistake.

== Counter-strategies ==
Playing pushers, especially in the lower levels of competition, can be difficult for players unaccustomed to their style. However, there are several counter-strategies players use to defeat pushers.

=== Playing the net ===
Bringing pushers to the net is a good way to move them out of their comfort zones. Players use drop shots or chip and charge tactics to accomplish this. Volleying from the net can also be effective against pushers. Hitting the ball at the net cuts down on the time that the ball takes to reach other side, making it harder for the pushers to run down the ball. Even if they do reach it, chances are that their return shot will be an easy put-away. Varying the placements of volleys, so they do not become predictable, is also a good tactic.

=== Mental approach ===
Players should try to never let the pusher see them being frustrated. Pushers play with the mentality that, "It's a lot more frustrating to make a mistake than to have an opponent hit a brilliant shot that no one could have gotten." A pusher's mental game is key to his or her success, and an opponent who is obviously tired and angry will make the pusher more confident. Players should try to stay calm and focused to outlast and beat pushers.

=== Timed aggression ===
Employing timed aggression is another viable approach. Since pushers tend to hit few winners and lack proficient passing shots, opponents can bide their time, waiting for the opportune moment to launch an attack. Exhibiting aggression when faced with a second serve is particularly effective, as it may represent the only instance during the rally where the pusher hits a shorter ball. Given that many of the pusher's shots possess deep trajectory, backspin, or limited pace, opponents recognize the importance of swiftly moving towards the ball. The pusher seeks to exploit any laziness in shot approach, and reaching the ball early enables players to strike balls on the rise, generating additional pace and rendering the return more challenging.

=== Pushers' weaknesses ===
Hitting a moonball to a pusher's backhand side will often force them to hit a lob, allowing a relatively leisurely overhead to end the point. In some cases, players may be able to outlast the pusher by hitting several cross-court strokes and waiting for the pusher to hit a ball that can be volleyed away. If a player does not put a lot of topspin on their shots, their opponent may well try to control the center court. This forces the pusher to go for deeper and more angled shots, which are harder to hit without topspin.

== See also ==
- Tennis strategy
