= Serve-and-volley =

Tennis play style

Serve-and-volley is a style of play in tennis where the serving player moves quickly towards the net after hitting a serve, to attempt to hit a volley afterwards. In the serve-and-volley playstyle, the server attempts to hit a volley (a shot where the ball is struck without allowing it to bounce), as opposed to the baseline game, where the server stays back following the serve and attempts to hit a groundstroke (a shot where the ball is allowed to bounce before contact is made). As a returner (receiver, volleyer) of a serve, the player may also attempt to hit a half-volley, instead of waiting longer after the ball has bounced to hit a usual groundstroke (e.g. Roger Federer's SABR).

The aim of this strategy is to put immediate pressure on the opponent with the intent of ending points quickly. This tactic is especially useful on fast tennis courts (e.g. grass courts) and less so on slow courts (e.g. clay courts). For it to be successful, the player needs to be quick and confident in their movement around the net to produce an effective returning volley with less time to react than a baseline game, with the reward of the opponent also having less time to react to their volley. As with any style, a good serve is important as well. Ken Rosewall, for instance, had a mediocre serve but was a successful serve-and-volley player off his volley skills for two decades. Goran Ivanišević, on the other hand, also had success employing the serve-and-volley strategy with great serves and average volleys.

The serve-and-volley style of play was common at the highest level of the sport in the 20th century. It diminished in the 21st century, and is seen far less frequently. Advances in racquet and string technologies allow players to generate a great amount of top spin on groundstrokes and passing shots, making them much more competitive with volleys. It is generally thought that contemporary players with 21st century equipment playing on 1970s courts would produce a string of aces; in response, court surfaces have become slower and balls have been deflated, promoting longer rallies. This, however, had the side effect of devaluing the serve-and-volley style.

== The serve-and-volley era (1940s–2000) ==
Maurice McLoughlin, in the early years of the 20th century, "created the cannonball (serve) delivery" and often followed his serve into the net. Although tennis greats such as Bill Tilden, Ellsworth Vines, and Don Budge were noted for their fine serves and net games, they did not play a 100% serve-and-volley style game. Jack Kramer in the late 1940s was the first great player to consistently come to the net after every serve, including his second serve. Kramer writes, however, in his 1979 autobiography, that it was Bobby Riggs, his opponent in the 1948 Pro tennis tour who began the strategy: "When we first started touring he came at me on his first serve, on his second serve, and on my second serve.... my second serve didn't kick like Bobby's, so he could return that deep enough and follow into the net.... It forced me to think attack constantly. I would rush in and try to pound his weakest point -- his backhand. So the style I am famous for was not consciously planned: it was created out of the necessity of dealing with Bobby Riggs." The playing style quickly gained popularity among elites and remained dominant on certain court surfaces until the conclusion of the twentieth century.

In the mid-1950s, when Pancho Gonzales was dominating professional tennis with his serve-and-volley game, occasional brief attempts were made to partially negate the power of his serve. This, it was felt, would lead to longer rallies and more spectator interest. At least three times the rules were modified:

- In several important tournaments such as the United States Professional Championships the Van Alen Streamlined Scoring System (VASSS), devised by James Van Alen, was used. The match was scored as if in table tennis, with 21 points per game, 5 serves per player, and no second serves. The fans preferred the traditional scoring system, however, and in any case Gonzales continued to win under VASSS rules.
- Jack Kramer, by then the professional tour promoter and no longer its dominant player, also tried a three-bounce rule, in which the server could not come to the net until the ball had been in play for at least three bounces. Gonzales won anyway, and this experiment was dropped.
- Kramer also tried marking a secondary service line one yard behind the baseline, so that the server was further away from the net when he served. Once again Gonzales was undeterred and the original rules were restored.

Other male tennis players known for their serve-and-volley technique include Frank Sedgman, Ken Rosewall, Lew Hoad, Rod Laver, Roy Emerson, John Newcombe, John McEnroe, Stefan Edberg, Pat Cash, Boris Becker, Patrick Rafter, Pete Sampras and Tim Henman. Sampras, despite being known for his great serve and volley game, did not always come to the net behind the serve on slower courts, particularly on the second serve. This was especially the case when he was younger.

The serve-and-volley strategy has traditionally been less common amongst female players. An early pioneer in women's volleying was Elizabeth Ryan, who was at the top of the women's game in the mid-to-late 1920s. But it was later on that serve and volley caught on in women's game. The style propelled Margaret Court to become the all-time leader in Grand Slam titles (24 in singles, 62 total). Martina Navratilova and Jana Novotná later became players well known for their serve-and-volley style. More recently, players such as Martina Hingis, Justine Henin, and Amélie Mauresmo were willing to come to the net, with Henin and Mauresmo playing a very heavy serve and volley style and volleying in general match during the 2006 Wimbledon Finals. Later in her career Henin was also known for serving and volleying on set and match points, such as on Championship point at the 2007 US Open Final against Svetlana Kuznetsova.

== Serve-and-volley in the twenty-first century ==
Although the strategy has become less common in both the men's and women's game, a few players still preferred to approach the net on their serves in the twenty-first century, for example Nicolas Mahut, Rajeev Ram, Dustin Brown, Pierre-Hugues Herbert, and Maxime Cressy. Roger Federer serve-volleyed at times during his career, particularly on grass.

Other players, despite not being pure serve-and-volleyers, do employ serve-and-volley as a surprise tactic. Examples include Carlos Alcaraz, Rafael Nadal, and Daniil Medvedev.

The removal of grass surfaces from major tournaments and the change in 2001 of Wimbledon's grass to encourage higher bounces have reduced the efficacy of this playing style.

== Views ==
Bill Tilden, the dominant player of the 1920s and one of the fathers of the cannonball serve, nevertheless preferred to play from the backcourt and liked nothing better than to face an opponent who threw powerful serves and groundstrokes at him and who rushed the net — one way or another Tilden would find a way to hit the ball past him. Tilden spent a great amount of time analyzing the game of tennis. His book Match Play and the Spin of the Ball (1925) is still in print. In it, Tilden states that a perfect baseline player will always beat a perfect serve-and-volleyer 6–0 because his returns of service will be winning passing shots; however he also states that of course neither such a player can exist. Tilden used this style of play for many years.

According to Pat Cash, some notable matches have featured contests between leading baseliners such as Björn Borg, Mats Wilander, and Andre Agassi, and prominent serve-and-volleyers such as John McEnroe, Pat Rafter or Pete Sampras. Since Tilden's era, head-to-head results on various playing surfaces, including the rivalry between Borg and McEnroe, have been cited to contradict his view that great baseline players generally hold an advantage over serve-and-volley ones.

Another perspective on the serve-and-volley game is that it is less tiring than playing constantly from the backcourt. Kramer says in his autobiography that he and Pancho Segura once tried playing three matches in which they allowed the ball to bounce three times before either could approach the net. "I don't believe I could have played tennis the way Segoo and I did for the three nights because it wore me out, running down all those groundstrokes. It was much more gruelling than putting a lot into a serve and following it in." He went to say that "Rosewall was a backcourt player when he came into the pros, but he learned very quickly how to play the net. Eventually, for that matter, he became a master of it, as much out of physical preservation as for any other reason. I guarantee you that Kenny wouldn't have lasted into his forties as a world-class player if he hadn't learned to serve and volley."

Despite the improvements in racquet technology made towards the end of the twentieth century which made serve-and-volley a rarer tool in a tennis player's skill set, players familiar with the strategy still advocate it. Roger Federer advocated up-and-coming players not to ignore the tactic's strategy of coming to the net, especially on faster surfaces and as a surprise tactic. Yet other players, such as Mischa Zverev, acknowledged the difficulty of mastering serve-and-volley, recalling his 36-month effort to adopt the style. He said: "Every point, you have to be ready. You're either going to get passed, you're going to miss an easy volley or you're going to win the point," and likened it to the stochastic nature of flipping a coin.

== See also ==
- Glossary of tennis terms
- Tennis shots
