= Rally (tennis) =

A rally in tennis is a collective name given to a sequence of back and forth shots between players, within a point. A rally starts with the serve and the return of the serve, followed by continuous return shots until a point is scored which ends the rally.

== See also ==
- Glossary of tennis terms
- Tennis shots
- Groundstroke
