= Drop shot =

Shot in racquet sports

A drop shot is a shot in some racket sports in which the ball (or birdie) is hit relatively softly, sometimes with topspin or backspin, so that it lands just over and close to the net. A well-placed and well-timed drop shot will make it difficult for the opposing player to hit an aggressive or offensive shot in return. The most successful drop shots will not allow the opponent to hit the ball back at all.

== Tennis ==
A good drop shot requires great touch. The ball should bounce low and near the net, sometimes with underspin (or backspin). Backspin slows the ball and decreases the height of its bounce. In some extreme cases, the ball will bounce back towards the net. Sidespin may also be put on the ball so it kicks sideways when it bounces. A bad drop shot is one that travels too deep into the court, or bounces too high. When this happens, the opponent can get to the ball, and make an easy play. A very soft drop shot, that just barely travels over the net, is sometimes called a dink (a term possibly borrowed from volleyball).

Making the drop shot a surprise also makes it more effective. If opponents are expecting a normal shot, they may not be in position to run forward to make a good play on a drop shot.

The characteristics of some court surfaces make drop shots particularly effective; grass and clay are good examples. On grass, the ball tends to bounce lower than other courts, which makes it harder to retrieve a drop shot. On clay, the slow surface tends to encourage players to stay far back and engage in rallies from behind the baseline, which in turn increases the distance the player must cover to reach a drop shot near the net. Drop shots on hard courts can be useful, although to a lesser degree. Drop shots are also useful when the wind is blowing in the opposite direction of the shot; this allows spin without hitting the shot too long.

A drop shot hit with a volley is aptly coined a drop volley. The secret to making a good drop volley is having "soft hands." To achieve this, a player slightly loosens his or her grip on the racquet at the moment of impact with the ball. This allows the racquet to absorb more force and reduces the ball's rebound. This stroke was mastered by one of the greatest serve and volleyers of all time, John McEnroe.

== Pickleball ==
In the sport of pickleball a drop shot is a soft shot with a high arc, made from the back of the court after the ball has bounced, that lands the ball in, or near, the opponent's non-volley zone, also called the kitchen. A drop volley is substantially the same shot, but made before the ball bounces. A dink shot is similar to a drop shot, but a dink is hit even softer and performed when the player is at or near the non-volley line, or, if the ball has bounced, possibly standing in the player's own non-volley zone. A dink shot hit before the ball bounces is called a dink volley.

Drop shots, drop volleys, dinks, and dink volleys are particularly effective in the sport of pickleball because a player can never volley the ball, hit the ball before the ball bounces, if they are in contact with their side's non-volley zone, an area that extends 7 feet (2.1 m) feet from the net. If a player does volley the ball while in contact with their non-volley zone, that player incurs a fault, and their opponent wins the point. Additionally, balls used in the sport are made of a hard plastic that limits the ball's bounce, when compared to balls in other sports such as a tennis ball. When drop shots and dink shots are done correctly, it is difficult for the opponent to attack the ball, forcing the opponent to hit a soft upward shot in return. Drop shots are commonly used by the serving team on the third shot of the game, called the third shot drop, because it can give the serving team time to approach the net, a strategically important position on the court.

== See also ==
- Glossary of tennis terms
- Tennis shots
