= 10 and Under Tennis =

10 and Under Tennis is a program that was introduced by the United States Tennis Association (USTA) in the summer of 2010. Upon making the change official in 2012, it modified the format of all USTA and International Tennis Federation (ITF) events involving players of years 10 and younger. The program changes the game making it easier for children to succeed. The objective is to adapt the court, balls, racket, and net to the size and strength level of youth players. These alternations create the opportunity for younger players to spend more time hitting balls rather than chasing them. It allows them to hone tennis skills and accelerate their development. The hope is that earlier success in tennis will translate to a lifetime of interest in the sport and perhaps set a foundation for generations of more world-class players.

Under the changes made through 10 and Under Tennis, not only are court dimensions smaller, racket shorter, and tennis nets lower but the balls used are larger and have less compression. With a lower compression, balls don't bounce as high. This keeps them within a younger players strike zone creating more chances to make contact with the ball.

The unique coloring of the balls provides better visual indication of the spin that both that the player and his/her opponent are able to put on the ball. A large part of developing a strong tennis stroke is being able to generate the necessary ball rotation required in each situation. The colorized ball provides immediate feedback, letting the young players know if they executed their stroke properly.

As young players progress in age and ability, the size of the court and balls change as well. The player's progression through the levels of the 10 and Under Tennis program supports an easier transition to the standard adult game. By the time players evolve to the traditional ball and court dimensions, they will have had more chances to master the nuances of the game than players taking more conventional developmental approaches using standard balls, court sizes, and instruction.

== Red Stage 1 (ages 4-6) ==
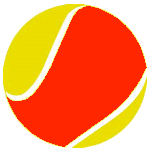
Red Ball

Red stage 1 is for ages four to six.

Ball:

- Color: Red & Yellow
- Material: Foam
- Size: larger than felt red ball
- Compression: n/a

Racket:

- Size: 23 inches or less

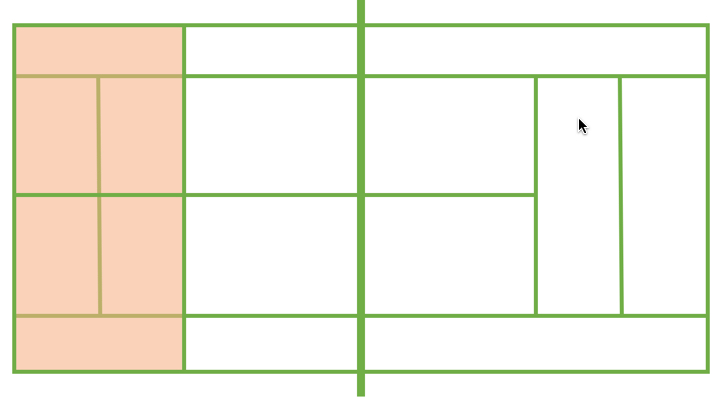
Red Court

Court:

- Singles Dimensions: 36 feet by 18 feet
- Doubles Dimension: n/a

Net:

- Height: 2 feet 9 inches

Scoring:

- Best of 3 games. 7 points per game. First to 7 wins the game.
- 1 set to 6 games (lead by 2) with a 9-point tie-break at 6–6. Every game starts at 30-30 (https://thirty30tennis.com)

Goals:

- Developing basic athletic skills as well as eye / hand coordination.

== Red Stage 2 (ages 6-8) ==
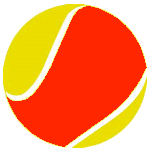
Red Ball

Red stage 2 is for ages six to eight.

Ball:

- Color: Red & Yellow
- Material: Felt
- Size: 15% larger than standard yellow balls
- Compression: 25% compression of yellow balls

Racket:

- Size: 23 inches or less

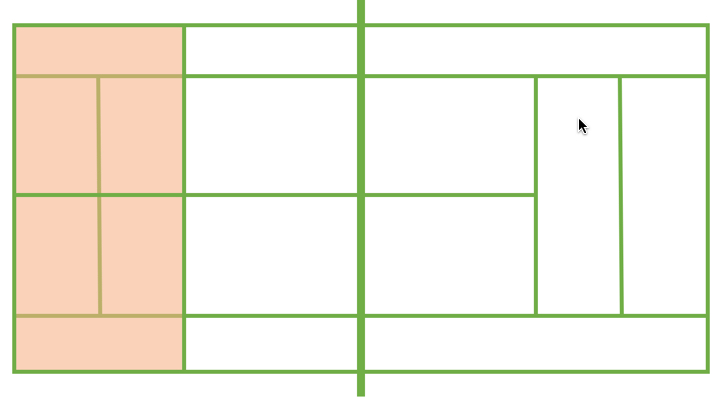
Red Court

Court:

- Singles Dimensions: 36 feet by 18 feet
- Doubles Dimension: n/a

Net:

- Height: 2 feet 9 inches

Scoring:

- Best of 3 games. 7 points per game. First to 7 wins the game.
- 1 set to 6 games (lead by 2) with a 9-point tie-break at 6–6. Every game starts at 30-30 (https://thirty30tennis.com)

Goals:

- Developing basic athletic, racquet, and tennis game skills.

== Orange (ages 7-10) ==
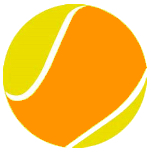
Orange Ball

Orange stage is for ages seven to ten.

Ball:

- Color: Orange & Yellow
- Material: Felt
- Size: standard size
- Compression: 50% compression of yellow balls

Racket:

- Size: 23-25 inches

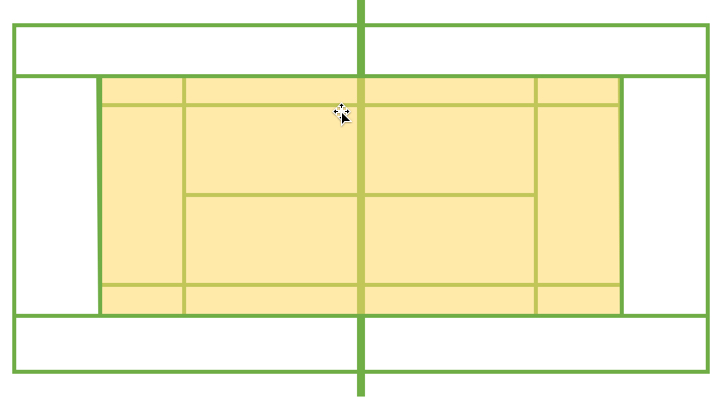
Orange Court

Court:

- Singles Dimensions: 60 feet by 21 feet
- Doubles Dimension: 60 feet by 27 feet

Net:

- Height: 3 feet at center, 3 feet 6 inches at posts

Scoring:

- Best of 3 sets. The first to win 4 games wins the set. In the third set, the first player to win 7 points wins the set.
- 1 set to 6 games (lead by 2) with a 9-point tie-break at 6–6. Every game starts at 30-30 (https://thirty30tennis.com)

Goals:

- Developing tennis athletic, technical, and competitive skills.

== Green (ages 11-12) ==
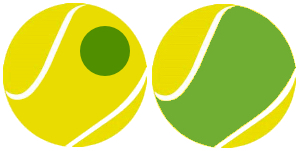
Green Ball Variations

Green stage is for ages eleven to twelve.

Ball:

- Color: Green & Yellow
- Material: Felt
- Size: standard size
- Compression: 75% compression of yellow balls

Racket:

- Size: 25-27 inches

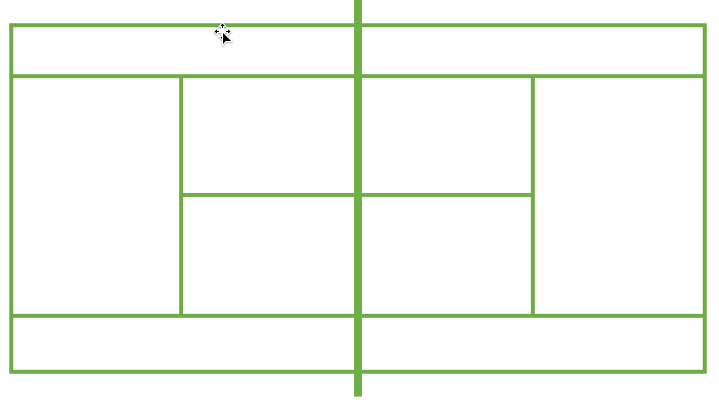
Green Court

Court:

- Singles Dimensions: 78 feet by 27 feet
- Doubles Dimension: 78 feet by 36 feet

Net:

- Height: 3 feet at center, 3 feet 6 inches at posts

Scoring:

- Best of 3 games. 7 points per game, first to 7 wins the game.
- 1 set to 6 games (lead by 2) with a 9-point tie-break at 6–6. Every game starts at 30-30 (https://thirty30tennis.com)

Goals:

- Bring together tennis technical, tactical, and physical skills during competition.
