= Passing shot =

Tennis or handball shot

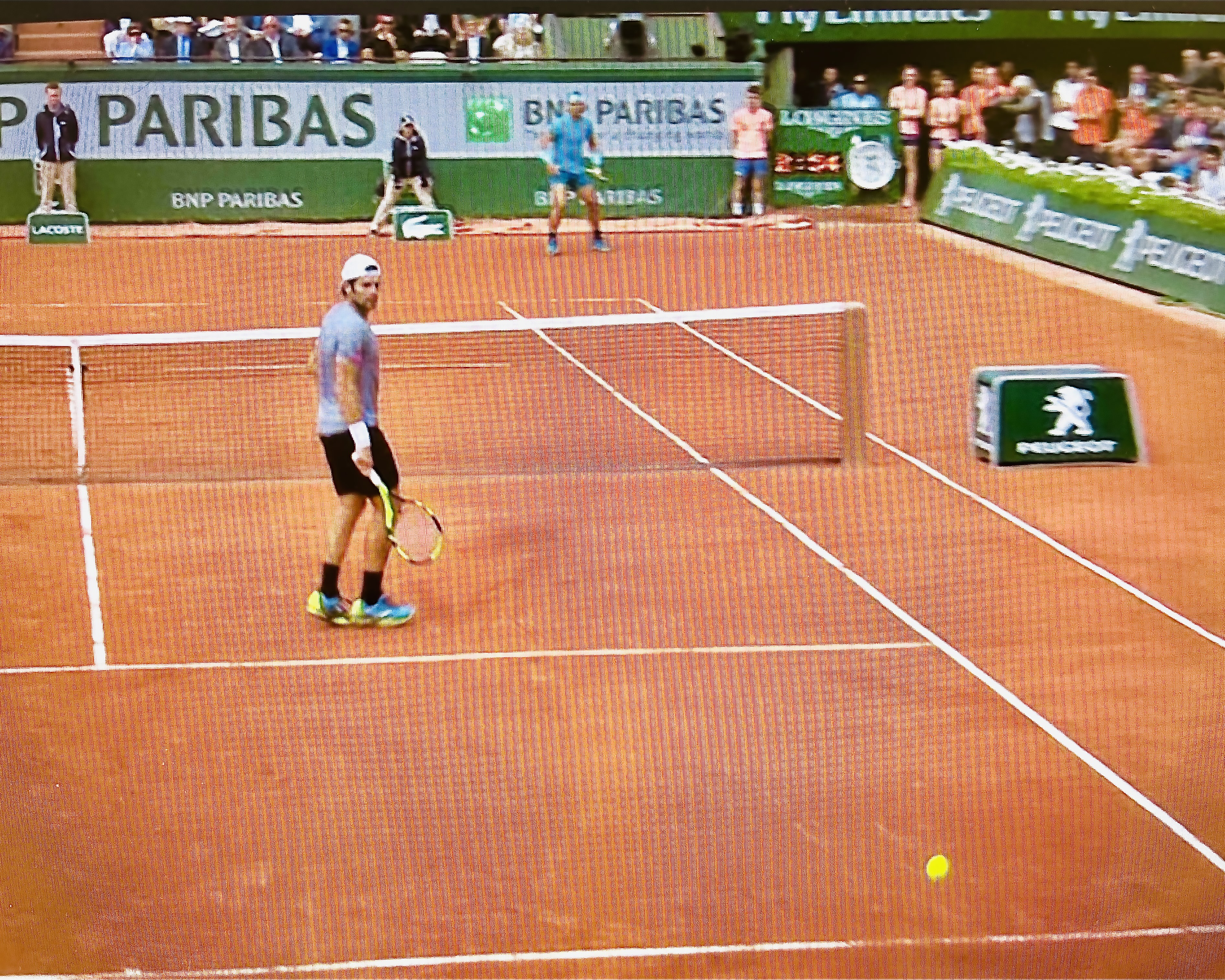
Rafael Nadal (far court) hits a successful passing shot down the line to win a point against Simone Bolelli (near court) during the 2018 French Open. Bolelli, at net, watches the ball pass him.

A passing shot is a forceful shot, as in tennis or team handball, that travels to one side out of the reach of one's opponent. In tennis, this shot is generally a groundstroke and is used when one's opponent is running to the net or if they are at the net already. The alternative to a passing shot is to lob the ball over the opponent's head. The aim of the passing shot in tennis is to prevent the opponent from returning the ball once he/she is at the net.

== Strategy ==
In tennis, there are 3 main ways to execute an effective passing shot: hitting a fast return, hitting an angled ball, and bluffing.

Fast return: The fast return is probably the most simple and common form of passing shot. Because the opponent has a shorter reaction time when they are at the net as compared to the baseline, a fast return can catch them off-guard or render them unable to react quickly enough. A fast return is usually played with great power as angled as possible either cross-court or down-the-line. To be able to hit such a shot, a player must have either a very strong and flat forehand or backhand, and not all players are able to execute such a passing shot well. Players who are adept at using pace to execute passing shots include Andre Agassi, Novak Djokovic and Serena Williams.

Angled shot: As compared to the fast return that uses speed to catch the opponent off-guard, angled shots are meant to be more subtle but are harder to pull off. However, if executed correctly, it is probably the most efficient way of hitting a passing shot. It involves hitting the ball at as acute an angle as possible, usually cross-court such that the ball falls right in front of the net, but bounces towards the side, making it impossible for the opponent to return the ball. To hit at such an angle, a lot of top-spin on the ball is usually required as well as a soft touch. Thus, players who can execute angled shots well are usually players who are familiar with using a lot of top-spin in their play, such as Rafael Nadal, Novak Djokovic and Roger Federer, who is famous for hitting half volley angled passing shots. Chris Evert is usually considered to have had one of the best directed passing shots in the history of the game, hitting her shots with pinpoint precision against serve and volley players.

Bluffing: Bluffing is probably the hardest way to execute a passing shot and requires a good touch as well as the ability to "confuse" the opponent well. When at the net, the opponent often takes note of the direction the other player is looking at, in order to guess which direction he/she will be hitting and anticipate in advance. This can be exploited by bluffing. Bluffing involves looking in one direction in order to make the opponent think the shot will be played in that direction, then while keeping the rest of the body angled towards that direction, the ball is hit gently towards the other direction, effectively passing the opponent. However, this makes it hard to execute as one will have to hit the ball without looking in the direction one wants to hit it in, making it hard to aim accurately. This is the rarest way of executing a passing shot, and has only been seen used occasionally by players such as Roger Federer.

Some of notable tennis players skilled in passing shots are:

- Chris Evert
- Martina Navratilova
- Steffi Graf
- Monica Seles
- Serena Williams
- Maria Sharapova
- Justine Henin
- Martina Hingis
- Simona Halep
- Caroline Wozniacki
- Angelique Kerber
- Novak Djokovic
- Jimmy Connors
- Miloslav Mečíř
- Roger Federer
- Rafael Nadal
- Andy Murray
- Marcelo Ríos
- Andre Agassi
- Björn Borg
- Ivan Lendl
- Gaël Monfils
- Stanislas Wawrinka
- Pete Sampras
