= Tennis shot =

Way of hitting the ball in tennis

In tennis, there are a variety of types of shots (ways of hitting the ball) which can be categorized in various ways. The serve is the opening shot of a point, and it's typically struck using an overhead throwing motion. Shots struck during the point are categorized into two major categories: groundstrokes, which are hit after the ball has bounced, and volleys, which are hit out of the air. Both groundstrokes and volleys can be further classified as either forehands or backhands, with the classification determined by the side of the body on which the ball is hit.

Certain kinds of groundstrokes and volleys have specific names, so that tennis players can better communicate about the points they play. A lob is a groundstroke hit very high in the air, typically with the intention of hitting over the head of an opponent who is positioned at the net. A passing shot is a groundstroke that is driven past an opponent at net. A smash (also referred to as an "overhead") is an overhead swing used to hit high, floating balls with high velocity. It utilizes a similar motion to the serve. A drop shot is a slow moving shot, typically played with backspin, that is intentionally hit short, in hopes the ball will double bounce before the striker's opponent can retrieve it.

Shots are often further classified by their direction. A cross-court shot is a shot hit from the left (or right) side of one player's court to the left (or right) side of the other player's court (from each player's own point of view), so that it crosses the lengthwise centerline of the court. A down-the-line shot is one that is hit more or less parallel to, and near to, one of the sidelines, so that it never crosses the centerline.

Shots hit during a point without the ball having bounced are called volleys, while shots hit just a split second after the ball bounces are called half volleys.

A slice is a groundstroke or volley hit with backspin, while a topspin shot is a groundstroke or occasionally a volley hit with topspin.

Thus tennis shots can be categorized according to when they are hit (serve, groundstroke, volley, half volley), how they are hit (smash, forehand, backhand, flat, side spin, block, slice, topspin shot), or where they are hit (lob, passing shot, dropshot, cross-court shot, down-the-line shot).

All shots that pass either over or around the net and land anywhere within the confines of the court, lines included (except for serves, which need to land inside the designated service box), are considered good. Shots that touch the net and then land in their designated area are also considered good, with the exception of serves. Serves that fall into the service box after touching the net are called service lets, and the server simply serves again, without any impact on the scoring.

== Serve ==
A serve (or, more formally, a service) in tennis is a shot to begin the point. The most common serve used is an overhead serve. It is initiated by tossing the ball into the air over the server's head and hitting it when the arm is fully stretched out (usually near the apex of its trajectory) into the diagonally opposite service box without touching the net. The server may employ different types of serve: a flat, a top-spin, an American twist (or kick), or a slice serve. A severely sliced serve is sometimes called a sidespin. Some servers are content to use the serve simply to initiate the point; advanced players often try to hit a winning shot with their serve. A winning serve that is not touched by the opponent is called an ace.

== Forehand ==
The forehand is struck from the dominant side of the body by swinging the racquet in the direction of where the player wants to place the shot. It is called a forehand because the racquet is held in such a way that if one were to strike the ball without the racquet, it would hit the palm of your hand. This is the opposite side from a backhand. It is considered the easiest shot to master, perhaps because it is the most natural stroke. Beginners and advanced players often have better forehands than any other shots and use it as a weapon.

There are various grips for executing the forehand and their popularity has fluctuated over the years. The most important ones are the Continental, the Eastern, and the Western. The key differences between grips are the different angles they create between the angle of your palm and the angle of your racquet face. You are used to sensing the direction your palm is facing, so your palm makes the most intuitive basis for sensing the direction your racquet is facing. For a number of years the small, apparently frail 1920s player Bill Johnston was considered by many to have had the best forehand of all time, a stroke that he hit shoulder-high using a western grip. Few top players used the western grip after the 1920s, but in the latter part of the 20th century, as shot-making techniques and equipment changed radically, the western forehand made a strong comeback and is now used by many modern players. No matter which grip is used, most forehands are generally executed with one hand holding the racquet, but there have been fine players with two-handed forehands. In the 1940s and 50s the Ecuadorian/American player Pancho Segura used a two-handed forehand to devastating effect against larger, more powerful players, and many female and young players use the two-handed stroke today.

== Backhand ==
The backhand is struck from the non-dominant side of the body by bringing the racquet across the body (showing the back of your hand to the opponent) and swinging the racquet away from one's body in the direction of where the player wants the ball to go. It is generally considered more difficult to master than the forehand. It can be executed with either one or both hands. For most of the 20th Century it was performed with one hand, using either an eastern or a continental grip. The first notable players to use two hands were the 1930s Australians Vivian McGrath and John Bromwich. The two-handed backhand was used more often since it allowed easy access to power and control. Players such as Venus Williams, Serena Williams, Maria Sharapova, and Andre Agassi have used this stroke to its highest potential to win many grandslams. Two hands give the player more power so it provides the player with an advantage on power-focused shots. However, one hand is useful in that it can generate a slice shot, applying backspin on the ball to produce a low trajectory bounce. The player long considered to have had the best backhand of all time, Don Budge, had a very powerful one-handed stroke in the 1930s and '40s that imparted topspin onto the ball. Ken Rosewall, another player noted for his one-handed backhand, used a deadly accurate slice backhand with underspin through the 1950s and '60s. A small number of players, notably Monica Seles, use two hands on both the backhand and forehand sides.

== Volley ==
A volley is made in the air before the ball bounces, generally near the net or inside of the service line. Volleys consist of the forehand volley and backhand volley and are usually made with a stiff-wristed "punching" motion to hit the ball into an open area of the opponent's court. The half volley is made by hitting the ball on the rise just after it has bounced, once again generally in the vicinity of the net. From a poor defensive position on the baseline, the lob can be used as either an offensive or defensive weapon, hitting the ball high and deep into the opponent's court to either enable the lobber (the player hitting the lob) to get into better defensive position or to win the point outright by hitting it over the opponent's head. If the lob is not hit deeply enough into the other court, however, the opponent may then hit an overhead smash, a hard, serve-like shot (hit over the player's head), to end the point. Finally, if an opponent is deep in his court, a player may suddenly employ an unexpected drop shot, softly tapping the ball just over the net so that the opponent is unable to run in fast enough to retrieve it.

== Other shots ==
The "tweener" is a rarely used shot in which a player hits the ball between his/her legs, generally with their back facing the net. Also known as the between-the-legs shot or the Gran Willy (after Guillermo Vilas, an early pioneer), it is generally performed when the player must run to recover a lob and has no time to turn back to face the net before attempting their return. The shot was pioneered in the 1970s by Guillermo Vilas and Yannick Noah, both of whom claimed to have invented it; later players to use it include Ilie Năstase, Boris Becker, Gabriela Sabatini (whose version was called the "Sabatwini"), Andre Agassi, Roger Federer, Rafael Nadal, Novak Djokovic and Nicholas Kyrgios who helped popularize the shot. Forward-facing between-the-legs shots are also occasionally employed; they are sometimes called "front tweeners".

The "Bucharest Backfire" is an over-the-shoulder backward shot, generally used to recover lobs. Tennis writer Bud Collins named it in honor of Romanian player Ilie Năstase, who popularized it. Another seldom used shot is a behind-the-back shot, which, as its name suggests, is hit by crossing the preferred arm across his/her back without swinging. It is generally hit while stationary, and can occasionally be used as a volley shot. It is challenging to master as it is hard to predict where the ball may strike the racket, if not at all in most cases. Accurately hitting the ball to the desired location is also extremely hard to do.

The "Bowl Smash", also known as the "Skyhook Smash", or the "Skyhook", is a variation of the "Bucharest Backfire", showcased by Jimmy Connors. It consists on hitting a "Bucharest Backfire" while jumping, in order to recover lobs earlier, given the additional vertical reach provided by the jump. The player performing that shot may end up doing a full 360° spin in the process. Roger Federer and more frequently Rafael Nadal are known for performing this shot, even during official matches for the latter.

== See also ==
- Glossary of tennis terms
- Cricket shots
