= Volley (tennis) =

Shot in tennis

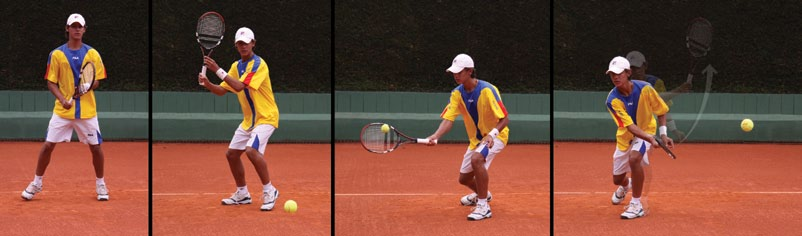
Motion of hitting a volley

A volley in tennis is a shot where the ball is struck before it bounces on the ground. Typically, a player hits a volley while standing near the net, though it can be executed further back, in the middle of the tennis court, or even near the baseline. The word derives from M. French volée meaning flight.

The primary objective of the volley is to go on the offensive and cut the amount of time for the opponent to react. Another advantage is that a player eliminates any possibility of a bad bounce from an uneven surface, such as on some grass and clay courts. Also, if near the net, a volleyer has a wider choice of angles to hit into the opponent's court. However, quick reflexes and hand–eye coordination are required to execute this shot. The primary means of countering a volley are the passing shot and the lob.

Generally, a player who advances to the net in the serve-and-volley-style game will make the initial volley fairly near the service line. The player will then move closer to the net in hopes of making a put-away volley for a winning point. It is difficult to hit an effective volley in the area between the baseline and the service line, and consequently this is often called "no man's land".

== Hitting a volley and variants ==
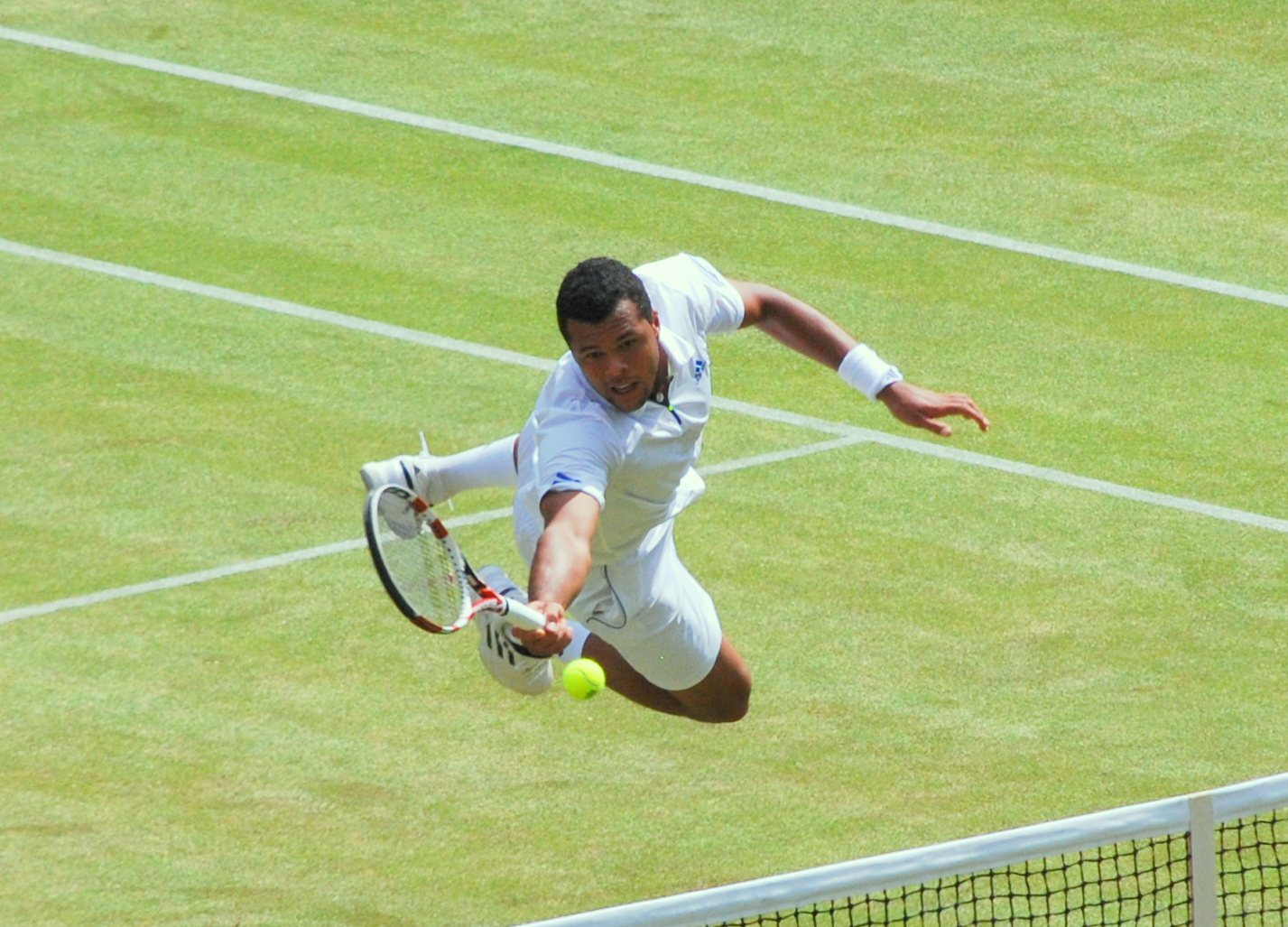
Jo-Wilfried Tsonga seen in 2011 doing a jump volley

It is important to not swing at the ball when volleying.

A regular volley is hit with a short backswing and a punching stroke. While standing at the net, a player usually has no time to take a long backswing. When the ball comes at less pace, though, the volleyer can take a longer backswing to impart more force on the ball, which is called a swing volley. A player can also touch the ball lightly, so that the ball will fall just beyond the net. This is known as a drop volley.

Another type of volley is the drive volley, in which the ball is hit in the air with an open racquet face and given topspin or backspin. It is popular in women's tennis. This is hit with full backswing and follow through. Effectively this is a volley equivalent of a groundstroke and a very aggressive shot, giving the opponent less time, and can be used as a way to approach the net (approach shot).

To be effective and safe, a volley should be either (1) a drop volley that barely passes the net, so the opposing player will not be able to get to it, or (2) a very sharply angled shot so that again the opponent will not be able to get to it, or (3) a hard shot that bounces very near both the opponent's baseline and the sideline and serves as a set-up shot in anticipation of a weak return by the opponent. Any other volley will permit the opponent to get to the ball in plenty of time to make an aggressive return shot, either a lob or a passing shot.

== Half volley ==
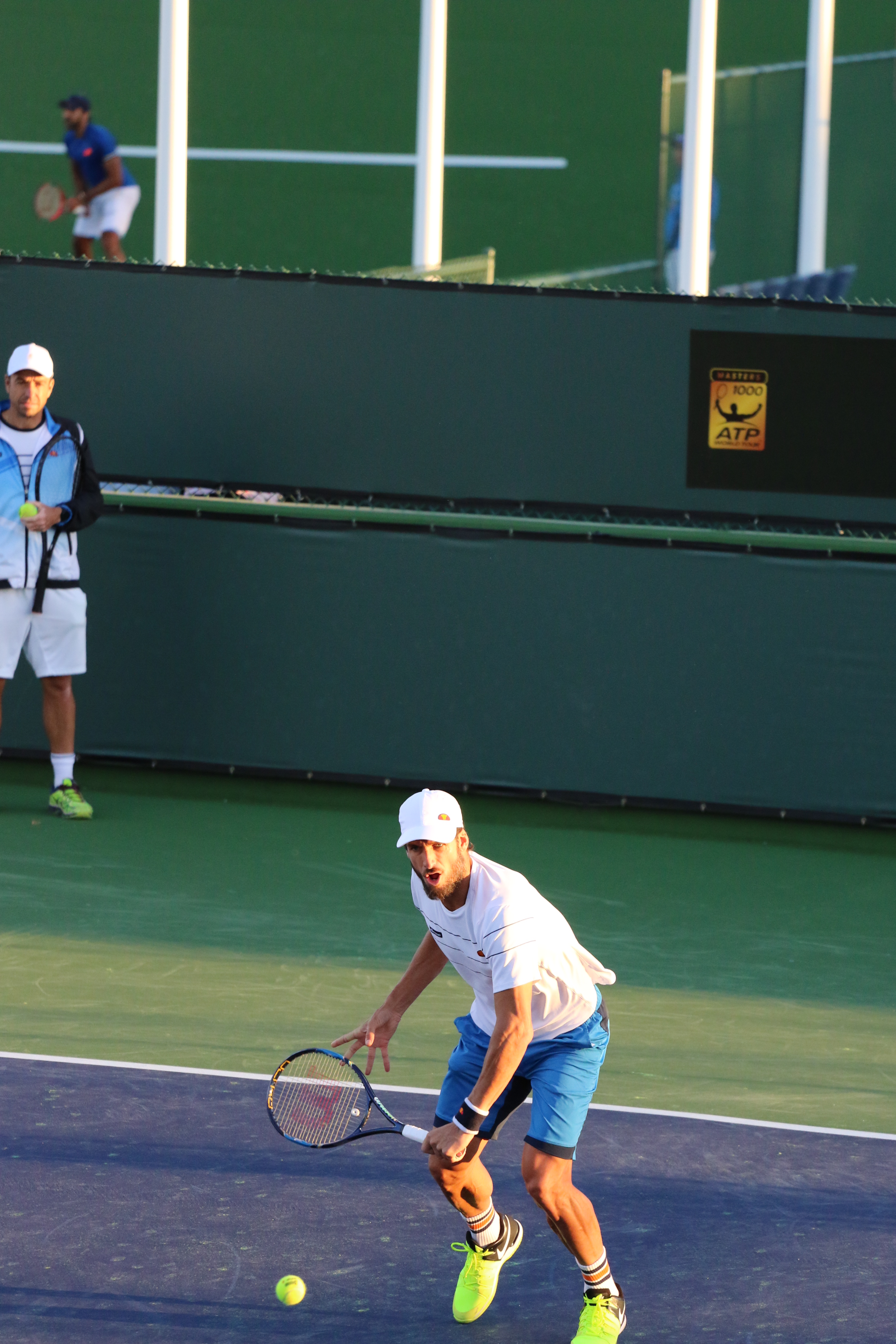
A half-volley hit during the 2017 BNP Paribas Open

This tennis shot is called a half volley if it is hit immediately after bouncing, while it is still on the ascent. The racquet contacts the ball almost at surface level. The lower the ball comes at the volleyer, the more difficult this shot becomes, as it requires both adaptive thinking and quick reflexes. In such cases, it can be more advantageous to let the ball bounce and immediately hit the return on the rise rather than attempt to volley it. Some notable half volley experts included players such as: John McEnroe, Patrick Rafter, and Leander Paes.

== See also ==
- Glossary of tennis terms
- Tennis shots
