= Groundstroke =

Type of shot in racket sports

In racket sports a groundstroke, or ground stroke, refers to a forehand or backhand shot that is executed after the ball has bounced on the court. The term is commonly used in the sports of tennis and pickleball, and is counter to a volley shot which is taken before the ball has bounced. Groundstrokes in tennis are usually hit from the back of the court, around the baseline.

There are many factors that may define a good groundstroke. For example, one groundstroke may use topspin and another backspin. Both can be effective for different reasons having to do with depth, opponent's strength or weaknesses, etc. Some characteristics of groundstrokes are: depth (how close the ball lands to the opponent's baseline), consistency (the tendency of groundstrokes to not drop short or into an opponent's strike range in rallies with many groundstrokes), speed (how fast it travels in the air), pace (the ball's behavior after it bounces on the opponent's side), trajectory and angle. If a "good groundstroke" is to be played, it would generally have a combination of the above characteristics to produce a shot that is difficult for the opponent to return. Generally, a groundstroke that lands deep and in the corner of the opponent's court will make it more difficult for the opponent to return the ball. However, this is somewhat arbitrary and depends on the opponent and stage of the point being played. For example, a short angled shot, a moon ball (very high trajectory), an off pace shot, etc., may prove effective against opponent A but not opponent B.

In tennis, a player whose strategy is to trade groundstrokes with the opponent is termed a baseliner, as opposed to volleyers who prefer to hit volleys near the net.

== See also ==
- Glossary of tennis terms
- Glossary of pickleball
- Tennis shots
- Serve
- Volley
- Smash
