= Lob (tennis) =

Hitting technique in tennis

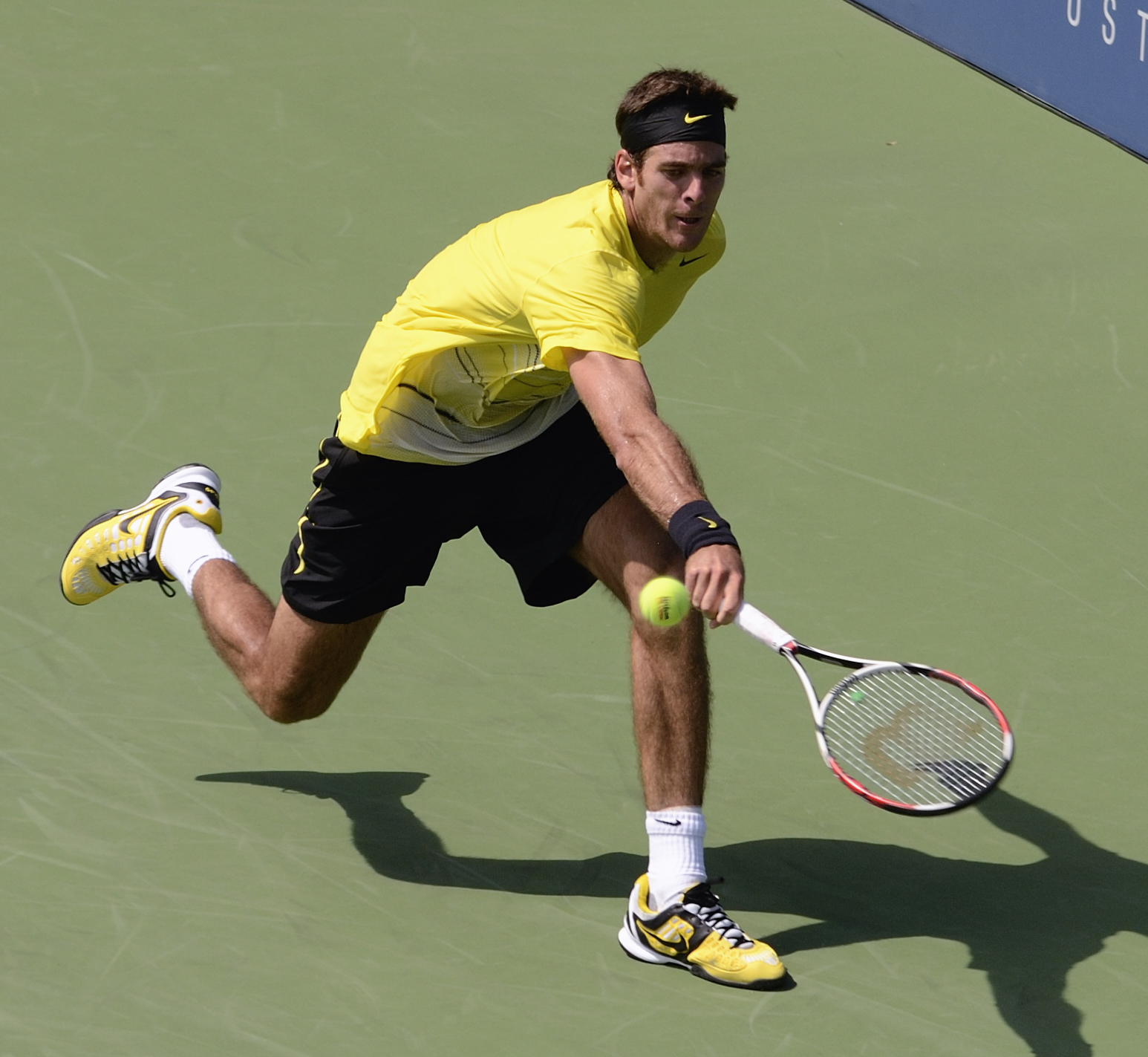
Defensive lob

A lob in tennis involves hitting the ball high and deep into the opponent's court. It can be used as an offensive or defensive weapon.

== History ==
A lob is usually hit when an opponent is standing near the net, waiting to volley. The ball should pass over the opponent and into the open court behind. A good offensive lob cannot be reached by the opponent, yet it is low enough and has enough pace and spin so that the opponent can not run back and chase it down. It can win the point outright, although with some risks involved. Topspin greatly enhances the effectiveness of an offensive lob but also makes the stroke more difficult. When executing the lob, players usually hit the ball at an angle between 0 degrees (flat) and 45 degrees (diagonal). Some players, such as Andre Agassi, Michael Chang, Andy Murray and Lleyton Hewitt, have developed good offensive lobs.

A defensive lob requires the opponent to retreat to the baseline and prolongs the point. When a player is out of court, playing a defensive lob can buy time to run back and adopt a better defensive position.

An unsuccessful lob is susceptible to being smashed.

In doubles, spin or slice is applied to the lob, so it will go over the head of a player at the net and bounce away from the baseline player.

Some players are able to manipulate a lob so that it appears the shot is overhit, but dips enough to fall within the baseline, often deceiving the opponent. This is created by generating a great amount of backspin, slicing or cutting the ball over the head of the other player. This shot, which can also be hit with tremendous topspin, is called a "moon volley or moon lob.

The lob was introduced by Frank Hadow, the second Wimbledon champion, using the technique to defeat Spencer Gore.

Grass courts dominated the early Grand Slams, with three of the four major tournaments featuring the soft surface of the natural ground. Because of this, the ball could always touch the grass on the field, and later on, in a match, such coverings became torn resulting in poor bounces. This made the majority of players to prefer to serve as well as volley to avoid bad bounces. Initially, there were two significant styles of playing tennis.

There was Australia's style, as well as, American style. The Aussies were proponents of the "one grip fits all" philosophy, and stripped tennis down to its bare basics. The rule insisted that if one had to use "one grip for all," it needed to be the continental grip. In addition to that continental grip, their primary tactic was to serve and volley, but they also applied the backhands. Their weakest area was the forehand.

The second evolution was the reverse forehand lob. This lob became associated with the tennis player Pete Sampras. Sampras, even today, remains cemented among the legendary for his huge serve. The reverse forehand lob was a newly designed passing shot, for this the forehand became a stable of the current passing shot. This shot was to be either a short hit, a sharp crosscut, or maybe hit deep up the line.

Most of the tennis court offers a lot of space near the baseline, and this has led the majority of players to stand at the baseline and attempt the standing back lob. This maneuver was mostly for the defensive players, as they used it to strike the ball faster, as well as, at sharp angles, mainly during the 1970s.

The windshield-wiper forehand can also provide a lob shot in tennis. During the old days, the forehand was often accompanied by a high follow-through. Used by players such as Pete Sampras, it reached its novelty in the 1990s but became the staple in the 2000s.

The next type of lob that appeared on the tennis scene was called the "squash shot forehand," it was a defensive lob, and it was great during its day. Today this shot offers a solution to the sole forehand. In the old days, the "Recovery slice backhand" lob was used to approach the net. In addition to that, it was more offensive shot. Today it is used to recover.

"The swinging volley," was an innovation of Lendl’s. It employed strong topspin forehands and even more of the volley. It is also used today by players such as Roger Federer but was more common in the 1980s. Big servers used it the most.

The "kick serve" lob has been in use for the relatively extended period. Though it has little fame, it is still used to have the ball "kick" over the opponents head during serving.

== See also ==
- Glossary of tennis terms
- Tennis shots
