= Backspin =

Form of rotation of a ball in various sports

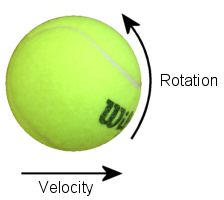

In sports, backspin or underspin refers to the reverse rotation of a ball, in relation to the ball's trajectory, that is imparted on the ball by a slice or chop shot. Backspin generates an upward force that lifts the ball (see Magnus effect). While a normal hit bounces well forward as well as up, backspin shots bounce higher and less forward. Backspin is the opposite of topspin.

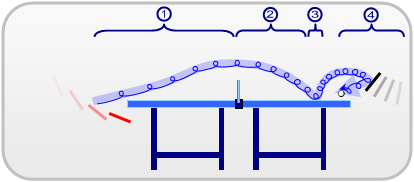
4 phases in a backspin curve in table tennis

In racket sports, the higher bounce imparted by backspin may make a receiver who has prepared for a different shot miss or mis-hit the ball when swinging. A backspin shot is also useful for defensive shots because a backspin shot takes longer to travel to the opponent, giving the defender more time to get back into position. Also, because backspin shots tend to bounce less far forward once they reach the opposite court, they may be more difficult to attack. This is especially important in table tennis because one must wait for the ball to bounce before hitting it, whereas in tennis the opponent may volley the ball.

In golf, a well-struck shot will result in a large amount of backspin that will carry the ball higher into the air and further. Backspin will also help with distance control and, if there is enough backspin, the ball will "check" if it lands on the putting surface, and sometimes even creep backwards (in the opposite direction that the ball was flying) upon landing.

== See also ==
- Spin (cue sports), types of spin
- Spin (pickleball), definition and types of spin
- Spin (table tennis), effects of spin
- Groundstroke
- Magnus effect
- Bernoulli's principle

== Sources ==
- The Physics of Sports by Angelo Armenti
