= Half volley =

Tennis shot

A half volley in tennis is a shot that is hit immediately after the ball bounces but before it reaches the apex of its bounce. It is sometimes called an "on the rise shot", or "short hop".

== Technique ==
The player who is hitting the half volley should not take a full backswing, but should still follow through. The grip for this shot is a standard continental. Also, staying down when hitting the shot is very important, or else it will go long. This is the basic form for the volley, hence the name: half volley. The two parts of the tennis court where this shot is generally used are on the baseline and the service line.

== Strategy ==
A half volley is a difficult shot to make. Often a player hits a half volley only when forced by the opponent or caught out of position.

The half-volley came to prominence in the hands of George Caridia and Ernest Lewis in the early 1900s. Arguably the greatest half-volleyer in history is John McEnroe; other professionals such as Stefan Edberg, Pete Sampras and Roger Federer had excellent half volleys that were used as weapons.

In his 1979 autobiography Jack Kramer devotes a page to the best tennis strokes he had ever seen. He writes: "HALF-VOLLEY—Gonzales and Rosewall. Kenny had to learn to hit a half-volley because his serve was so weak that he had to pick up shots at his feet as he came to the net. With his great serve, I don't know why Gorgo had to hit so many half-volleys, but he sure learned how."
