= Topspin =

Property of a rotating ball

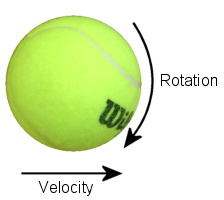

In ball sports, topspin or overspin is a property of a ball that rotates forwards as it is moving. Topspin on a ball propelled through the air imparts a downward force that causes the ball to drop, due to its interaction with the air (Magnus effect). Topspin is the opposite of backspin.

== Baseball ==
In baseball, the curveball, a type of pitch which usually has downward movement, is thrown in such a way as to put topspin on the ball. Its close relatives are the slider and the slurve. The "curve" of the ball varies from pitcher to pitcher.

== Cue sports ==
In snooker, pocket billiards and billiards, players use topspin to keep the cue ball moving, including after it hits other balls. They get top spin by hitting the cue against the top of the ball.

== Cricket ==
In cricket, a top-spinner is a type of delivery bowled by a cricketer bowling either wrist spin or finger spin. In either case, the bowler imparts the ball with top spin by twisting it with his or her fingers prior to delivery. In both cases, the topspinner is the halfway house between the stock delivery and the wrong'un - in the wrist spinner's case his googly, and in the finger spinner's case his doosra.

A topspinning cricket ball behaves similarly to top spin shots in tennis or table tennis. The forward spinning motion impedes air travelling over the ball, but assists air travelling underneath. The difference in air pressure above and underneath the ball (described as the Magnus effect) acts as a downward force, meaning that the ball falls earlier and faster than normal.

In cricketing terms, this means that the ball drops shorter, falls faster and bounces higher than might otherwise be anticipated by the batsman. These properties are summed up in cricketing terms as a "looping" or "loopy" delivery. Also, the ball travels straight on, as compared to a wrist spin or finger spin stock delivery that breaks to the left or right on impact. A batsman may easily be deceived by the ball, particularly given that the action is quite similar to the stock delivery.

In delivery, the topspinner is gripped like a normal side spinner. For a legspinner the back of the hand faces the cover region and the palm of the hand faces the mid wicket region at release. For an offspiner, these directions are reversed. The ball is then released either with the seam going straight on to the batsman, or with a scrambled seam. A spinner will frequently bowl deliveries with both top spin and side spin. A ball presenting with roughly equal amounts of both is usually called an "overspinning" leg break or off break.

Tactically, a bowler will bowl topspinners to draw a batsman forward before using the dip and extra bounce to deceive them. In particular, batsmen looking to sweep or drive are vulnerable as the bounce can defeat them. In modern-day cricket Anil Kumble is considered the foremost leg spin exponent of the top spinner. Muttiah Muralitharan is an example of an offspinner who frequently uses this delivery.

== Golf ==
In golf, shots may also have topspin, although this is nearly always the undesirable consequence of a topped shot.

== Racket sports ==
The topspin shot (also called a topspinner) is used by racket sport players primarily as either a "safe shot" or rally ball, or it can also be used to construct a point. For example, a player may hit three topspin shots crosscourt, and then on the fourth shot hit a flat ball or a slice down the line to set him/herself up to win the point.

A topspin shot can be generated by hitting the ball with an up-and-forward swing, with the racquet facing below the direction it is moving. A topspin shot is the opposite of a "slice". The topspin shot is effective on hard surfaces. The ball spins forward and descends toward the ground quicker, so it can be hit with more force compared to another type of shot.

=== Table tennis ===
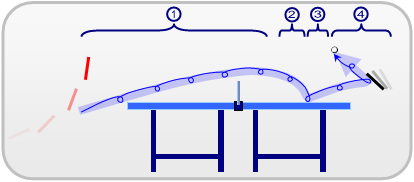
Top spin in table tennis. The ball would have fallen off the table if trajectory had not bent downwards due to spin.

In competitive table tennis, effective command of topspin is indispensable, not only in order to be able to execute an attack shot counter to a backspin ball, but also in order to be able to execute a speed shot when the ball is already lower than the net. In table tennis the best defense for a top spin loop is a block close to the table which involves a firm fixation of the paddle and a slight movement forwards with an angle less than 90 degrees. Another way of defending the topspin is to counterattack with a topspin or slice the ball.

=== Tennis ===
Other than trajectory in air, top spin lets the bounce of the ball be flatter than without spin.

In tennis, because of a net being in the middle of the court, using topspin will increase the player's consistency. Topspin also allows a player a greater margin of error. Because topspin brings the ball down toward the ground quicker, a player can hit the ball higher over the net, thus increasing the margin of error. This may help in lobbing an opponent who is waiting at the net, or playing directly to a player's feet. Hitting low to high as the player approaches the contact point will impart lift. Keeping the racquet face (the strings) slightly closed from perpendicular will impart the topspin to the ball that the player wants. Balls that bounce lower due to greater force or backspin are much more difficult to return using a grip that confers topspin such as the semi-western and western grips, as the racket is angled too far downwards to 'lift' the ball back over the net. As such, topspin is more effectively used on slower, higher bouncing surfaces such as clay. Topspin is also far more difficult to impart on backhand strokes due to the physical limitations of an arm stretched across the body.

On most court surfaces, topspin also makes the ball bounce lower. As a result, it is often used on clay or "soft" court surfaces which have a naturally higher bounce to make the ball harder for the opponent to hit. An opponent with a one-handed backhand is especially vulnerable to a topspin shot because it is difficult to hit a low ball with a one-handed backhand.

=== Pickleball ===
As in tennis, topspin is used in pickleball with serves, forehands and sometimes the backhand.

=== Volleyball ===
Topspin is used within volleyball.

== Physical explanation ==
The Magnus effect, demonstrated on a ball. v represents the wind velocity, the arrow F the resulting force towards the side of lower pressure.

Topspin on a shot imparts a downward force that causes the ball to drop, due to its interaction with the air, called Magnus effect. In racquet sports, it can be generated by hitting the ball with an up-and-forward swing, with the racquet facing below the direction it is moving. A topspin shot is the opposite of the slice; topspin itself is the opposite of backspin.

One way of explaining the Magnus effect is that - because of the rotation and the fact that air acts as a viscous or "sticky" substance on the surface of the ball, a stream of air in the wake of the ball is being ejected upwards. As a reaction to this, the ball is pushed downwards.

Often Bernoulli's principle is used to explain the topspin effect, as the difference in speed between ball surface and air is greater on the top of the ball. For example, if the air flowing past the bottom of the ball is moving faster than the air flowing past the top then Bernoulli's principle implies that the pressure on the surfaces of the ball will be lower below than above. In other words, since there is more air friction occurring on the top surface of the ball compared to the bottom, this differential causes a greater pressure to be applied on the top of the ball, resulting in the ball being pushed down.

== See also ==
- Spin (cue sports), types of spin
- Spin (pickleball), definition and types of spin
- Spin (table tennis), effects of spin
- Backspin
