= Return of service =

Return of service may refer to:

- Return of service, a proof of service of process
- Returning a serve in tennis
