= Double fault (tennis) =

Combo of 2 mistakes in tennis

In tennis, if the serving player makes two mistakes in the same point, it is called a double fault, and they lose the point which is awarded to their opponent.

== Amateur Era singles records ==
Gerald Patterson allegedly holds the record for the most double faults committed in a Grand Slam final: he committed 27 double faults in a 71-game match against John Hawkes in the 1927 Australian Championships, but still managed to clinch the victory.

At the 1957 Wimbledon Championships, Maria de Amorin committed 17 double faults in a row in her second-round encounter against Berna Thung. De Amorin took a set off her opponent, but eventually lost the match.

== Open Era singles records ==
Double faults have been officially recorded by the top-level professional tennis circuits since 1991.

Only main draw singles matches are included here.

Key
W	F	SF	QF	#R	RR	Q#	P#	DNQ	A	Z#	PO	G	S	B	NMS	NTI	P	NH

(W) winner; (F) finalist; (SF) semifinalist; (QF) quarterfinalist; (#R) rounds 4, 3, 2, 1; (RR) round-robin stage; (Q#) qualification round; (P#) preliminary round; (DNQ) did not qualify; (A) absent; (Z#) Davis/Fed Cup Zonal Group (with number indication) or (PO) play-off; (G) gold, (S) silver or (B) bronze Olympic/Paralympic medal; (NMS) not a Masters tournament; (NTI) not a Tier I tournament; (P) postponed; (NH) not held; (SR) strike rate (events won / competed); (W–L) win–loss record.

=== ATP Tour ===
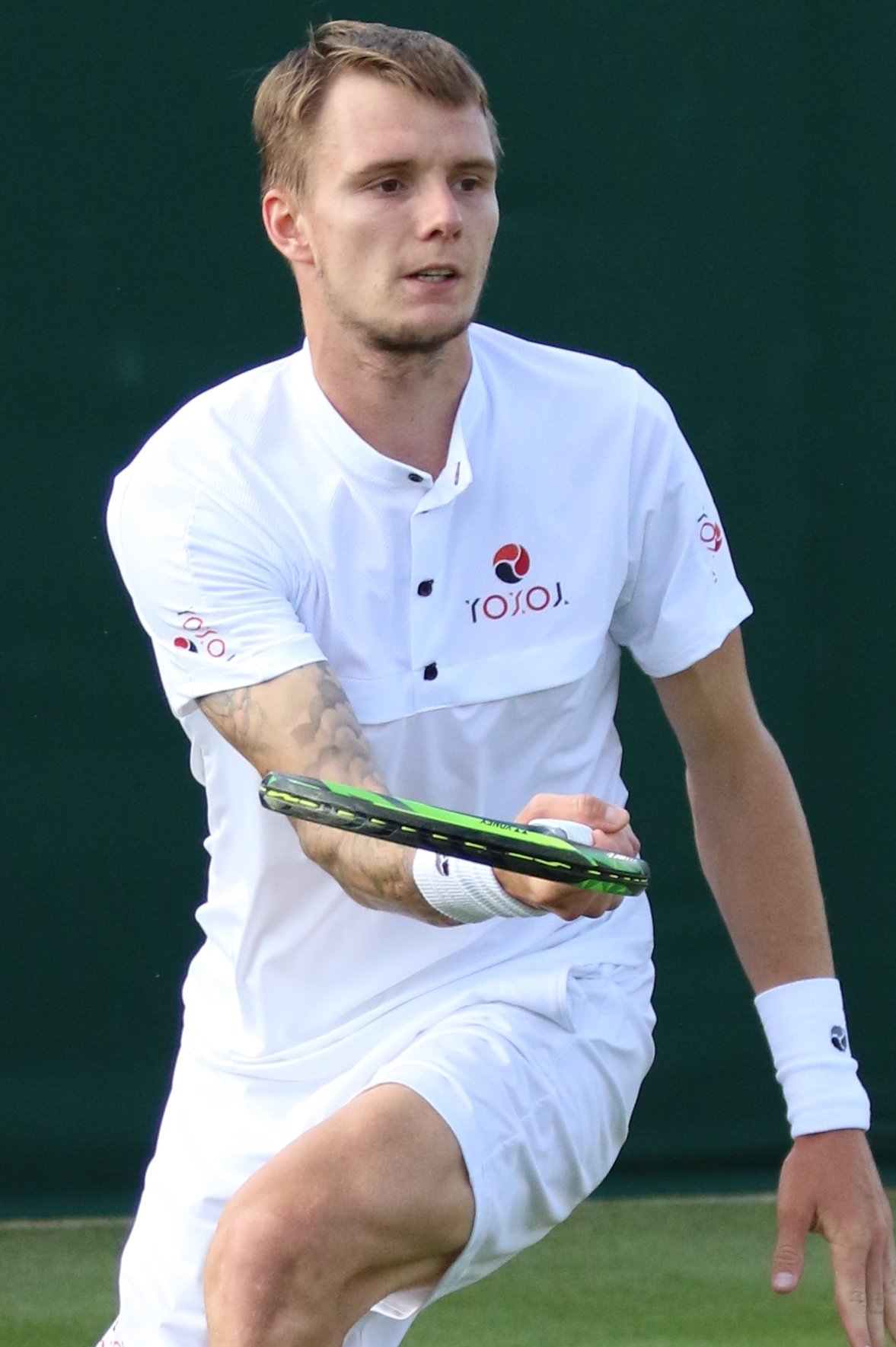
Alexander Bublik is one of only three players to have committed more than 25 double faults in a Grand Slam match.

Among all players, active or retired, the worst average of double faults per match, shared between Henrik Holm and Radomír Vašek, is 7.2, while Gilbert Schaller has the best average, at 1.0.

==== Most double faults in a match ====
#	Player	W/L	Opponent	Round	Event	Sets	Surface	Ref.
30	(Switzerland) Marc Rosset	L	(France) Arnaud Clément	QF	2001 Davis Cup	5	Carpet (i)	
27	(Croatia) Goran Ivanišević	L	(India) Leander Paes	PO	1995 Davis Cup	5	Grass	
26	(Switzerland) Marc Rosset	L	(United States) Michael Joyce	1R	1995 Wimbledon	4	Grass	
26	(Kazakhstan) Alexander Bublik	W	(Italy) Thomas Fabbiano	2R	2019 US Open	5	Hard	
26	(France) Pierre-Hugues Herbert	L	(Spain) Pablo Andújar	1R	2021 Wimbledon	5	Grass	

==== Most double faults in a three-setter ====
#	Player	W/L	Opponent	Round	Event	Surface	Ref.
25	(United States) Maxime Cressy	L	(Canada) Felix Auger-Aliassime	1R	2023 Dubai	Hard	

==== Most double faults in a two-setter ====
#	Player	W/L	Opponent	Round	Event	Surface	Ref.
16	(Argentina) Guillermo Coria	L	(Italy) Alessio di Mauro	1R	2006 Acapulco	Clay	

==== Most consecutive double faults ====
#	Player	W/L	Opponent	Round	Event	Surface	Ref.
5	(United Kingdom) Greg Rusedski	W	(Russia) Mikhail Youzhny	1R	2006 Miami	Hard	

==== Committing four consecutive double faults in a single game ====
Player	W/L	Opponent	Round	Event	Surface	Ref.
(Germany) Boris Becker	W	(France) Jean-Philippe Fleurian	SF	1995 Hopman Cup	Hard	
(France) Cédric Pioline	L	(Belarus) Vladimir Voltchkov	2R	2000 Wimbledon	Grass	
(Argentina) Guillermo Coria	W	(Germany) Nicolas Kiefer	3R	2006 Monte Carlo	Clay	
(Spain) Fernando Verdasco	L	(Russia) Teymuraz Gabashvili	2R	2014 Australian Open	Hard	
(Germany) Mischa Zverev	L	(Bulgaria) Grigor Dimitrov	2R	2017 Montreal	Hard	
(France) Benoît Paire	L	(Italy) Fabio Fognini	RR	2021 ATP Cup	Hard	
(United States) Maxime Cressy	W	(France) Geoffrey Blancaneaux	1R	2023 Marseille	Hard (i)	

=== WTA Tour ===
Anna Kournikova holds the record for the most double faults in a match with 31, in a clash against Miho Saeki that has been labeled as "one of most feeble and unintentionally comical matches of all time".

==== Most double faults in a match ====
#	Player	W/L	Opponent	Round	Event	Sets	Surface	Ref.
31	(Russia) Anna Kournikova	W	(Japan) Miho Saeki	2R	1999 Australian Open	3	Hard	
28	(Italy) Raffaella Reggi	L	(Canada) Helen Kelesi	QF	1988 Rome	2	Clay	
28	(Australia) Jelena Dokic	L	(Germany) Julia Schruff	1R	2006 Auckland	3	Hard	
27	(Russia) Anastasia Pavlyuchenkova	L	(Kazakhstan) Galina Voskoboeva	QF	2011 Baku	3	Hard	
23	(United States) Coco Gauff	W	(United States) Danielle Collins	2R	2025 Montreal	3	Hard	

==== Most double faults in a game ====
#	Player	W/L	Opponent	Round	Event	Sets	Surface	Ref.
7	(Latvia) Jeļena Ostapenko	W	(United States) Alison Riske	2R	2019 US Open	2	Hard	
7	(China) Zheng Qinwen	W	(United States) Ashlyn Krueger	1R	2024 Australian Open	3	Hard	
6	(United States) Danielle Collins	L	(Tunisia) Ons Jabeur	3R	2021 Indian Wells	2	Hard	
6	(Belarus) Aryna Sabalenka	W	(China) Xinyu Wang	2R	2022 Australian Open	2	Hard	

== See also ==
- Ace (tennis)
