= Tennis scoring system =

Way to keep track of tennis matches

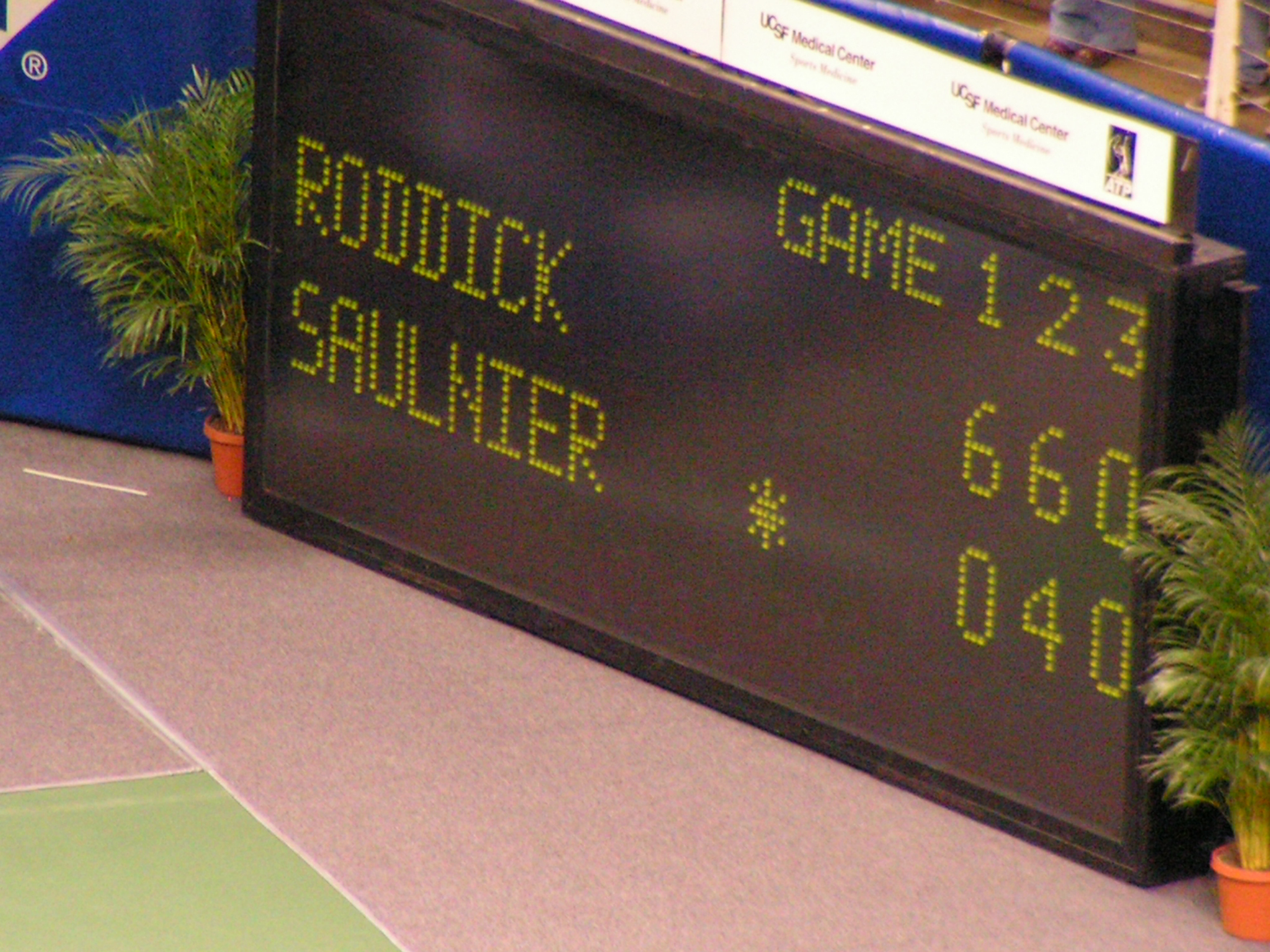
The score for the 2005 Men's Final of the SAP Open, San Jose. The winner was Andy Roddick and the runner-up was Cyril Saulnier.

The tennis scoring system is a standard widespread method for scoring tennis matches, including pick-up games. Some tennis matches are played as part of a tournament, which may have various categories, such as singles and doubles. The great majority are organised as a single-elimination tournament, with competitors being eliminated after a single loss, and the overall winner being the last competitor without a loss. Optimally, such tournaments have a number of competitors equal to a power of two in order to fully fill out a single elimination bracket. In many professional and top-level amateur events, the brackets are seeded according to a recognised ranking system, in order to keep the best players in the field from facing each other until as late in the tournament as possible; additionally, if byes are necessary because of a less-than-full bracket, those byes in the first round are usually given to the highest-seeded competitors.

A tennis match is composed of points, games, and sets. A set consists of a number of games (a minimum of six), which in turn each consist of points. A set is won by the first side to win six games, with a margin of at least two games over the other side (e.g. 6–4 or 7–5). If the set is tied at six games each, a tiebreak is usually played to decide the set. A match is won when a player or a doubles team has won the majority of the prescribed number of sets. Matches employ either a best-of-three (first to two sets wins) or best-of-five (first to three sets wins) set format. The best-of-five set format is usually only used in the men's singles matches at Grand Slam tournaments.

== Game score ==
=== Description ===
A game consists of a sequence of points played with the same player serving. A game is won by the first side to win at least four points and have a margin of two points or more over their opponent. Normally, the server's score is always called first and the receiver's score second. Score calling in tennis is unusual in that (except in tiebreaks) each point has a corresponding call that is different from its point value. The current point score is announced orally before each point by the umpire, or by the server if there is no umpire.

| Number of points won | Corresponding call |
|---|---|
| 0 | "love" |
| 1 | "15" |
| 2 | "30" |
| 3 | "40” |
| 4 | "game" |

For instance, if the server has won three points so far in the game, and the non-server has won one, the score is "40–15".

When both sides have won one point within a given game, the score is described as "15 all." Likewise, the score is described as "30 all" when both have won two points. However, if each player has won three points, the score is called as "deuce" rather than "40 all". From that point on in the game, whenever the score is tied, it is called "deuce" regardless of how many points have been played.

If the score is called in French (for example at the French Open), the first occurrence of "40 all" in a single game may be called as such ("40–A", "quarante–A", or "quarante partout"). Thereafter, "deuce" ("égalité" in French) is used for all other occurrences when the score returns to "40 all" within the same game.

In standard play, scoring beyond a "deuce" score, in which the players have scored three points each, requires that one player must get two points ahead in order to win the game. This type of tennis scoring is known as "advantage scoring" (or "adv"). The side that wins the next point after deuce is said to have the advantage. If they lose the next point, the score is again deuce, since the score is tied. If the side with the advantage wins the next point, that side has won the game, since they have a lead of two points. When the server is the player with the advantage, the score may be called as "advantage in". When the server's opponent has the advantage, the score may be called as "advantage out". These phrases are sometimes shortened to "ad in" or "van in" (or "my ad") and "ad out" (or "your ad"). Alternatively, the players' names can be used: in professional tournaments, the umpire announces the score in this format (e.g., "advantage Nadal" or "advantage Williams").

In the USTA rule book (but not the ITF rules), there is the following comment: " 'Zero', 'one', 'two', and 'three' may be substituted for 'Love', '15', '30', and '40'. This is particularly appropriate for matches with an inexperienced player or in which one player does not understand English."

=== History ===
The origins of the 15, 30, and 40 scores are believed to be medieval French. The earliest reference is in a ballad by Charles D'Orleans in 1435 which refers to quarante cinq ("forty-five"), which gave rise to modern 40. In 1522, there is a sentence in Latin, "we are winning 30, we are winning 45". The first recorded theories about the origin of 15 were published in 1555 and 1579. However, the origins of this convention remain obscure.

Some believe that clock faces were used to keep score on court, with a quarter move of the minute hand to indicate a score of 15, 30, and 45. When the hand moved to 60, the game was over. However, in order to ensure that the game could not be won by a one-point difference in players' scores, the idea of "deuce" was introduced. To make the score stay within the 60 ticks on the clock face, the 45 was changed to 40. Therefore, if both players had 40, the first player to score would receive ten, and that would move the clock to 50. If that player scored a second time in a row, they would be awarded another ten and the clock would move to 60, signifying the end of the game. However, if the player failed to score twice in a row, then the clock would move back to 40 to establish another "deuce".

Although this suggestion might sound attractive, the first reference to tennis scoring (as mentioned above) is in the 15th century, and at that time clocks measured only the hours (1 to 12). It was not until about 1690, when the more accurate pendulum escapement was invented, that clocks regularly had minute hands. Therefore, the concept of tennis scores originating from the clock face could not have come from medieval times.

However, the clock at the Wells Cathedral in England, which dates from 1386, had an inner dial with 60 minutes and a minute indicator and chimed every quarter hour. Likewise, the clock erected in 1389 at Rouen, France, chimed every fifteen minutes. By the end of the 14th century, the most advanced clocks would have marked minutes and chimed on the quarter hours. Clock faces like these would likely have been familiar to the English and French nobles by 1435 and 1522. It is not hard to imagine that they might have used a mock-up of a clock face to keep score, and that they would score by quarter hours since that is when the clocks chimed.

Another theory is that the scoring nomenclature came from the French game jeu de paume (a precursor to tennis which initially used the hand instead of a racket). Jeu de paume, now known in English as real tennis, was very popular before the French Revolution, with more than 1,000 courts in Paris alone. The traditional court was 90 feet (pieds du roi) in length with 45 feet on each side. The server moved 15 feet closer after scoring, another 15 feet after scoring again, and an additional 10 feet by scoring a third time. (For reference: the French foot is 6.5% larger than the imperial foot.) This theory also lacks plausibility, as multiple reliable sources indicate that there was no standard length for real tennis (jeu de paume) courts in medieval times nor indeed in the ensuing centuries.

More plausibly, the use of base 60 for counting, accounting and games has been used in many societies for thousands of years, including the use of Sexagesimal for counting in the very earliest civilisations, and the Carolingian monetary system used widely in Europe between the 8th and 18th centuries. In medieval times, players and spectators regularly wagered on tennis, so alignment with the then prevailing money system is a likely cause of the game scoring system using 4 x 15 to achieve 60.

The use of "love" for zero probably derives from the phrase "playing for love", meaning "without stakes being wagered, for nothing". Another explanation is that it derives from the French expression for "the egg" (l'œuf) because an egg looks like the number zero. This is similar to the origin of the term "duck" in cricket, supposedly from "duck's egg", referring to a batsman who has been called out without scoring a run. Another possibility comes from the Dutch expression iets voor lof doen, which means to do something for praise, implying no monetary stakes. Another theory on the origins of the use of "love" comes from the notion that, at the start of any match, when scores are at zero, players still have "love for each other".

=== Alternative ("no-ad") game scoring ===
A popular alternative to advantage scoring, nowadays used at exhibition matches as well as professional tournaments in doubles, is the "no-advantage" or "no-ad" scoring, created by James Van Alen in order to shorten match playing time. No-advantage scoring is a method in which the first player to reach four points wins the game in all circumstances. No-ad scoring eliminates the requirement that a player must win by two points after a tie. Therefore, if the game is tied at deuce, the next player to win a point wins the game. This method of scoring was used in most World TeamTennis matches. When this style of play is implemented, at deuce the receiver chooses from which side of the court he or she desires to return the serve. However, in no-ad mixed doubles play, each gender always serves to the same gender at game point and during the final point of tiebreaks.

=== Handicap scoring ===
In the early 20th century, it was common for tournaments to have handicap events alongside the main events. In handicap events, the lesser-skilled player is given a certain number of points in each game. This is done so that players of different skill levels can have a competitive match. These handicaps consisted of two numbers separated by a period: "A.B", where "A" is the player's starting score and "B" is the number of games where the player receives an extra point.

For example, a player with a handicap of "15.2" would start every game with a score of "15". In each series of six games, the player would also receive an extra point in two of the games. Therefore, they would start two out of every six games with "30" and the remaining four out of six games with "15".

These handicap ratings where a player receives points can be denoted with an "R" in front, where the "R" indicates the player is receiving points. It is also possible to have a handicap system where the player owes points due to being higher-skilled, in which case the same two-number system is also used. These owed handicaps are denoted with an "O" in front that is short for "owed".

== Set score ==
=== Description ===
In tennis, a set consists of a sequence of games played with alternating service and return roles. There are two types of set formats that require different types of scoring.

An advantage set is played until a player or team has won at least six games and that player or team has a two-game lead over their opponent(s). The set continues until a player or team wins the set by two games.

A tiebreak set is played with the same rules as the advantage set, except that when the score is tied at 6–6, a tiebreak game ("tiebreaker") is played. Typically, the tiebreaker continues until one side has won seven points with a margin of two or more points. However, many tiebreakers are played with different tiebreak point requirements, such as 8 or 10 points. Often, a seven-point tiebreaker is played when the set score is tied at 6–6 to determine who wins the set. If the tiebreak score gets to 6–6, then whichever player to win the best of two points wins the set.

Beginning in the early 1970s, the tiebreak set was widely adopted by many tournaments, including the Grand Slam tournaments for all sets except the final set. From 1970 to 2018, the US Open was the only major to use a tiebreak set in the final set. In 2019 the Australian Open adopted the final set tiebreak at 6–6 and Wimbledon adopted the tiebreak when the set was tied 12–12. In 2022, the French Open adopted a final set tiebreaker at 6–6 and Wimbledon also adopted a tiebreak at 6–6. This meant from 2022 all final sets in Grand Slam tournaments would be decided by a fifth set tiebreak at 6–6.

Mixed doubles mostly uses a unique match tiebreak which replaces the third set with a tiebreak game. The pair that reaches ten points with a margin of two or more points wins the match. The Australian Open first created the format in 2001, the US Open adopted it in 2003, and the French Open adopted it in 2007, while Wimbledon continues to use a regular tie-break set -except for the 2024 edition where delays caused by weather conditions lead to adopting match tiebreak scoring.

=== Tiebreak scoring ===
At a game score of 6–6, a set is often determined by one more game called a "tiebreaker". Only one more game is played to determine the winner of the set; the score of the resulting completed set is 7–6 or 6–7 (though it can be 6–6 if a player retires before completion).

Most tiebreaks require a player to get seven points and have two more points than their opponent; these are referred to as a "seven-point tiebreak.” For example, if the point score is 6–5 and the player with six points wins the next point, they win both the tiebreak (seven points to five) and the set (seven games to six). If the player with five points wins the point instead (for a score of 6–6), the tiebreak continues and cannot be won on the next point (7–6 or 6–7), since no player will be two points ahead.

Some tiebreaks, called a "super tiebreak" or "ten-point tiebreak", require the player to get ten points and have two more points than their opponent. These are used by the Grand Slam tournaments in the final set.

Unlike games, set scores are counted in the ordinary manner (1, 2, 3, etc.), except that the state of having won zero games is called "love". The score is called at the end of each game, with the leading player's score first (e.g. "A leads 3–2"), or as "X–all". When a player wins a set, it is called as "game and first set", "game and second set", etc. For tiebreaks, the calls are simply the number of points won by each player:

Tiebreak scoring
| Score | Corresponding call |
|---|---|
| 1–0 | "one, zero" |
| 4–3 | "four, three" |
| 4–4, 5–5, 6–6, etc. | "four all", "five all", "six all", etc. |
| 4–7, 10–8, etc. | "set" |

In the scoring of the set, sometimes the tiebreak points are shown as well as the game count (e.g., 7–6^{10–8}). Another way of listing the score of the tiebreak is to list only the loser's points. For example, if the set score is listed as 7–6^{(8)}, the tiebreak score was 10–8 (since the eight is the loser's score, and the winner must win by two points). Similarly, 7–6^{(3)} means the tiebreak score was 7–3.

The player who would normally be serving after 6–6 is the one to serve first in the tiebreak, and the tiebreak is considered a service game for this player. The server begins his or her service from the deuce court and serves one point. Subsequently, the serve changes to the first server's opponent. Each player then serves two consecutive points for the remainder of the tiebreak. The first of each two-point sequence starts from the server's advantage court and the second starts from the deuce court. In this way, the sum of the scores is even when the server serves from the deuce court. After every six points, the players switch ends of the court; note that the side-changes during the tiebreak will occur in the middle of a server's two-point sequence. Following the tiebreak, the players switch ends of the court again, since the set score is always odd (13 games).

In doubles, service alternates between the teams. One player serves for an entire service game, with that player's partner serving for the entirety of the team's next service game. Players of the receiving team receive the serve on alternating points, with each player of the receiving team declaring which side of the court (deuce or ad side) they will receive serve on for the duration of the set. Teams alternate service games every game.

An alternative tiebreak system called the "Coman Tie-Break" is sometimes used by the United States Tennis Association. Scoring is the same, but end changes take place after the first point and then after every four points. This approach allows the servers of doubles teams to continue serving from the same end of the court as during the body of the set. It also reduces the advantage the elements (e.g. wind and sun) could give playing the first six points of a seven-point tiebreak on one side of the court. Another tiebreak system, called the "super tiebreaker", consists of one player reaching a total of 10 points. The player must win by two points so there is no limit to the highest number of points. A typically close score may look like 10–8.

==== History of the tiebreak ====
The tiebreaker—commonly shortened to just "tiebreak"—was invented by James Van Alen and unveiled in 1965 as an experiment at the pro tournament he sponsored at Newport Casino, Rhode Island, after an earlier, unsuccessful attempt to speed up the game by the use of his so-called "Van Alen Streamlined Scoring System" (VASSS). For two years before the Open Era, in 1955 and 1956, the United States Pro Championship in Cleveland, Ohio, was played by VASSS rules. The scoring was the same as that in table tennis, with sets played to 21 points and players alternating five services, with no second service. The rules were created partially to limit the effectiveness of the powerful service of the reigning professional champion, Pancho Gonzales. Even with the new rules, however, Gonzales beat Pancho Segura in the finals of both tournaments. Even though the 1955 match went to five sets, with Gonzales barely holding on to win the last one 21–19, it is reported to have taken 47 minutes to complete. The fans attending the matches preferred the traditional rules, however, and in 1957 the tournament reverted to the old method of scoring.

Van Alen called his innovation a "tiebreaker", and he proposed two different versions: the "best-five-of-nine-points" tiebreaker and the "best-seven-of-twelve-points" tiebreaker.

The "best-five-of-nine-point" tiebreaker lasts a maximum of nine points, and awards victory in the set to whichever player or team first reaches five points, even if the other player or team already has four: the margin of victory can be a single point. Because this tiebreaker must end after a maximum of nine points, Van Alen also called it a "sudden-death tiebreaker" (if and when the score reaches four-all, both players face simultaneous set point and match point). This type of tiebreaker had its Grand Slam debut at the 1970 US Open, where it was employed until 1974. It was also used for a while on the Virginia Slims circuit and in American college tennis. This format is still used at the World TeamTennis.

The "best-seven-of-twelve-point" tiebreaker lasts a minimum of seven points. This is the most familiar and widely used tiebreaker today. Because it ends as soon as either player or team reaches seven points and has a lead of at least two points, it can actually be over in as few as seven points. However, due to this required two-point margin, this tiebreaker can go beyond 12 points—sometimes well beyond. Because of this, Van Alen derisively likened it to a "lingering death", in contrast to the "sudden-death tiebreaker" that he recommended and preferred.

The impetus to use some kind of a tiebreaking procedure gained force after a monumental 1969 struggle at Wimbledon between Pancho Gonzales and Charlie Pasarell. This was a 5-set match that lasted 5 hours and 12 minutes, and took two days to complete. In the fifth set, the 41-year-old Gonzales won all seven match points Pasarell had against him, twice coming back from 0–40 deficits. The final score was 22–24, 1–6, 16–14, 6–3, 11–9 for Gonzales.

In 1970, the US Open introduced the nine-point tiebreaker rule for all sets that reach 6–6, both in singles and in doubles. The seven-point tiebreaker format was introduced in 1975.

In 1971, Wimbledon put into effect a seven-point tiebreaker when the score in a set reached 8–8 in games unless the set was such that one of the players could achieve a match victory by winning it. The Australian Open and French Open likewise adopted the seven-point tiebreaker in the early 1970s for all sets except the final set.

In 1979, Wimbledon changed their rules so that a seven-point tiebreak would be played once any set except the final set reached 6–6 in games.

In 1989, the Davis Cup adopted the tiebreak in all sets except for the final set, and then extended it to the final set starting in 2016.

In 2001, the Australian Open adopted the tiebreak at 6–6 in the final set in men's and women's doubles matches. The French Open followed in 2007.

In 2001, the Australian Open replaced the deciding third set of mixed doubles with a ten-point "match tiebreak" requiring a team to reach ten points and win by two points to wins the match. This is also referred to as an "18-point match tiebreak". Despite some criticism of the change by fans and former pros, the US Open (from 2001) and the French Open (from 2007) have followed the Australian Open in using the same format for mixed doubles. Wimbledon continues to play a traditional best-of-three match.

The ATP Tour introduced a match tiebreak format for doubles tournaments in 2006. The WTA Tour adopted that rule in 2007.

Tiebreak sets even for final sets are now universal in all levels of professional play. However, the details of final set tiebreak sets in Grand Slam tournaments were not uniform from 1970 to 2022. During most of this era, the US Open was the only major tournament to use a tiebreak in the final set for singles. After criticism of two lengthy semifinals in the 2018 Men's singles, Wimbledon announced the 2019 Championships would use final-set tiebreaks if the score reached 12–12. The first was in the Men's doubles third round, with Henri Kontinen and John Peers defeating Rajeev Ram and Joe Salisbury. Shortly following Wimbledon's final set tiebreak introduction announcement, the Australian Open introduced (for their 2019 tournament) a "super-tiebreak" at 6–6 for both singles and doubles (but not mixed doubles) in the final set, with the winner being the first to ten points instead of seven. Other significant tournaments also adopted a final set seven-point tiebreak during the same period: the Olympics in 2016, the Davis Cup in 2016, and the Fed Cup in 2019.

This led to each of the four grand slam events having four different final-set scoring systems, and at times also across singles and doubles. This ended in March 2022, when the ATP, WTA, and ITF announced that final-set tiebreaks in all Grand Slams matches (except mixed-doubles) will have a 10-point tiebreak when the set reaches six games all (6–6). The IOC still uses the seven-point tiebreak for the Olympics.

=== Alternative set scoring format ===
While traditional sets continue until a player wins at least six games by a margin of at least two games, there are some alternative set scoring formats.

A common alternative set format is the eight or nine game pro set, which is played until one player wins eight or nine games (instead of six) with a margin of two games. The tiebreak is therefore played at eight or nine games all. While this format is not used in modern professional matches or recognized by the ITF rules, it was supposedly used in early professional tours. It is commonly utilized in various amateur leagues and high school tennis as a shorter alternative to a best-of-three match, but longer than a traditional tiebreak set. In addition, eight-game pro sets were used during doubles for all Division I college dual matches until the 2014–2015 season.

Another alternative set format is the "short sets", which is played until one player wins four games with a margin of two games. In this format, a tiebreak is played at four games all. The ITF experimented with this format in low level Davis Cup matches, but the experiment was not continued. Nevertheless, this alternative remains as an acceptable alternative in the ITF rules of tennis.

Another alternative set format is seen in World TeamTennis, where the winner of a set is the first to win five games, and a 9-point tiebreak is played at 4–4.

== Match score ==
=== Description ===
The winner is the side that wins more than half of the sets, and the match ends as soon as this is achieved. Men's matches may be the best of either three or five sets, while women's and mixed doubles matches are usually best of three sets.

The alternation of service between games continues throughout the match without regard to sets, but the ends are changed after each odd game within a set (including the last game). If, for example, the second set of a match ends with the score at 6–3, 1–6, the ends are changed as the last game played was the 7th (odd) game of the set and in spite of it being the 16th (even) game of the match. Even when a set ends with an odd game, ends are again changed after the first game of the following set. A tiebreaker game is treated as a single game for the purposes of this alternation. Since tiebreakers always result in a score of 7–6, there is always a court change after the tiebreaker. That change would occur in the next set.

The score of a complete match may be given simply by sets won, or with the scores in each set given separately. In either case, the match winner's score is stated first. For example: in the former, shorter form, a match might be listed as 3–1 (i.e. three sets to one). In the latter form, this same match might be further described as "7–5, 6–7^{(4–7)}, 6–4, 7–6^{(8–6)}". (As noted above, an alternate form of writing the tiebreak score lists only the loser's score—e.g., "7–6^{(6)}" for the fourth set in the example.) This match was won three sets to one, with the match loser winning the second set on a tiebreaker. The numbers in parentheses, normally included in printed scorelines but omitted when spoken, indicate the score of the tiebreaker game in a set. Here, the match winner lost the second-set tiebreaker 4–7 and won the fourth-set tiebreaker 8–6.

=== Total points won ===
Because tennis is scored set by set and game by game, a player may lose a match despite winning the majority of points and/or games played.

Consider a player who wins six games in each of two sets, all by a score of game–30. The winner has scored 4×12 = 48 points and the loser 2×12 = 24. Suppose also that the loser wins four games in each set, all by a score of game–love. The loser has scored 4×8 = 32 points and the winner zero in those games. The final score is a win by 6–4, 6–4; total points 48–56.

An example of this in actual practice was the record-breaking Isner–Mahut match in the Wimbledon first round, 22–24 June 2010. American John Isner beat Nicolas Mahut of France (6–4, 3–6, 6–7^{(7–9)}, 7–6^{(7–3)}, 70–68) despite Mahut winning a total of 502 points to Isner's 478.

=== Total games won ===
Likewise, a player may lose a match despite winning the majority of games played (or win a match despite losing the majority of games). Roger Federer won the 2009 Wimbledon final over Andy Roddick (5–7, 7–6^{(8–6)}, 7–6^{(7–5)}, 3–6, 16–14) despite Roddick's winning more games (39, versus Federer's 38). Roger Federer lost the 2019 Wimbledon final, despite winning more games (and points) than Novak Djokovic.

== Announcing the score ==
When playing a match, it is usually best to report each score out loud with one's opponent to avoid conflicts. During a game, the server has the responsibility to announce the game score before serving. This is done by announcing the server's score first. If, for example, the server loses the first three points of the service game, the server would say "love–40". This is to be done every time.

After a set is complete, the server, before serving for the first game of the next set, announces the set scores so far completed in the match, stating their own scores first. If the server has won the first two sets and is beginning the third, the server would say, "two–love, new set". If the server had lost the first two sets, the server would say, "love–two, new set". After completing the match, either player, when asked the score, announces their own scores first.

=== Example ===
As an example, consider a match between Victoria Azarenka and Ana Ivanovic. Azarenka wins the first set 6–4, Ivanovic wins the next set 7–6 (winning the tiebreak 7–4), and Azarenka wins the final set 6–0.

At the end of each set, the umpire would announce the winner of each set:

Game, first set, Azarenka.
Game, second set, Ivanovic.

At the completion of the match, the result would be announced as:

Game, set, match, (Victoria) Azarenka, two sets to one, six–four, six–seven, six–love.

The result would be written as:

(Belarus) Victoria Azarenka defeated (Serbia) Ana Ivanovic 6–4, 6–7^{(4–7)}, 6–0

The score is always written and announced in respect to the winner of the match. The score of the tiebreak is not included in announcing the final result; it is simply said "seven–six" or "six–seven" regardless of the score in the tiebreak.

If a match ends prematurely due to one player retiring or being disqualified (defaulting), the partial score at that point is announced as the final score, with the remaining player as the nominal winner. For instance, the result in the final of the 2012 Aegon Championships was written and announced as follows:

(Croatia) Marin Čilić defeated (Argentina) David Nalbandian 6–7^{(3–7)}, 4–3 (default)
Code violation, unsportsmanlike conduct, default, Mr. (David) Nalbandian.

=== Variations and slang ===
During informal play of tennis, especially at tennis clubs in the U.S. (and other English-speaking countries), score announcements are frequently shortened with the use of abbreviations. For example, a score 15 is replaced with "five", or in some cases "fif". "Love" is often substituted to indicate "zero". Similarly, the scores of 30 and 40 may sometimes be spoken as "three" or "four" respectively. A score of 15–all may sometimes be announced as "fives". To further confuse score announcements, a score of 30–all (30–30) may often be called "deuce", and the following point referred to as "ad in" or "ad out" (or "my ad" or "your ad"), depending on which player (or team) won the point. The logic for this is that a 30–all score is effectively the same as deuce (40–40), in that one must win the next two points to win the game.

== Scorecards ==
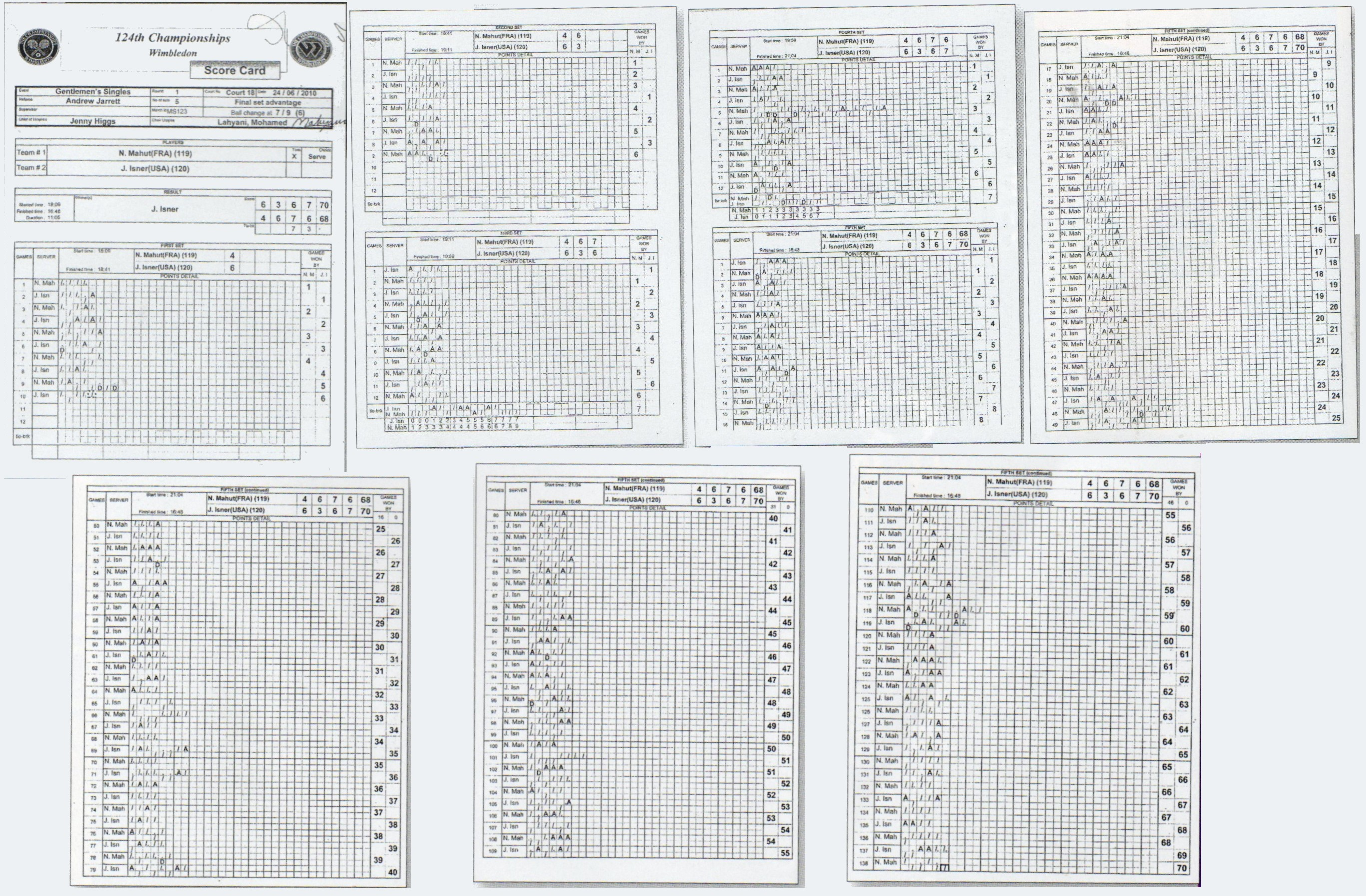
Sample scorecard, from Isner–Mahut at Wimbledon 2010

For formal scorekeeping, the official scoring the match (e.g., the chair umpire) fills out a scorecard, either on paper or electronically. The scorecard allows the official to record details for each point, as well as rule violations and other match information. Standard markings for each point are:

| / | – point won |
| A | – point won via ace |
| D | – point won via double-fault |
| C | – point won via code violation |
| T | – point won via time violation |

An additional dot is marked in a score box to indicate a missed first serve fault.
