= Ace (tennis) =

Point-winning serve untouched by the receiver

In tennis, an ace is a legal serve that is not touched by the receiver, winning the point for the server. In professional tennis, aces are generally seen on a player's first serve, where the server can strike the ball with maximum force and take more chances with ball placement, such as the far corners of the service box. According to the International Tennis Hall of Fame, this term was coined by the sports journalist Allison Danzig.

== Professional singles records ==
Aces have been officially recorded by the top-level professional tennis circuits since 1991, so these records start at that time.

Only main draw singles matches are included here.

Key
W	F	SF	QF	#R	RR	Q#	DNQ	A	NH

(W) winner; (F) finalist; (SF) semifinalist; (QF) quarterfinalist; (#R) rounds 4, 3, 2, 1; (RR) round-robin stage; (Q#) qualification round; (DNQ) did not qualify; (A) absent; (NH) not held; (SR) strike rate (events won / competed); (W–L) win–loss record.

=== ATP Tour ===
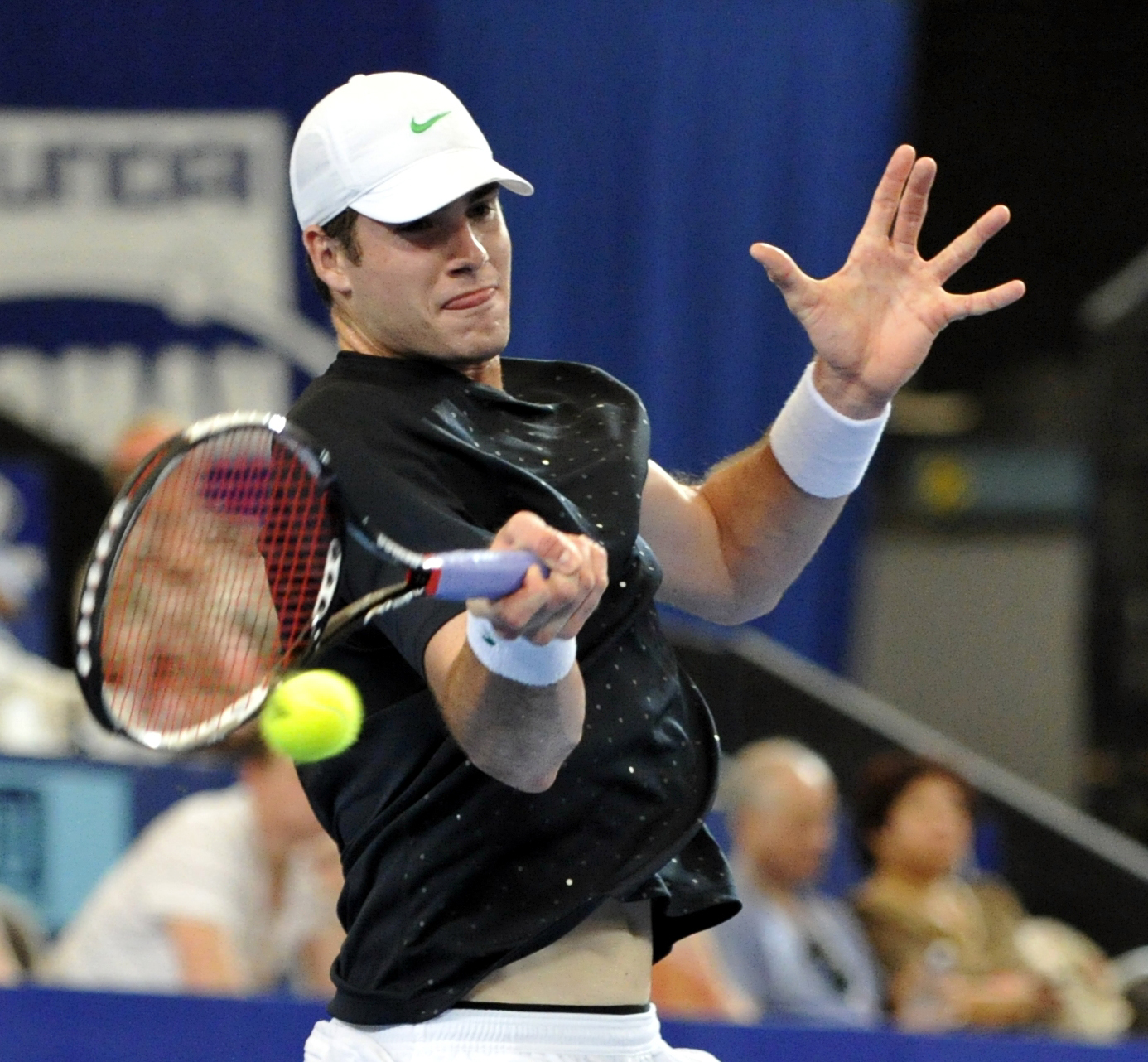
John Isner holds the professional records for most aces in a match Wimbledon 2010, an entire tournament Wimbledon 2018, and also first on the most aces in career list.

John Isner has the most aces in a tournament with 214 during the 2018 Wimbledon, and he has the most in a single match with 113 during his 11-hour encounter with Nicolas Mahut in 2010. John Isner has also served the most aces with 14,470.

Milos Raonic hit 47 aces in 2024 Queen's, the most in a best-of-three-set match. Ivo Karlović became the only player to hit at least 40 aces in three consecutive matches during 2015 Wimbledon.

Goran Ivanišević has the most in a single season with 1,477 in 1996. He also has the second most in a tournament with 213 when he won the 2001 Wimbledon title.

Roger Federer hit 50 aces in the 2009 Wimbledon final, the record for a Grand Slam final. He is also third on the career list.

==== Aces since 1991 ====
No.	Career aces
14,470	(United States) John Isner
13,728	(Croatia) Ivo Karlović
11,478	(Switzerland) Roger Federer
10,261	(Spain) Feliciano López
10,237	(Croatia) Goran Ivanišević
9,074	(United States) Andy Roddick
8,879	(United States) Sam Querrey
8,858	(United States) Pete Sampras
8,599	(Croatia) Marin Čilić
8,445	(Canada) Milos Raonic
Top 10

No.	Aces in a season	Year
1,477	(Croatia) Goran Ivanišević	1996
1,447	(Croatia) Ivo Karlović	2015
1,318	(Croatia) Ivo Karlović	2007
1,260	(United States) John Isner	2015
1,213	(United States) John Isner	2018
1,185	(Croatia) Ivo Karlović	2014
1,159	(United States) John Isner	2016
1,156	(Croatia) Goran Ivanišević	1994
1,131	(Croatia) Ivo Karlović	2016
1,123	(United States) John Isner	2017
Top 10

==== Top 10 most aces served in a match since 1991 ====
No.	Player	W/L	Opponent	Round	Event	Sets	Surface	Ref.
113	(United States) John Isner	W	(France) Nicolas Mahut	1R	2010 Wimbledon	5	Grass	
103	(France) Nicolas Mahut	L	(United States) John Isner	1R	2010 Wimbledon	5	Grass	
78	(Croatia) Ivo Karlović	L	(Czech Republic) Radek Štěpánek	SF	2009 Davis Cup	5	Clay	
75	(Croatia) Ivo Karlović	W	(Argentina) Horacio Zeballos	1R	2017 Australian Open	5	Hard	
67	(United States) Reilly Opelka	L	(Italy) Thomas Fabbiano	2R	2019 Australian Open	5	Hard	
64	(United States) John Isner	W	(Belgium) Ruben Bemelmans	2R	2018 Wimbledon	5	Grass	
61	(Croatia) Ivo Karlović	W	(Chinese Taipei) Lu Yen-Hsun	1R	2016 US Open	5	Hard	
61	(Croatia) Ivo Karlović	L	(Germany) Jan-Lennard Struff	2R	2018 Wimbledon	5	Grass	
59	(Croatia) Ivo Karlović	L	(Japan) Kei Nishikori	2R	2019 Australian Open	5	Hard	
56	(France) Albano Olivetti	L	(Australia) Matthew Barton	1R	2016 Wimbledon	5	Grass	

==== Most aces in a US Open match since 1991 ====
No.	Player	W/L	Opponent	Round	Event	Surface	Ref.
61	(Croatia) Ivo Karlović	W	(Chinese Taipei) Lu Yen-hsun	1R	2016 US Open	Hard	
52	(United States) John Isner	L	(United States) Steve Johnson	1R	2020 US Open	Hard	
49	(Netherlands) Richard Krajicek	L	(Russia) Yevgeny Kafelnikov	QF	1999 US Open	Hard	
49	(South Africa) Kevin Anderson	W	(Czech Republic) Jiří Veselý	1R	2021 US Open	Hard	
48	(Kazakhstan) Alexander Bublik	W	(Italy) Thomas Fabbiano	2R	2019 US Open	Hard	
48	(United States) John Isner	L	(United States) Michael Mmoh	2R	2023 US Open	Hard	

==== Most aces in a clay-court tournament since 1991 ====
Note: This marked the third time that Isner had hit 100+ aces in a clay-court tournament.

No.	Player	Event	Surface	Ref.
124	(Netherlands) Martin Verkerk	2003 French Open	Clay	
110	(United States) John Isner	2014 French Open	Clay	
108	(Germany) Michael Stich	1996 French Open	Clay	
107	(United States) John Isner	2021 Madrid Open	Clay	
101	(United States) John Isner	2017 Rome	Clay	

==== Most aces in a one-week tournament since 1991 ====
No.	Player	Event	Surface	Ref.
156	(United States) Reilly Opelka	2019 New York Open	Hard	
144	(United States) John Isner	2007 Legg Mason Tennis Classic	Hard	

==== Most aces served in a three-set match since 1991 ====
No.	Player	W/L	Opponent	Round	Event	Surface	Ref.
47	(Canada) Milos Raonic	W	(United Kingdom) Cameron Norrie	1R	2024 Queen's	Grass	
45	(Croatia) Ivo Karlović	W	(Czech Republic) Tomáš Berdych	QF	2015 Halle	Grass	
44	(Australia) Mark Philippoussis	W	(Zimbabwe) Byron Black	2R	1995 Kuala Lumpur	Carpet (i)	
44	(Croatia) Ivo Karlović	W	(Germany) Daniel Brands	1R	2014 Zagreb	Hard (i)	
44	(Australia) Nick Kyrgios	W	(United States) Ryan Harrison	1R	2019 Brisbane	Hard	
44	(United States) Ben Shelton	W	(United States) Aleksandar Kovacevic	1R	2026 Basel	Hard	
44	(United States) John Isner	L	(China) Wu Yibing	F	2023 Dallas Open	Hard	
44	(United States) Reilly Opelka	L	(Poland) Kamil Majchrzak	2R	2026 Brisbane	Hard	
43	(United States) Mardy Fish	L	(Belgium) Olivier Rochus	2R	2007 Lyon	Hard	
43	(United States) Reilly Opelka	W	(United States) John Isner	SF	2019 New York	Hard	
43	(United States) Reilly Opelka	W	(Canada) Brayden Schnur	F	2019 New York	Hard	
40	(Croatia) Goran Ivanišević	W	(Sweden) Magnus Norman	1R	1997 Zagreb	Carpet (i)	

==== Most combined aces in a three-set match since 1991 ====
No.	Player	W/L	Opponent	Round	Event	Surface	Ref.
81	(United States) Reilly Opelka	W	(United States) John Isner	SF	2019 New York	Hard	
71	(Australia) Nick Kyrgios	W	(United States) Ryan Harrison	1R	2019 Brisbane	Hard	

==== Most consecutive aces since 1991 ====
No.	Player	W/L	Opponent	Round	Event	Surface	Ref.
10	(United States) Sam Querrey	W	(United States) James Blake	QF	2007 Indianapolis	Hard	
8	(Czech Republic) Radek Štěpánek	W	(Belgium) Christophe Rochus	F	2006 Rotterdam	Hard (i)	
7	(Germany) Michael Stich	W	(France) Guy Forget	SF	1993 Hopman Cup	Hard	
7	(United States) Andy Roddick	W	(Netherlands) Sjeng Schalken	QF	2003 US Open	Hard	
7	(United States) Andy Roddick	L	(Australia) Lleyton Hewitt	SF	2005 Australian Open	Hard	
7	(Chile) Fernando González	W	(Sweden) Joachim Johansson	3R	2005 Wimbledon	Grass	
7	(Spain) Feliciano López	L	(Czech Republic) Tomáš Berdych	2R	2013 Shanghai	Hard	
7	(Croatia) Ivo Karlović	W	(Russia) Mikhail Youzhny	1R	2014 Halle	Grass	
7	(Switzerland) Roger Federer	W	(Australia) James Duckworth	QF	2015 Brisbane	Hard	
7	(United States) Sam Querrey	W	(Italy) Thomas Fabbiano	SF	2019 Eastbourne	Grass	
7	(Denmark) Holger Rune	W	(United States) Mackenzie McDonald	2R	2025 Queens	Grass	

==== Serving five consecutive aces from 0–40 down since 1991 ====
Player	W/L	Opponent	Round	Event	Surface	Ref.
(Germany) Boris Becker	W	(Ukraine) Andriy Medvedev	F	1995 Hopman Cup	Hard	
(United States) John Isner	L	(France) Édouard Roger-Vasselin	SF	2013 Delray Beach	Hard	
(United States) John Isner	W	(Czech Republic) Jiří Veselý	3R	2015 US Open	Hard	
(United States) Reilly Opelka	W	(Spain) Roberto Bautista Agut	QF	2019 Basel	Hard (i)	

==== Most aces without a double fault since 1991 ====
No.	Player	W/L	Opponent	Round	Event	Surface	Ref.
49	(United States) John Isner	W	(Australia) Bernard Tomic	1R	2016 Davis Cup	Grass	
39	(United States) Reilly Opelka	W	(United States) John Isner	SF	2022 Dallas Open	Hard	
37	(United States) John Isner	W	(Poland) Jerzy Janowicz	1R	2016 Australian Open	Hard	
34	(Croatia) Ivo Karlović	W	(Chile) Nicolás Massú	1R	2007 Stockholm	Hard (i)	
33	(United States) Andy Roddick	W	(Chile) Fernando González	4R	2010 Australian Open	Hard	
31	(Russia) Marat Safin	W	(United States) Andre Agassi	SF	2004 Australian Open	Hard	

==== Seasons since 1991 with 1000+ aces ====
No.	Player	Years	Ref.
7	(United States) John Isner	2010, 12, 15–19	
4	(Croatia) Goran Ivanišević	1994, 96–98	
4	(Croatia) Ivo Karlović	2007, 14–16	
2	(Canada) Milos Raonic	2012, 14	
2	(South Africa) Kevin Anderson	2015, 18	
1	(United States) Pete Sampras	1993	
1	(United States) Andy Roddick	2004	
1	(United States) Reilly Opelka	2019	
1	(Poland) Hubert Hurkacz	2023	

==== Most seasons since 1991 finished as ace leader ====
No.	Player	Years
8	(United States) John Isner	2010, 12–13, 16–19, 22
6	(Croatia) Goran Ivanišević	1992, 94, 96–98, 2001
5	(Croatia) Ivo Karlović	2007–09, 14–15
3	(United States) Andy Roddick	2003–05
2	(United States) Pete Sampras	1993, 95
1	(France) Guy Forget	1991
1	(Netherlands) Richard Krajicek	1999
1	(Russia) Marat Safin	2000
1	(Australia) Wayne Arthurs	2002
1	(Croatia) Ivan Ljubičić	2006
1	(France) Jo-Wilfried Tsonga	2011
1	(Canada) Milos Raonic	2020
1	(Kazakhstan) Alexander Bublik	2021
1	(Poland) Hubert Hurkacz	2023
1	(Germany) Alexander Zverev	2024
1	(United States) Taylor Fritz	2025

=== WTA Tour ===
Serena Williams holds the record for most aces in a tournament with 102 en route to winning the 2012 Wimbledon title.

=== Most aces ===
- since 2010

No.	Career aces
4,116	(Czech Republic) Karolina Pliskova
3,056	(United States) Serena Williams
2,880	(France) Caroline Garcia
2,802	(Czech Republic) Petra Kvitova
2,762	(Kazakhstan) Elena Rybakina
2,692	(Germany) Julia Goerges
2,589	(United States) Madison Keys
2,188	(Belarus) Aryna Sabalenka
2,090	(Australia) Samantha Stosur
1,987	(Russia) Ekaterina Alexandrova
Top 10

No.	Aces in a season	Year
530	(Czech Republic) Karolina Pliskova	2016
517	(Czech Republic) Karolina Pliskova (2)	2015
516	(Kazakhstan) Elena Rybakina	2025
498	(United States) Serena Williams	2015
492	(Germany) Julia Goerges	2018
488	(Czech Republic) Karolina Pliskova (3)	2019
484	(United States) Serena Williams (2)	2012
480	(United States) Serena Williams (3)	2013
462	(France) Caroline Garcia	2023
457	(Netherlands) Kiki Bertens	2019
Top 10

==== Most aces in a match ====
Players who have served 20 or more aces in a match since 2008 listed below.

No.	Player	W/L	Opponent	Round	Event	Sets	Surface	Ref.
31	(Czech Republic) Kristýna Plíšková	L	(Puerto Rico) Monica Puig	2R	2016 Australian Open	3	Hard	
29	(Canada) Rebecca Marino	L	(Australia) Talia Gibson	QF	2025 Tokyo	3	Hard	
28	(Czech Republic) Kristýna Plíšková	L	(Puerto Rico) Monica Puig	2R	2019 Luxembourg	3	Hard (i)	
28	(Denmark) Clara Tauson	L	(Australia) Talia Gibson	3R	2026 Indian Wells	3	Hard	
27	(Germany) Sabine Lisicki	W	(Switzerland) Belinda Bencic	2R	2015 Birmingham	2	Grass	
27	(France) Caroline Garcia	L	(China) Zhang Shuai	2R	2022 Tokyo	3	Hard	
26	(Canada) Rebecca Marino	L	(Russia) Kamilla Rakhimova	QR2	2025 Cincinnati	3	Hard	
24	(Estonia) Kaia Kanepi	W	(Czech Republic) Lucie Šafářová	1R	2008 Tokyo	3	Hard	
24	(United States) Serena Williams	W	(Belarus) Victoria Azarenka	SF	2012 Wimbledon	2	Grass	
24	(Czech Republic) Kristýna Plíšková	W	(Czech Republic) Karolína Plíšková	2R	2019 Birmingham	3	Grass	
24	(Czech Republic) Karolína Plíšková	W	(United States) Amanda Anisimova	2R	2021 US Open	3	Hard	
24	(Canada) Rebecca Marino	L	(France) Caroline Garcia	2R	2022 Guadalajara Open Akron	3	Hard	
23	(United States) Serena Williams	W	(China) Zheng Jie	3R	2012 Wimbledon	3	Grass	
23	(Czech Republic) Kristýna Plíšková	L	(France) Océane Dodin	1R	2016 Linz	3	Hard (i)	
23	(China) Zheng Qinwen	W	(Japan) Naomi Osaka	1R	2024 Berlin	3	Grass	
23	(New Zealand) Lulu Sun	L	(France) Océane Dodin	QR2	2026 Wimbledon	2	Grass	
22	(Netherlands) Brenda Schultz	W	(Croatia) Iva Majoli	QF	1994 Birmingham	3	Grass	
22	(United States) Meghann Shaughnessy	L	(Czech Republic) Nicole Vaidišová	F	2005 Memphis	2	Hard (i)	
22	(Australia) Alicia Molik	L	(United States) Venus Williams	QF	2007 Tokyo	2	Hard	
22	(Russia) Ekaterina Alexandrova	W	(United States) Kristie Ahn	QF	2019 Seoul	3	Hard	
22	(Belgium) Alison Van Uytvanck	L	(United States) Sofia Kenin	SF	2020 Lyon	3	Hard	
22	(Denmark) Clara Tauson	L	(United States) Sofia Kenin	2R	2024 Toray	3	Hard	
22	(Canada) Rebecca Marino	W	(Japan) Ayano Shimizu	1R	2025 Tokyo	3	Hard	

Note: in the match between Lulu Sun and Océane Dodin, each player also hit an additional ace in the first set tie-break which was not included in the match statistics.

==== Most seasons finished as ace leader ====
Note: Most aces served in a season since 2010.

No.	Player	Years
5	(Czech Republic) Karolína Plíšková	2015–17, 19, 21
3	(United States) Serena Williams	2012–14
2	(France) Caroline Garcia	2022–23
2	(Kazakhstan) Elena Rybakina	2020, 25
1	(Russia) Nadia Petrova	2010
1	(France) Marion Bartoli	2011
1	(Germany) Julia Görges	2018
1	(China) Zheng Qinwen	2024

==== Seasons with 500+ aces ====
Karolína Plíšková has the most aces in a single season with 530 in 2016, which broke her own record of 517 in 2015. She has also served the most aces in a match on clay, with 21 in her second round victory over Jeļena Ostapenko at Stuttgart in 2021.

No.	Player	Years	Ref.
2	(Czech Republic) Karolína Plíšková	2015–2016	
1	(Kazakhstan) Elena Rybakina	2025	

==== Most aces in WTA 1000s in a season ====
Elena Rybakina has served the most aces in WTA 1000 events in a season with 235 in 2023, the most since 2009. Followed by Karolína Plíšková with 234 and Serena Williams with 233.

== Half-ace ==
In 1999, the Swedish artist and writer Kjell Höglund proposed a term for when an opponent manages to hit the ball without it actually entering into play. He suggested it should be called a "half-ace".

== See also ==
- ATP Tour records
- Fastest recorded tennis serves
- Glossary of tennis terms
- Tennis shots
