= Serve (tennis) =

Initial shot to start a point

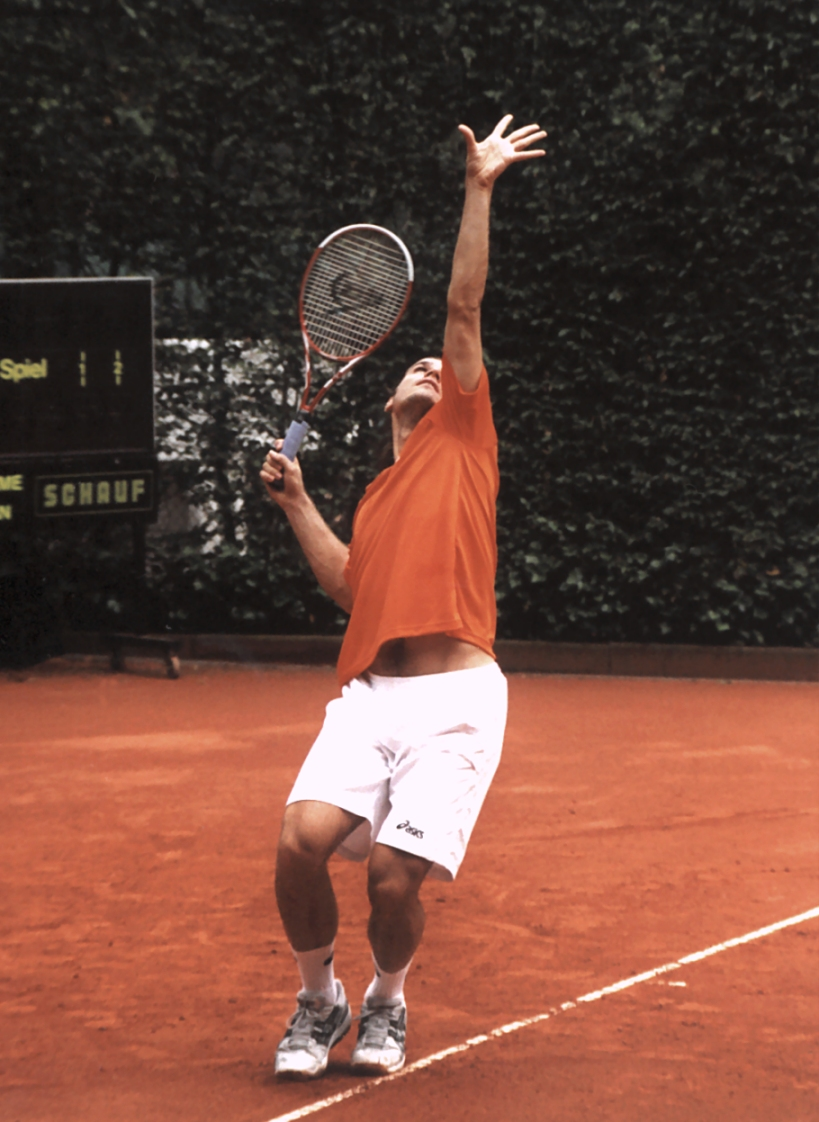
Tommy Haas serving

A serve (or, more formally, a service) in tennis is a shot to start a point. A player will hit the ball with a racquet so it will fall into the diagonally opposite service box without being stopped by the net and faulted. Normally players begin a serve by tossing the ball into the air and hitting it (usually near the highest point of the toss). The ball can only touch the net on a return and will be considered good if it falls on the opposite side. If the ball contacts the net on the serve but then proceeds to the proper service box, it is called a let; this is not a legal serve in the major tours (but see below) although it is also not a fault. Players normally serve overhead; however serving underhand is allowed. The serve is the only shot a player can take their time to set up instead of having to react to an opponent's shot; however, as of 2012, there is a 25-second limit to be allowed between points.

The serve is one of the most difficult shots for a novice, but once mastered it can be a considerable advantage. Advanced players can hit the serve in many different ways and often use it as an offensive weapon to gain an advantage in the point or to win it outright. Because of this, players above beginner level are expected to win most of their service games, and the ability to break an opponent's serve plays a crucial role in a match.

For any serve, the server stands behind the baseline without touching it. For the first point of any game, the server stands to the right of the center point of the baseline and serves diagonally across the net to the left side (from the server's perspective) of the court, into the service box which extends to the service line about midway into the opponent's court. For the second point of the game, the serve is diagonally from the left to the right side of the court, and for each subsequent point of the same game the positioning is the opposite of that on the previous point.

== Rules ==
An attempt at a serve may result in one of the following outcomes:

- an ace
- a good serve
- a let
- a fault
- (very rarely) immediate award of the point to the server.

=== Ace ===
An ace occurs when a legally delivered ball lands in the cross-court service box or on any line bounding it without touching anything in flight and further missing contact from the receiver. This prompts the server to receive the point once the ball reaches its second bounce. This outcome usually occurs on the first serve, where players are able to take a higher risk and hit a flat and fast ball. This is because, if a player misses the first serve, they have committed an initial fault, but they have not lost the point. As long as they make the second serve which is slower and has a higher percentage of accuracy, they are still in the point.

=== Good ===
A good serve occurs when a legally delivered ball lands in the cross-court service box or on any line bounding it without touching anything in flight. Once a good serve is hit, the play begins.

=== Let ===
A let occurs when a legally served ball lands in the cross-court service box having touched the net cord (but not the net post or any other object). In professional tennis, play stops immediately, and the serve must be redone. The umpire (or opposing player when there is no umpire) will usually say "let" or "net" to signal to the server a let has occurred. However, in 1997 NCAA tennis rules were modified to play all lets.

=== Fault ===
There are multiple reasons why a service attempt may result in a fault.

- If the ball fails to clear the net, or bounces anywhere other than the cross-court service box, it is a fault. This is the most common cause of a fault.
- A foot fault takes place when the server assumes an illegal position while serving. The server's feet may touch only the ground behind the baseline, between the extensions of the center line and the sideline. The server's feet must not touch the baseline or the extension of the center line or sideline at any time before the ball is struck. The server is also required to stay roughly on the same position to prevent the opponent from being misled as to where the serve will originate. Running or walking while serving is not allowed, however jumping is permitted.
- Illegal release of the ball. The server must release the ball from one hand (exceptions are made for one-handed players, who may use the racket to release the ball).
- A miss. If the server swings but misses the ball, it is a fault. However, if a server releases the ball but does not attempt to hit it, there is no fault and the server may repeat the service attempt.
- If the ball, before bouncing, hits any object other than the net cord, the opponent's racket or body, it is a fault. For example, if the ball hits the net post and then bounces into the correct court, the service is still a fault.

After a fault, play stops immediately. If there has been only one fault on this point, the server is then allowed another attempt. If there have been two faults on this point, the point is awarded to the receiver: this is known as a double fault.

=== Award of point to the server ===
On a service, the receiver is required to allow the ball to bounce before attempting to hit it. In the extremely rare event of the receiver's racket or body touching a legally delivered ball before it bounces, the point is immediately awarded to the server. If the ball had already touched the net, then a let is called.

== First and second ==
A serve is made when there has been no fault on the point; a second serve occurs when there has already been one fault on the point. On a second serve, the server is in danger of losing the point if there is another fault.

The rules make no distinction between the first and second serve. However, the tactics used are different. The first serve is typically struck with the maximum power, skill, and deception the player is capable of with the aim of winning the point either outright or on the next stroke, by forcing the receiver into a disadvantageous position. The second serve is usually more conservative to avoid getting a double fault and is typically hit with less power or a higher curve. The second serves often have more topspin and kick on the ball.

== Stances ==
There are two popular stances in the tennis serve: the platform stance and the pinpoint stance.

In the platform stance, the feet are kept about shoulder-width apart throughout the service, providing stable support and easy weight transfer from the back to the front foot. The hips rotate, and sometimes the back foot swings forward to complete the hip rotation.

In the pinpoint stance, the feet start apart, but as the serve unfolds, the back foot slides or steps forward until it is adjacent to or slightly behind the front foot. As a result, the feet provide a very small base of support and balance may be a problem.

=== Advantages of platform stance and the pinpoint stance ===
The pinpoint serve provides better velocity, since the feet come together as a single unit, allowing them to push harder against the ground and gain more leg power. However, the center of gravity moves more than in the platform stance, so the player must have good body control in order to contact the ball consistently.

The service each player uses will depend on their individual abilities and what they need the most—power or consistency. If they already have good body control but would like to produce extra power, they could try the pinpoint stance. If consistency is their problem, they can use the platform stance.

=== Alternative stances ===
The platform stance and the pinpoint stance are closed stances. For a very long time, the use of an open stance to serve had been regarded as a sign of a tennis beginner. Things have changed in recent years. At the elite level, Venus Williams had used a semi-open stance to serve in the past (she went back to use a traditional closed stance and stayed to the old way currently). Beside Venus, Nikola Mektic and Viktor Troicki both have abandoned closed stance to use open stance to serve.

== Types ==
In the game of tennis, there are four commonly used serves: the "flat serve", the "slice serve", the "kick serve", and the "underhand serve". All of these serves are legal in professional and amateur play.

The term kick serve is ambiguous. It may be used as a synonym for the twist serve or the American twist. However, kick serve is commonly used to refer to any serve with heavy topspin or kick on it.

Servers can gain a tactical advantage by varying the type of serve and the ball's placement. The flat serve and slice serve are used primarily as first serves because they are more likely to yield an ace or force an error, although they require high accuracy. Second serves usually have slice, topspin or kick on them, which makes them less likely to land in the net or out of bounds. Kick serves also make a good change-up as a first serve.

=== Flat ===
A flat serve is hit with either a continental grip (holding the racket as if it were an axe), an Eastern backhand grip, or somewhere in between. The swing path goes directly toward the target at impact, which causes the ball to cut quickly through the air without spinning. Some professional players can hit flat serves at speeds near 150 miles per hour (240 km/h).

A flat serve must come close to the net therefore having a small margin for error. Therefore, flat serves are usually hit straight across the center, where the net is lowest. They are usually delivered as first serves, when the server does not risk a double fault. The ball is thrown straight above and slightly forward for the optimal serving point.

=== Slice/reverse slice ===
A slice serve is hit with a sidespin, which requires the server to brush the back of the ball toward their dominant side with the racket. It is commonly hit with the Continental grip or the Eastern backhand grip (using the forehand face of the racket). The ball is thrown slightly to the dominant side of the server then is struck laterally on the server's dominant side.

For a right-handed player, a sliced serve's sidespin causes the ball to curve leftward. When the ball bounces, it skids and curves farther leftward. The curve of a good slice serve can draw the receiver 10 feet (3.0 m) wide of the singles sideline to play the ball. Since a slice serve has little or no topspin on it, it cannot be aimed high over the net and has little margin for error. Therefore, it is generally used as a first serve. It can be used to ace the receiver, to draw the receiver out of position, or to "jam" the receiver with a serve curving sharply towards the receiver's body.

The reverse slice serve (or inside-out serve) is analogous to the screwball pitch in baseball. It is hit with the opposite spin of the slice serve. Servers must pronate their racket arm and sweep the racket across the body while striking the ball when hitting a reverse slice serve. Because the direction of spin applied is reversed relative to the standard slice serve, a reverse slice serve from a right-handed player will have the same motion as a slice serve from a left-handed player, and vice versa.

In professional and amateur tennis, the reverse slice serve is rarely used except as a novelty. As the word reverse is defined, one must hit opposite to the side and opposite to the path of the slice struck serve.

=== Kick/topspin/American twist/Reverse kick ===
Holcombe Ward and Dwight Davis introduced the kick/American twist serve in the late 1800s. The kick (or topspin) serve is generated by tossing the ball over the head, then hitting it laterally on the server's non-dominant side brushing upward toward the dominant side. When hit correctly, the ball clears the net in a high arc with heavy topspin, causing the ball to dive into the service box. Upon hitting the surface of the court, the ball may bounce high directly toward the receiver for a kick serve, or to the left for the receiver for an American twist serve. The physics of the spinning ball in flight involves the Magnus effect because the spinning ball creates a whirlpool of air around itself. The twist serve is a more extreme version of the kick serve, which involves more brushing of the ball from the 7–8 o'clock position to the 1–2 o'clock position, and faster swing speeds. If performed exceptionally, it can completely change the direction of the ball movement away from the other player, although this requires a very strong and flexible back.

Kick/topspin serves are often used as both first and second serves. As a first serve, a player will put more pace on the ball, while it is a consistent second serve since the spin brings it into the service box with high net clearance.

The reverse kick/American twist serve is rarely used except as a novelty. As the word "reverse" is defined, one must hit opposite to the side and opposite to the path of the kick struck serve.

=== Underhand ===
The underhand serve is struck below shoulder level. In the early days of tennis the underhand serve was the standard serve method, merely intended to start the game. In children's tennis, young children may be encouraged to use the underhand serve on 36 feet (11 m) courts. Although this serve is legal, it may be seen as unsportsmanlike in adult tennis. Some notable examples include Michael Chang's in the Round of 16 at the 1989 French Open against Ivan Lendl, and Martina Hingis was booed by the crowd for hitting one at the 1999 French Open. This serve has gained some prominence since 2019 as a surprise tactic when playing deep returners, heralded by Nick Kyrgios and Alexander Bublik.

=== Pat-a-cake ===
A pat-a-cake serve is a serve in which the racket is not swung behind the head (as in a proper serve). The player will simply toss the ball up and "pat" or tap it over the net to get it in play. It is often used by beginning players, or players who never had proper instruction. The term is usually employed belittlingly.

== Terminology ==
- Ace – a serve that lands in the service box and is then untouched by the opponent.
- Break – server losing his or her game.
- Break point – one point away from a break.
- Challenge – when either player disputes whether the ball landed in or out. A line judge may overturn a call made, or in professional settings, a review of the play may be made. Players are allowed a certain number of challenges per match.
- Double fault – hitting a fault on the second service. The server loses the point.
- Fault – an unsuccessful serve that does not start the point because the ball does not land in the opponent's designated service box; or, the server commits a foot fault (see below). This includes if the ball hits the net cord and lands outside the service box (when landing in the service box would’ve made it a let)
- Foot fault – a fault caused by the server stepping on or across his base line or the center line before striking the ball with his racquet.
- Hold – server winning the game.
- Let – a serve is called a let when the ball hits the net cord but still lands in the service court. Such a serve is not considered a fault and the server may repeat the service attempt.
- On serve – both players have held each of their service games in the set or had an equal number of service breaks in the set, putting them "back on serve".
- Service winner – a serve that is touched by the opponent, but not returned.

== Serve-record holders ==
Men

Player	Record held
(United States) John Isner	Most aces in a career
(Croatia) Goran Ivanišević	Most aces in a season
(United States) Pete Sampras (Note: Pete Sampras is considered by many to have the greatest serve in the history of men's tennis.)	First player to record 1000 aces in a season
(United States) John Isner	Most aces in a match
(Switzerland) Roger Federer	Most aces in a Grand Slam final
(Australia) Sam Groth	Fastest serve of all time
(United States) Andy Roddick	Fastest serve at a Grand Slam

Women

Player	Record held
(Czech Republic) Karolína Plíšková	Most aces in a season
(United States) Serena Williams (Note: Serena Williams is widely considered to have the greatest serve in the history of women's tennis.)	Most aces at a Grand Slam
(Czech Republic) Kristýna Plíšková	Most aces in a match
(Spain) Georgina García Pérez	Fastest serve on the women's tour

== Returning ==
Since the server has the advantage of being the initial aggressor, for his opponent to return the ball and to keep it in play often involves the defensive endeavor of minimizing the opponent's advantage. This may involve simply lunging to get the racket on the ball before it passes. If a controlled return of service is possible, a hard groundstroke to one side or the other of the opponent's baseline may be performed. If the server rushes the net immediately upon hitting the serve, the returner has several options: return the ball at the feet of the server not far past the net, forcing him to hit a half volley (which is hard to do aggressively); lob the ball over the rushing server's head; or hit a passing shot hard and low over the net too far to the left or right for the server to hit it.

== Gallery ==
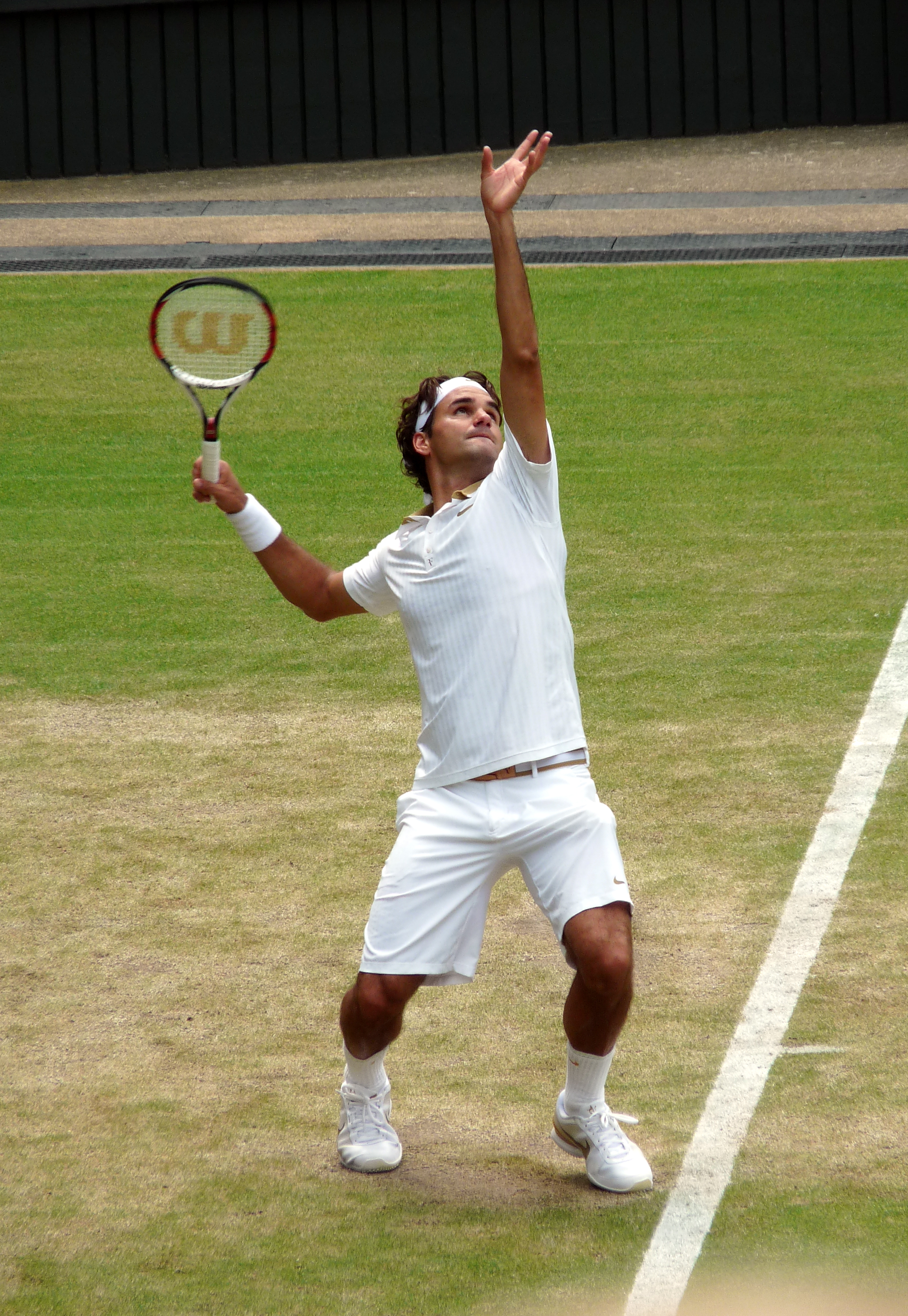
Roger Federer serving at the 2009 Wimbledon Championships.

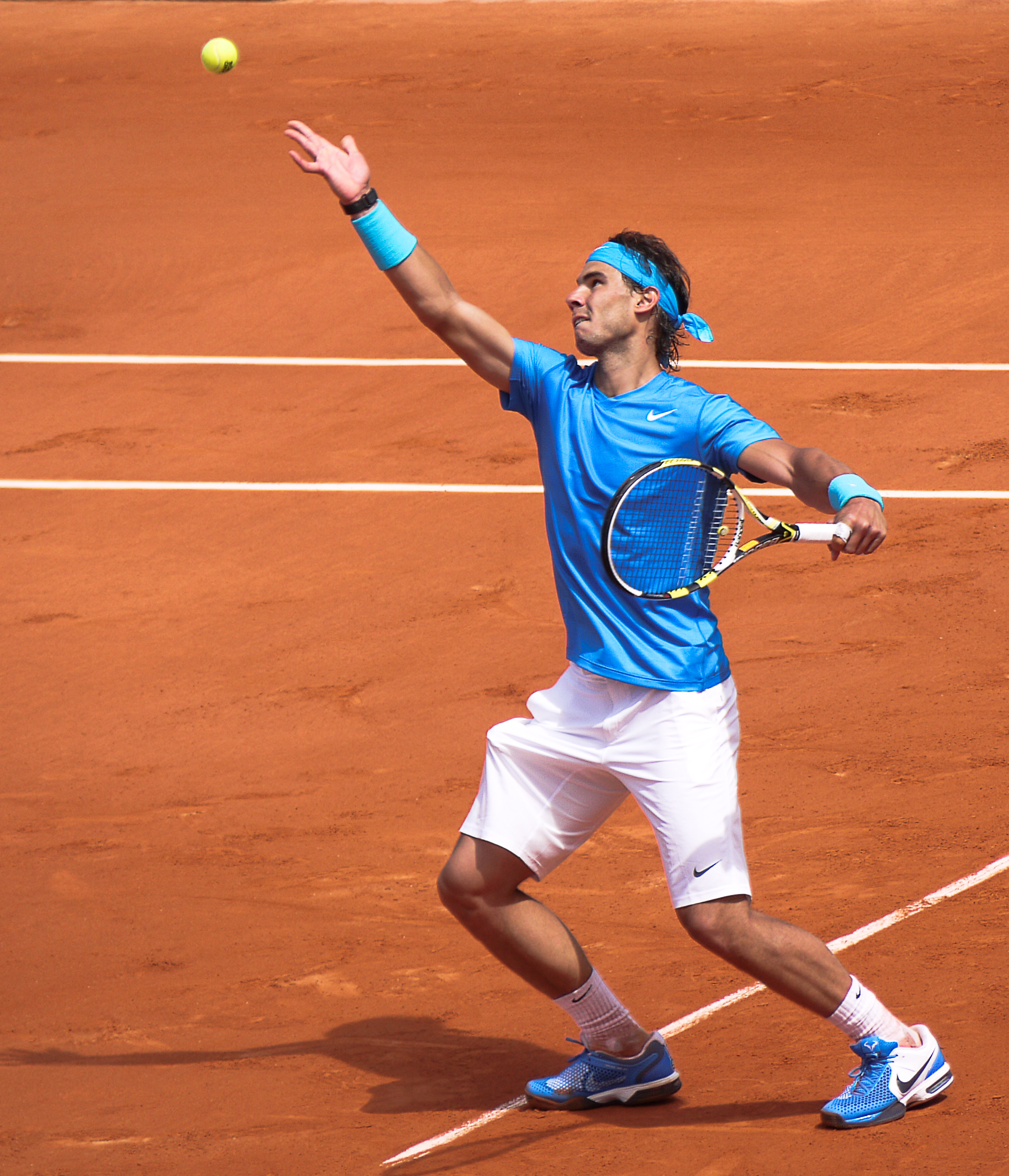
Rafael Nadal serving at the 2011 French Open.

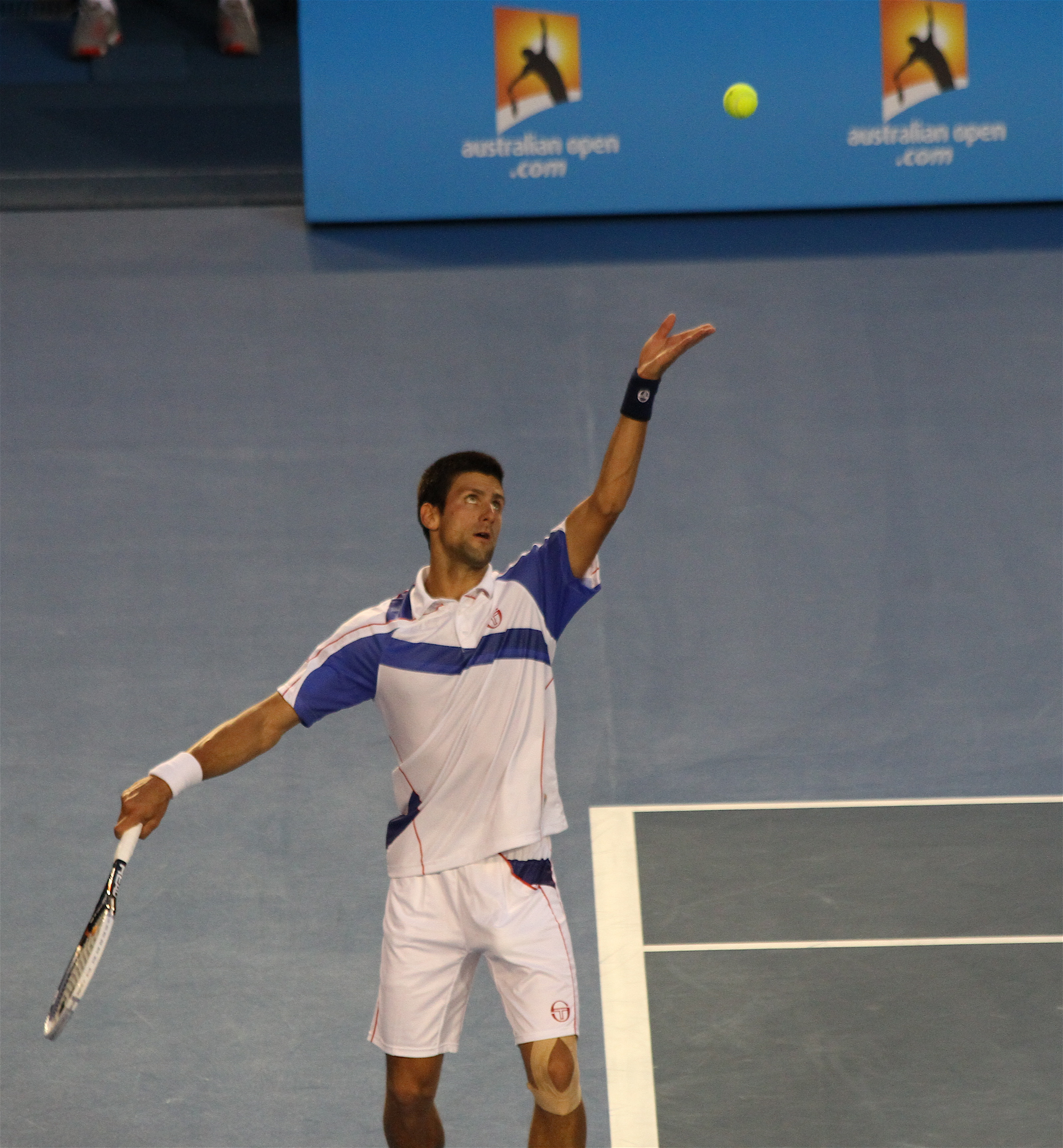
Novak Djokovic serving at the 2011 Australian Open.

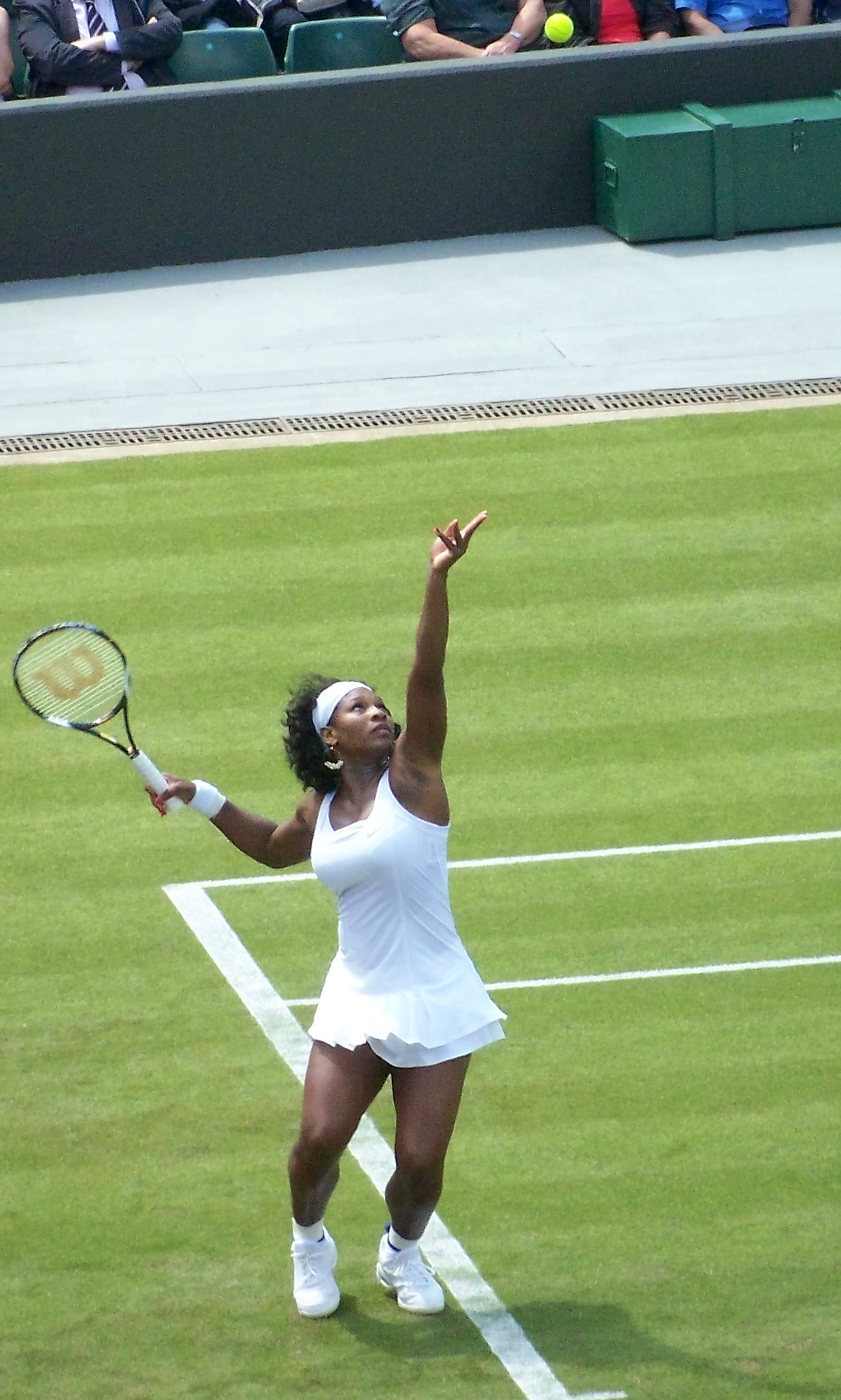
Serena Williams serving at the 2008 Wimbledon Championships.

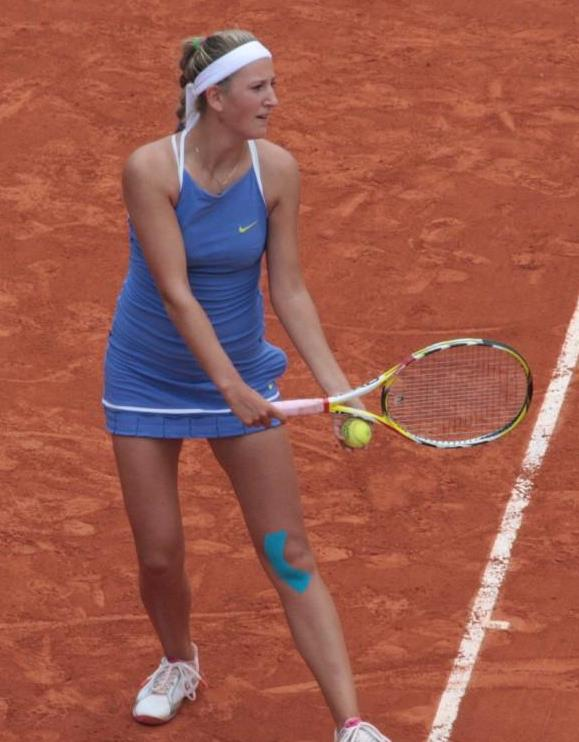
Victoria Azarenka prepares to serve at the 2009 French Open.

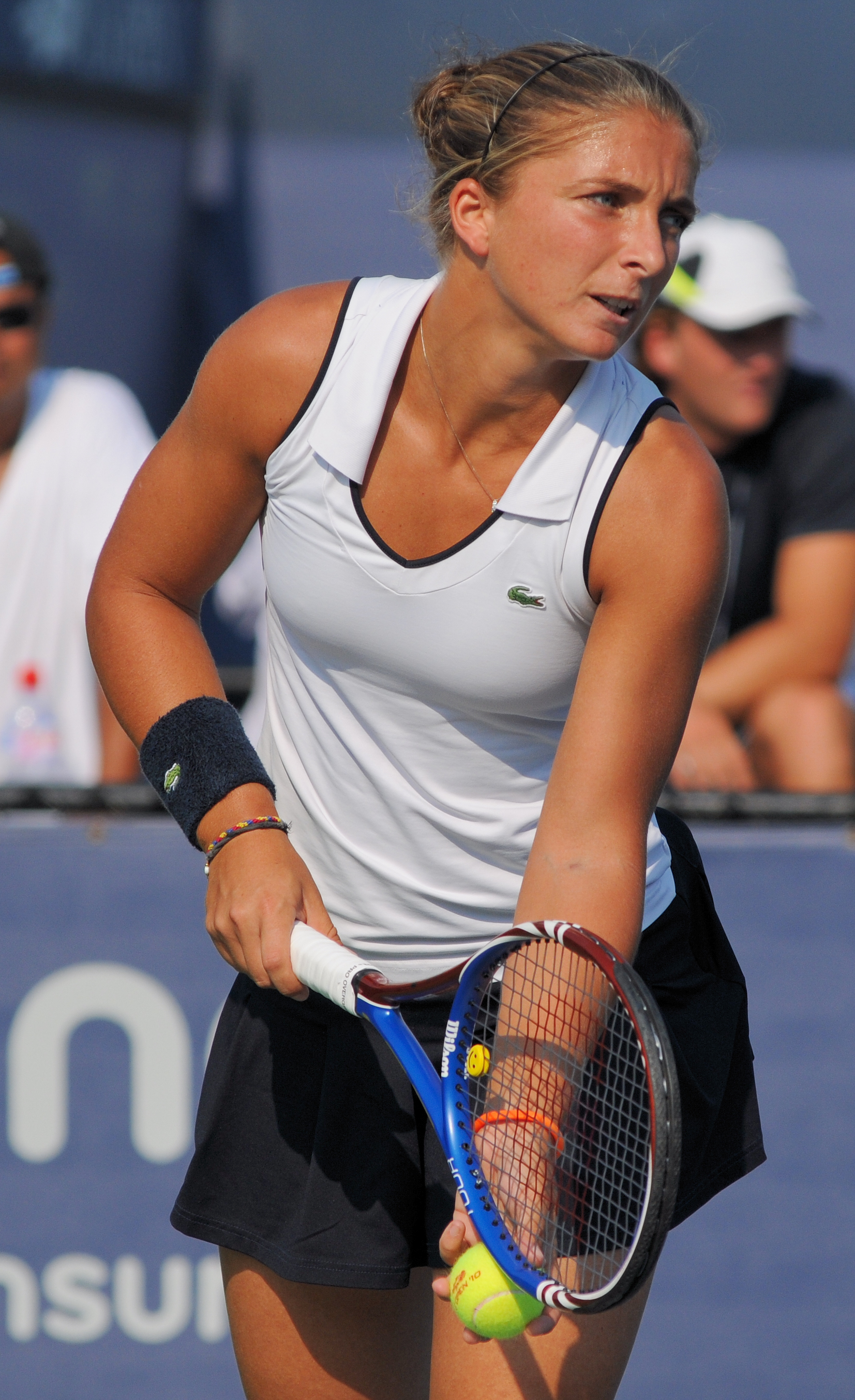
Sara Errani prepares to serve at the 2010 US Open.

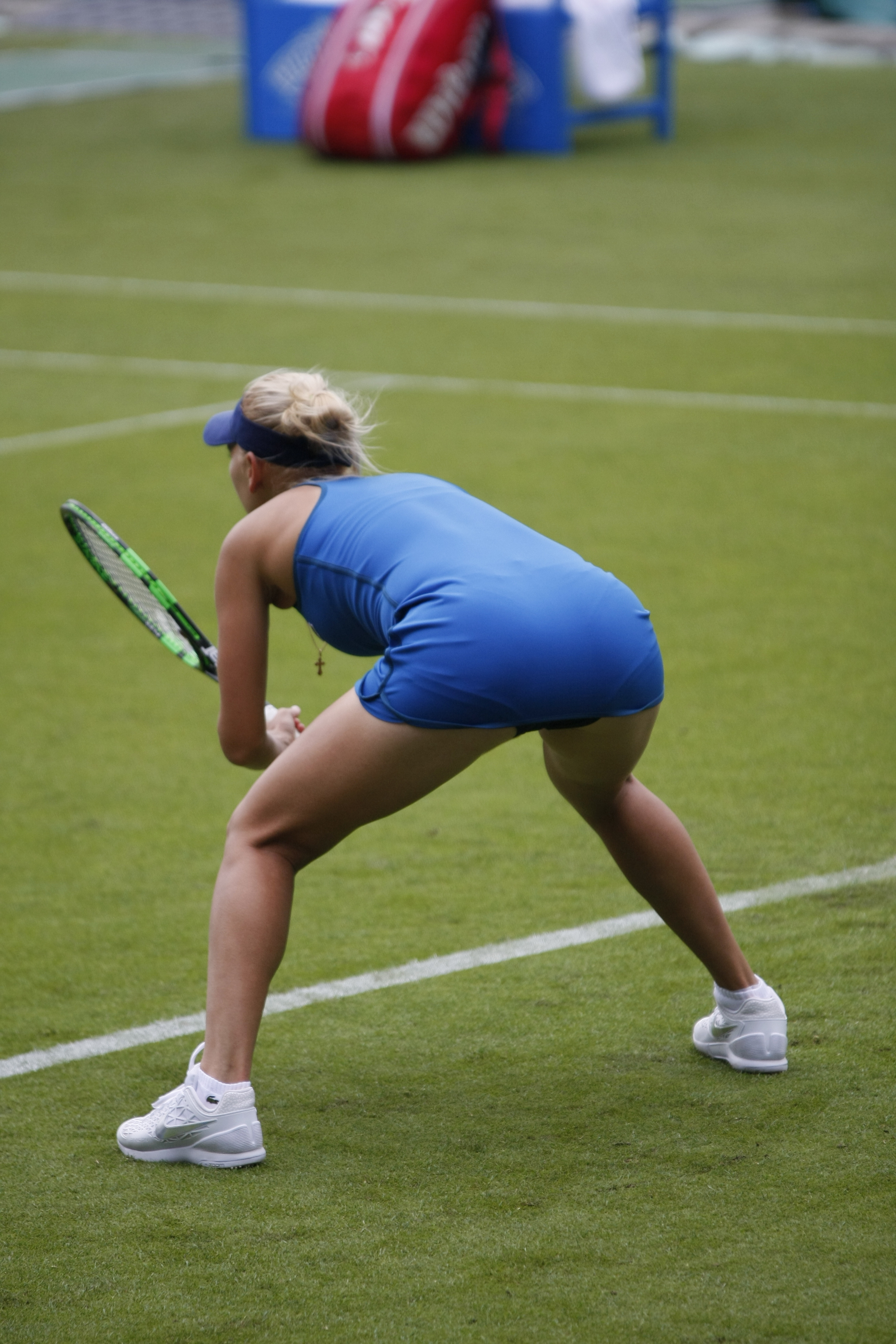
Elena Vesnina waiting to receive a serve in partial squatting position.

== See also ==
- Glossary of tennis terms
- Tennis shots
