= Point (tennis) =

Smallest subdivision of a tennis match

A point in tennis is the smallest subdivision of the match. A point can consist of a double fault by the server, in which case the point is won automatically by the receiver. In all other cases, a point begins when a legal serve is hit by the server to the receiver on the opposite side of the court, and continues until one side fails to legally return the ball to the opposite side. Whichever side fails to do so loses the point and their opponent wins it.

In the advantage scoring system, the first side to win four points by a two-point margin wins the game. To start a game, both sides begin at "love" (zero points). The first point won by a side is called "15," the second point is "30," and the third point is "40." If both sides have won three points in a game (i.e., 40-40), the score is called "deuce." From deuce, whichever side wins the following point is said to have "advantage" and can win the game by winning the next point (two-point margin). If the side with advantage loses the next point, the score returns to deuce, and play continues until one side wins two consecutive points from deuce, thereby winning the game.

Alternatively, if no-advantage (no-ad) scoring is used, then the first side to win four points wins the game, without the requirement of a two-point margin. No-ad scoring means any one game will consist of a maximum of seven points, as opposed to advantage scoring which allows for a hypothetically infinite number of points per game. For this reason, no-ad scoring is used in some competition formats to ensure quicker matches.

During a tiebreak game, each side's points are counted more simply as 0, 1, 2, etc. rather than love, 15, 30, etc. used during other games. A standard tiebreak is won by the first side to win seven points by a two-point margin. Other variations (e.g., 10-point tiebreak) are sometimes used.

== Play of a single point ==
The players (or teams) stand on opposite sides of the net. One player is designated the server, and the opposing player (or, in doubles, one of the opposing players) is the receiver. The players (or teams) alternate serving with each game. From point-to-point within a game, the server alternates serving from the right and left sides of their court. The first point of a game is always served from the server's right side. At the start of each point, the server stands behind their baseline, anywhere between the center line and the sideline, and serves the ball at the service box diagonally opposite. The receiver may stand anywhere on their side of the net and prepare to return the serve.

A legal serve is any serve which is not a "fault." A fault occurs if the ball does not land in the appropriate service box on the receiver's side of the net. Service faults are also incurred for missing the ball, stepping on the baseline, center line, or sideline before striking the ball (foot fault), and walking or running while serving. Two consecutive faults (double fault) result in the receiver winning the point. The receiver must allow the serve to bounce once before returning it, or else the server automatically wins the point.

If the ball touches the net during an otherwise legal serve ("let" or "net" service), the serve is retaken without being counted as a fault. After the serve, if the ball touches the net during the point but lands safely on the opposite side, then play continues as normal without stopping.

Once a legal serve is made, the players then alternate returning the ball from their side of the court to the opponent's side. The point is lost by whichever player first:

- allows the ball to bounce on the player's own side of the court, and then fails to hit the ball before it bounces a second time, or
- hits the ball, unless either
  - the ball safely bounces on the first bounce in the opponent's court (although the ball may hit the net before bouncing), or
  - before it bounces, the ball is hit by the opponent, or hits the opponent
- intentionally contacts the ball with the racket more than once, without it being hit by the opponent, (Note: This is a rare event, but Kim Clijsters lost a point this way in the semi-final of the 2006 French Open. Attempting to smash a lob from Justine Henin-Hardenne, Clijsters lightly tipped the ball, then ran around it and returned it with a second hit, which did not count.) or
- touches the ball with anything other than the racket (or with the racket after it has left the player's hand), or
- hits the ball before it has passed over the net to the player's own side, or
- touches any part of the net with their person before the point is over, or
- (in doubles) hits the ball after their partner has already done so, and before the ball has returned to the opposite side.

The rules specifically allow certain actions, such as:

- bouncing the returned ball off any part of the net, including the net post(s), before it lands in the correct court,
- returning a ball before it has bounced on the player's own side (volley), except when returning a serve in which case the served ball must be allowed to bounce
- reaching over the net to hit a ball only if the ball has already bounced on the player's own side and then moved back over the net,
- unintentionally touching the ball twice with the racket,
- returning the ball around a net post and below the height of the net, and
- returning the ball under the net cord between the net and net post.

The lines are considered part of the court and so a ball is "in" the court if it touches any part of the relevant line, even if a majority of the ball bounces outside of the line. In an officiated match, it is the duty of line umpires to call a ball "out" if it bounces outside of the relevant line(s). The chair umpire may overrule the line umpire if they believe an in or out call is clearly incorrect. On clay courts, ball marks left on the court's surface may be visually inspected by the chair umpire after a disputed call. In unofficiated matches, players are responsible for making their own calls on their respective sides of the court, in which case the ethics of the game requires honesty and a willingness to give one's opponent the benefit of the doubt.

== Instant replay ==
Computer-assisted video tracking technology can determine the precise position of a ball at impact with a margin of error less than five millimeters. (Note: The system is accurate but not error-free. During a match between Andy Murray and Ivan Ljubičić at the 2009 BNP Paribas Open in Indian Wells, Murray challenged an out call from a high lob to the sideline. The line judge, the chair umpire and Ljubicic were all certain that the ball was out, but Hawkeye showed it on the line. The system had apparently recorded the ball's second bounce, but the chair umpire had no choice but to accept the incorrect call.) Accordingly, starting with the NASDAQ-100 Open in March 2006, most top-level professional tournaments allow systems such as Hawk-Eye to be used to settle disputed line calls. When this technology is in place, players are allowed a maximum of three incorrect challenges per set. If a set reaches six games-all, then each player is awarded one additional challenge for the tiebreak.

The use of instant replay technology remains uncommon on clay courts, where visual inspection of ball marks predominates.

== Alternative rules ==
=== In American college tennis ===
As of 1999, in NCAA tennis in the United States, a let service is not retaken and the point continues without stopping.
