= Isner–Mahut match at the 2010 Wimbledon Championships =

Longest match in tennis history

Wimbledon 2010 first-round match
- (United States) John Isner (23) vs. (France) Nicolas Mahut (Q)
Set	1	2	3	4	5
(United States) John Isner	6	3	6^{7}	7^{7}	70
(France) Nicolas Mahut	4	6	7^{9}	6^{3}	68
- Date: 22–24 June 2010
- Tournament: Wimbledon
- Location: London
- Chair umpire: Mohamed Lahyani
- Duration: 11 hours 5 minutes
- World rankings: (United States) John Isner: 19 (France) Nicolas Mahut: 148

Previous head-to-head results
- Mahut 1–0 Isner
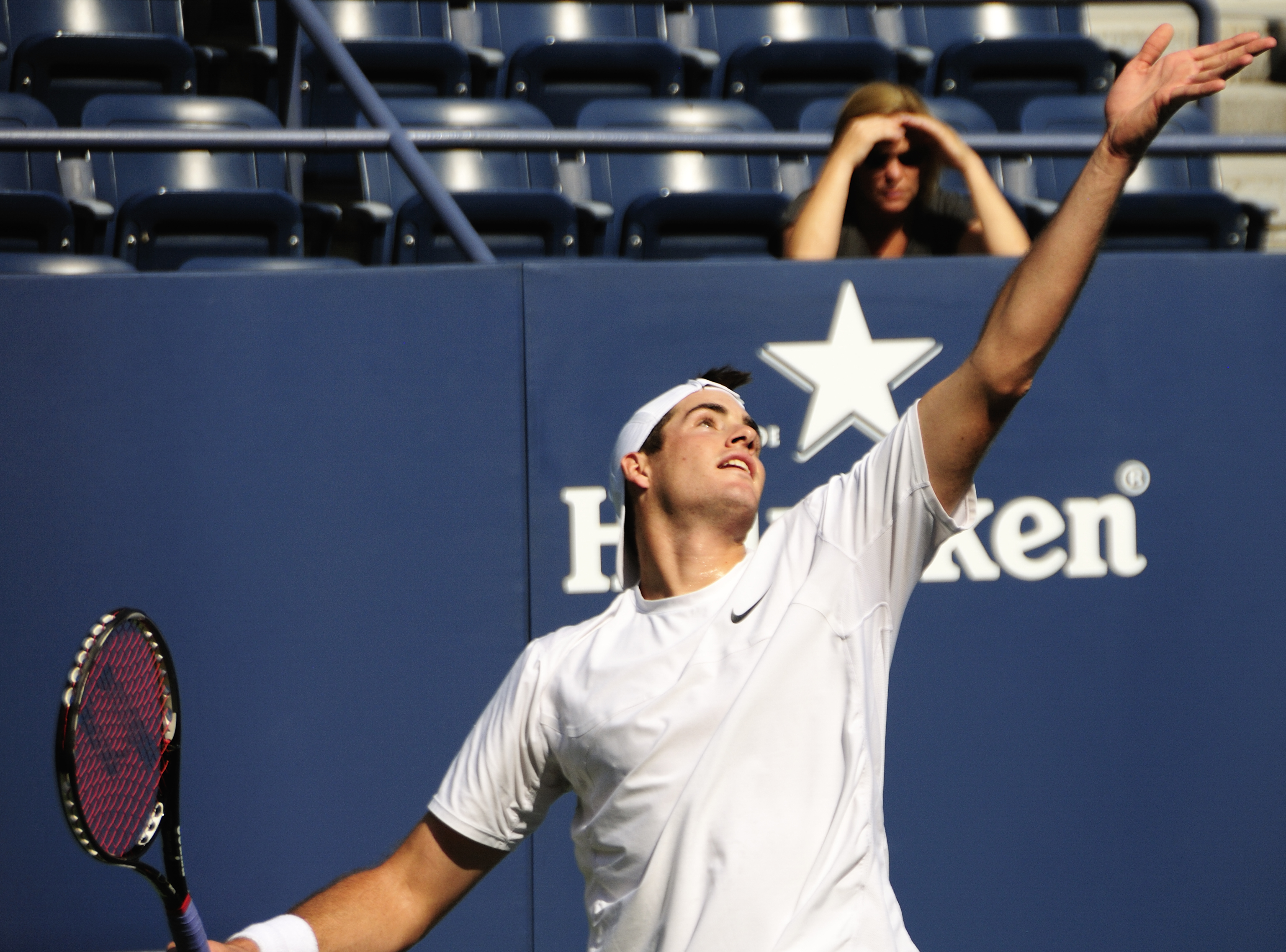
- John Isner
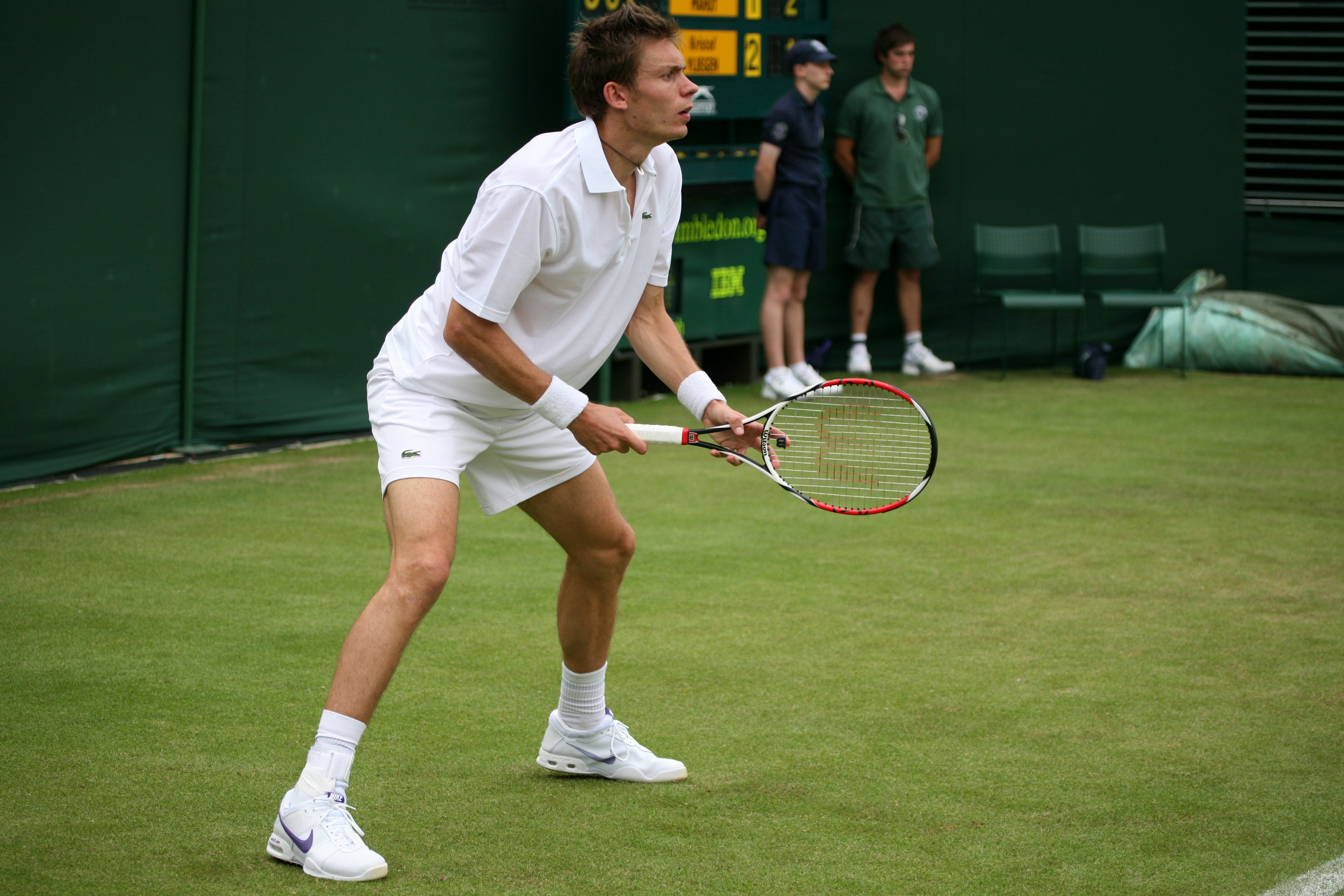
- Nicolas Mahut

From 22 to 24 June 2010, a first-round match at the men's singles tournament of the 2010 Wimbledon Championships was contested between John Isner and Nicolas Mahut. Isner, seeded 23rd, defeated Mahut, a qualifier, 6–4, 3–6, 6–7^{(7–9)}, 7–6^{(7–3)}, 70–68, in 11 hours and 5 minutes over three days. It was the longest tennis match in professional history. 183 games were played, which were also the most in a single match.

The match began at 6:13 pm on Tuesday, 22 June on Court 18 at Wimbledon. At 9:07 pm, play was suspended after the fourth set due to daylight. It resumed on Wednesday, 23 June, at 2:05 pm, with the start of the fifth set. The record for longest match was broken at 5:45 pm. Play was suspended again at 9:09 pm, when the score was tied 59–59, before resuming at 3:40 pm on Thursday, 24 June. At 4:47 pm, the match concluded in Isner's victory. The final set took 8 hours, 11 minutes and was longer than the previous sets combined. Both players broke numerous Wimbledon and tennis records, including each serving over 100 aces, with the match being referred to as "the endless match".

Following a six-hour semifinal match between Kevin Anderson and Isner at the men's singles semifinals, the 2019 tournament introduced a tie break when the score in the fifth set (third set for women's matches) reaches 12–12. Starting in 2022, a 10-point tie break at 6–6 in the final set was trialled in all Grand Slam matches.

== Background ==
The match took place during the 2010 edition of the 13-day Wimbledon Championships, held every June and July. Mahut, who was not ranked high enough to qualify for the tournament automatically, earned his place by winning in the qualifying pre-tournament, where he was seeded 27th. He played three qualification rounds, beating Frank Dancevic 6–3, 6–0, in the first round, then Alex Bogdanovic 3–6, 6–3, 24–22, and finally Stefan Koubek in five sets, 6–7(8), 3–6, 6–3, 6–4, 6–4.

Having played through the qualifying stage, Mahut was drawn against Isner in the first round of the Men's Singles. Their match was scheduled for Court 18, one of the larger outer courts at Wimbledon.

== Match ==
=== Details ===
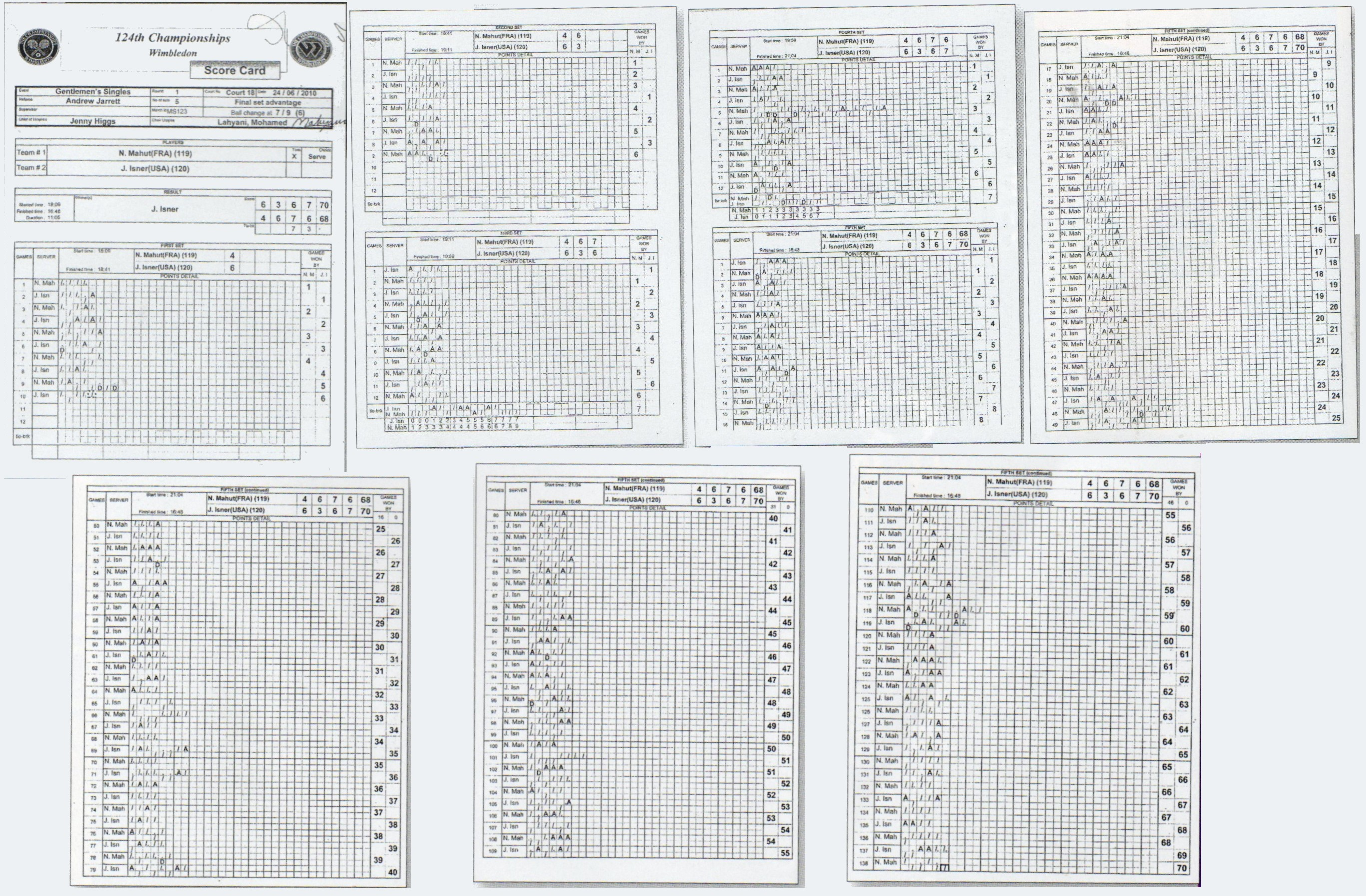
Copy of the seven-page score card of the Isner–Mahut match

The match started on the tournament's second day, 22 June. As in all men's Grand Slam matches, the match was played as best of five sets. In the first four sets of a match, a tiebreaker is used to decide a tied set, but in 2010 this did not apply in the fifth set except at the US Open. Thus, in the event of a tie in the fifth set, the players would continue to play the set until one of them led by two games.

The first four sets passed without significant incident. Isner won the first set 6–4, breaking Mahut's serve in the ninth game of the set after Mahut had twice double faulted. Mahut took the second set 6–3, having broken Isner's serve to love in the second game of the set. The third and fourth sets had no breaks of serve and were both decided by tiebreaks, with Mahut winning the third set tiebreak 9–7, and Isner winning the fourth set tiebreak 7–3, leaving the score at two sets each. At the end of the fourth set, the match was halted due to darkness.

Resuming on 23 June, it soon became the longest match ever. Isner failed to convert four match points on this day, the first when Mahut was serving at 9–10, the second and third when Mahut was serving at 32–33, and the fourth in the dramatic last game that they played at 58–59 on 23 June, with Mahut initially serving up 40–15 for the hold. Mahut also failed to convert two break points on Isner's serve, at 50–50. The match was suspended for a second time because of darkness on the evening of 23 June at 59–59 in the fifth set despite chants of "We want more, we want more" from the spectators.

Isner drank a "recovery shake" and took an ice bath. Fellow American Andy Roddick brought takeaway food for him and his coach, including "three boxes of pizza, all sorts of chicken and mashed potatoes"; Isner said later that he was so hungry he "could have eaten 12 Big Macs", but reported that drinking coconut water helped him rehydrate and avoid the cramping that he had experienced in the past. He slept for less than four hours before rising. Mahut also slept for only a few hours, and had a cold bath and a massage. The next morning, the BBC reported that Mahut had been practising and Andy Murray informed them that Isner had been running on a treadmill before play resumed.

The match was resumed on 24 June, and both players continued to dominate their service games. With Isner serving at 68–68, Mahut went up 0–30, but Isner won 4 points in a row to hold serve. At 68–69, with Mahut serving at 15–15, Mahut netted a drop shot that would likely have won the point. Isner, far back in the court at the time, later said that he would not have had the energy to chase after that shot. At 30–30, Isner passed Mahut at the net with a difficult inside-out forehand from the middle of the court that landed just inside the line. This brought up Isner's fifth match point (his first on 24 June) and his 14th break point of the match, which Isner converted with a down-the-line backhand passing shot. Thus, after 67 minutes of play on the third day of the match, Isner won the deciding final set, 70–68. The entire match over the 3 days lasted 11 hours and 5 minutes. This new world record for the longest match ever was 4 hours and 32 minutes longer than the previous record, the first-round match between Fabrice Santoro and Arnaud Clément at the 2004 French Open, which had lasted 6 hours, 33 minutes.

=== Officials ===
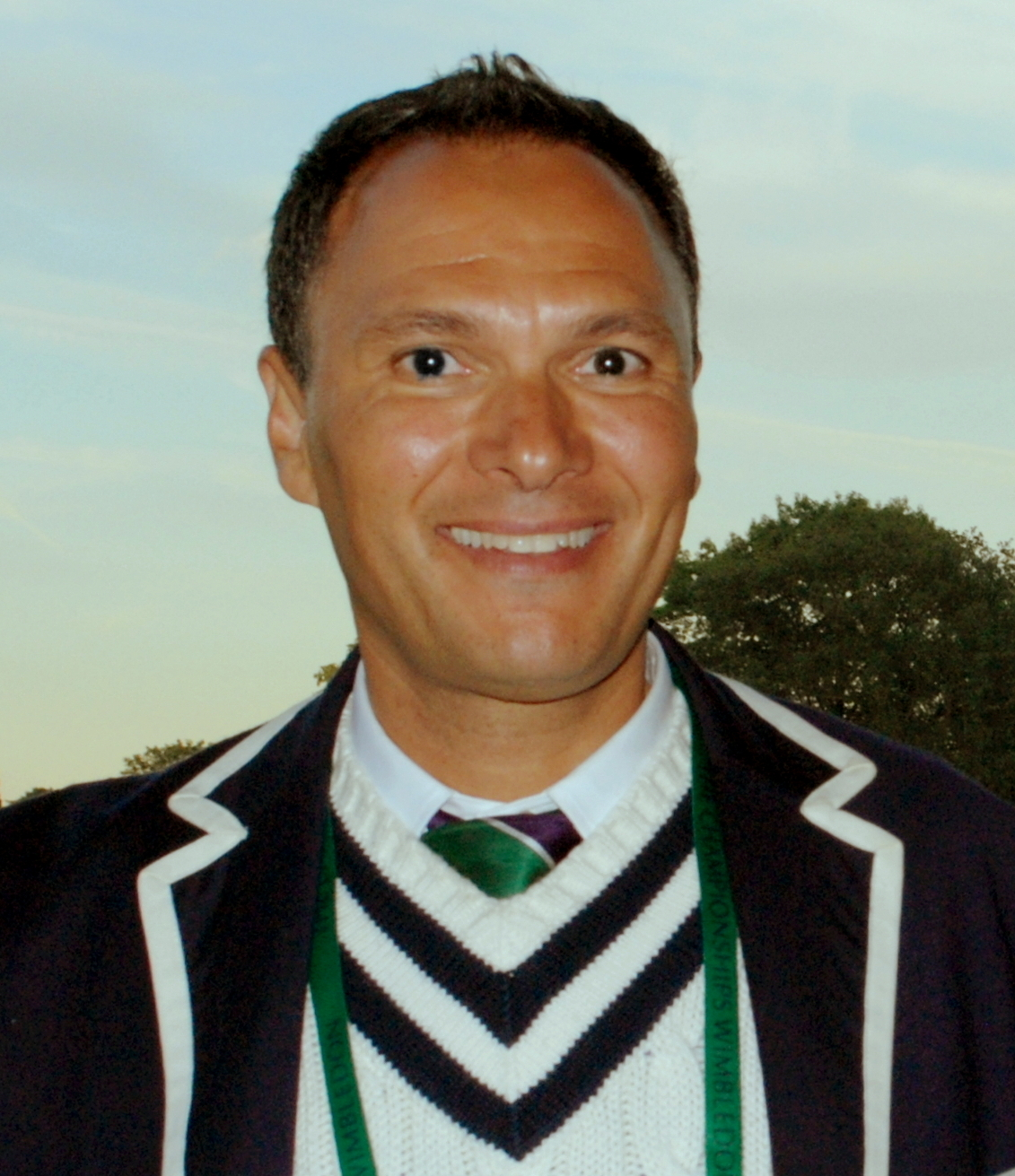
Mohamed Lahyani

The chair umpire throughout the match was the Swedish official Mohamed Lahyani. Lahyani said afterwards that he was so "gripped by the amazing match" that his concentration stayed solid and he did not think about eating or going to the toilet. On the second day of the match, two groups of 14 linespeople and four groups of 28 ballboys and ballgirls were used in a rotation. At the end of the match, Lahyani announced the score incorrectly, accidentally switching the scores of the two tie-break sets.

=== Failing scoreboard ===
On the second day of play, the courtside scoreboard stood still at 47–47 and later went dark. IBM programmers said it was only programmed to go to 47–47 but would be fixed by the next day. The online scoreboard at the official website lasted slightly longer; it was reset at 50–50. Users were asked to "please add 50 to the Isner/Mahut game score". An IBM programmer worked on a hotfix for the scoring system until 11:45 p.m. to accommodate the match's scores for the next day, although it would have again malfunctioned had the match gone beyond 25 more games.

== Aftermath ==
=== Special recognition ===
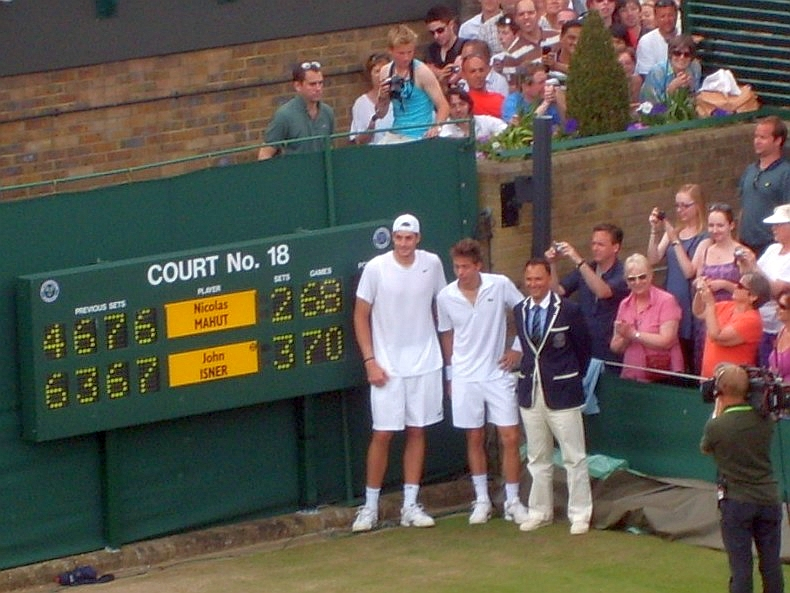
Players and umpire pose by the scoreboard after the match

Immediately after the match, both players and the umpire were presented with a crystal bowl and champagne flutes by Tim Henman and Ann Haydon-Jones on behalf of the All England Club, as special recognition of the match. The players were then interviewed on court by John Inverdale, before a photocall for the press alongside one of the two Court 18 scoreboards showing the score. Mahut subsequently donated memorabilia from the match for display at the International Tennis Hall of Fame's Museum in Newport, Rhode Island.

On 14 July, Isner and Mahut were jointly awarded the 2010 ESPY Award for "Best Record-Breaking Performance", beating fellow nominees Roger Federer and Usain Bolt. Isner accepted the award in Los Angeles on behalf of both men. In addition, the AELTC placed a plaque commemorating the match at Court 18.

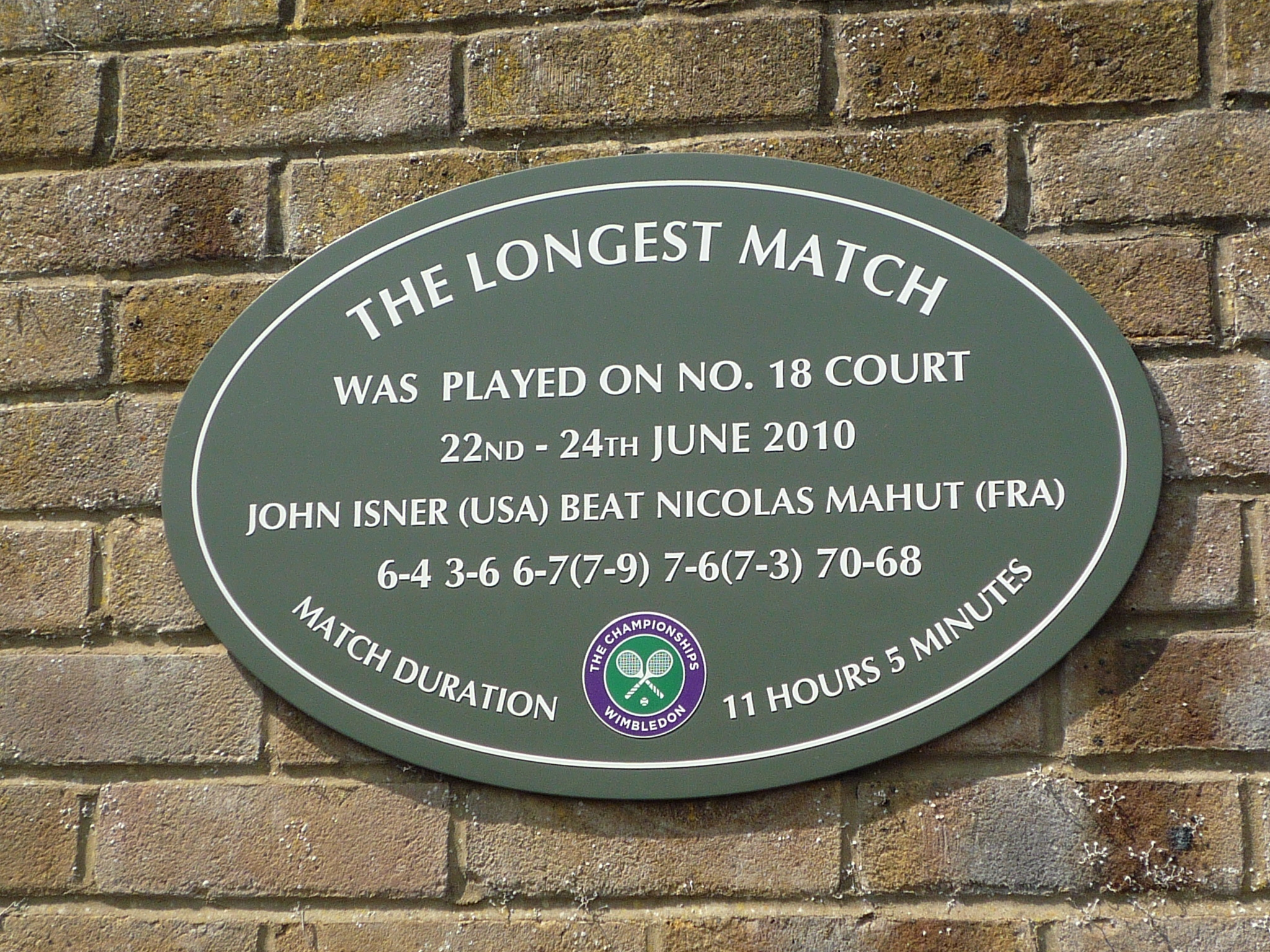
Plaque on Wimbledon Court No. 18 to commemorate the longest match in tennis history between John Isner and Nicolas Mahut on 22–24 June 2010

Time named this match one of the Top 10 Sports Moments of 2010.

=== Players' subsequent schedules ===
As the winner, Isner advanced to the second round where, on the day following the conclusion of his match with Mahut, he played Thiemo de Bakker on 25 June at 12 pm on Court 5. The match was originally scheduled for 24 June but was postponed due to the continuance of Isner's first-round match against Mahut. De Bakker also had a lengthy first-round match against Santiago Giraldo, winning by a score of 16–14 in the fifth set, but unlike Isner, he had a day off before his second-round match. Isner lost to De Bakker 0–6, 3–6, 2–6 in just 74 minutes. It was the shortest men's Wimbledon match at that point in 2010, and Isner failed to serve a single ace. Isner was visibly exhausted and required medical treatment for neck and shoulder problems throughout the match.

Isner was also due to play a doubles match with his partner Sam Querrey on 24 June (against Michał Przysiężny and Dudi Sela), but it was postponed to 25 June. Isner's doubles match was tentatively scheduled as the second match of that day on Court 19 following another men's doubles match; however, they withdrew from the doubles because Isner had a blister on his toe. After being eliminated from the tournament, Isner said, "I'll watch sports, I'll take in the World Cup, I'll go fishing, I'll do whatever. Just anything away from the tennis court."

As for Mahut, his doubles match with partner Arnaud Clément against Colin Fleming and Ken Skupski started late in the evening on 24 June (also on Court 18); the match was suspended after Mahut and Clément had lost the first set. On 25 June, Mahut/Clément – Fleming/Skupski was scheduled as the fourth match on Court 18 because Clément had a third-round singles match on Centre Court against Roger Federer. Because the match between Daniel Brands and Victor Hănescu lasted almost 3 hours, 30 minutes and ended around 8:45 pm local time, the doubles match was postponed again; it was rescheduled as the first match on Court 14 on 26 June. On resumption, Fleming/Skupski defeated Mahut/Clément, 7–6, 6–4, 3–6, 7–6.

The two next met at the 2011 Hopman Cup exhibition in Perth. Isner broke in the opening game to record a win in straight sets. They met again at the 2011 Wimbledon Championships, again in the first round. The odds of the unseeded players meeting in another first round match was 1 in 142. Isner won "Isner–Mahut II" in straight sets (7–6, 6–2, 7–6), in 2 hours and 3 minutes.

=== Reaction ===
Former players and commentators have called the match historic and unlikely to happen again; many also praised both participants. John McEnroe said, "This is the greatest advertisement for our sport. It makes me proud to be a part of it. We often don't get the respect we deserve in tennis for the athletic demands it places on players, but this should push that respect way up".

Other players, former players, officials, media commentators and fans also praised the behaviour of both players. Roger Federer said of the match, "It's so impressive to see. I mean, I was watching this. I don't know if I was crying or laughing. It was too much". Federer also added, "This is absolutely amazing. [...] This is beyond anything". Novak Djokovic extolled both players, saying, "You have to give them credit, both of them. Whoever wins today, I think both of them are winners".

Sports Illustrated's Jon Wertheim said that the victory might give Isner a self-esteem boost. McEnroe speculated, however, that the match might have shortened Isner's and Mahut's careers by six months, though both players ended up enjoying long, successful careers with Isner and Mahut playing another thirteen years and fifteen years respectively after the match. A sports surgeon said the players had risked dehydration, hyperthermia, and kidney damage during the long match, and that one or both might suffer "some sort of injury or persistent problem over the next six months [...] shoulder problems, tendonitis, and recurrent knee problems", as well as the inability to "get into a groove" mentally for up to a year. Mahut revealed that following the match, he spent three months suffering from depression and a back injury.

Mahut shared his experiences on the match in the book Le match de ma vie (The Match of My Life), which he co-wrote with Philippe Bouin. The book was published in 2011.

=== Rule change ===
In October 2018, three months after another marathon match featuring Isner – this time against Kevin Anderson in the semifinals of 2018 Wimbledon, which Anderson won 7–6^{(8–6)}, 6–7^{(5–7)}, 6–7^{(9–11)}, 6–4, 26–24 after 6 hours and 36 minutes, the All England Club announced that Wimbledon would be introducing a rule change to prevent such long matches occurring in the future. From 2019 to 2021, tie breaks were to be played at Wimbledon if the final set score reached 12–all. This point was determined following a review of matches in the previous 20 tournaments and a consultation with players and officials. The rule was first used in the singles in the 2019 Wimbledon final between Roger Federer and Novak Djokovic, after their fifth set ended that way. In 2022, it was announced that all Grand Slam tournaments (and the Olympics) would collectively trial a new 10-point tie-break where scores reach 6–6 in the final set; prior to this, the French Open had been the last tournament to exclude tie-breaks from the final set.

=== Further recognition ===
Wimbledon had planned to recognise the players on the 10th anniversary of the match, but was unable to do so owing to their decision to cancel the 2020 Wimbledon Championships in the wake of the COVID-19 pandemic. Instead, Wimbledon posted video coverage of the match in its entirety on its YouTube channel. In lieu of an in-person reunion, John Isner and Nicolas Mahut celebrated their anniversary via social networks. Isner joked about Mahut's hairstyle: "Nicolas Mahut, I can't believe it's been 10 years. Your hair hasn't moved an inch yet!" For his part, Mahut replied: "Happy birthday friend John Isner. We should take some time together to remember that amazing story."

== In popular culture ==
The chorus of Dan Bern's song about the match concludes with the scores of the five sets: "six–four, three–six, six–seven, seven–six, seventy–sixty-eight". An a cappella performance of "Isner & Mahut" recorded in 2010 appears on Bern's album Live in New York.

HBO released a mockumentary in 2015 titled 7 Days in Hell, starring Andy Samberg and Kit Harington as two professional tennis players who face off in what becomes the longest match in history. The match takes place at Wimbledon in 2001. The film was inspired by the Isner–Mahut match and included former and current professional tennis players in cameo roles playing themselves, including John McEnroe, Chris Evert and Serena Williams.

This match also has a mention in Mr. B The Gentleman Rhymer's 2016 song "Open String" from the album There's a Rumpus Going On.

The 2018 novel Chance to Break by Owen Prell builds its narrative climax around the Isner–Mahut match.

An episode of SB Nation's Rewinder on 9 July 2022, focuses on the match and the background and context as to how it happened.

== Records ==
The match set at least eleven tennis records:

- Longest match (11 hours, 5 minutes).
- Longest set (the fifth set required 8 hours, 11 minutes). This set alone would have broken the previous record for longest match.
- Longest play in a match on a single day (7 hr 4 min was played on day 2). This part of set 5 alone would have broken the previous record for longest match.
- Most games in a set (138 in the fifth set).
- Most games in a match (183).
- Most aces in a match by one player (Isner, 113).
- Total aces in a match (Mahut's 103 aces, the second highest number by a player in a match, brought the total to 216).
- Consecutive service games held in a match (168: 84 times each for both Isner and Mahut).
- Most games won by both winning player (92) and losing player (91) in a match.
- Most points won in a match (Mahut 502, Isner 478).
- Most points in a match (980).

The previous record for games played in a match was the 122-game 1973 Davis Cup match in which the United States team of Stan Smith and Erik van Dillen defeated the Chile team of Patricio Cornejo and Jaime Fillol 7–9, 37–39, 8–6, 6–1, 6–3. The previous record for most games in a singles match was the 112-game 1969 match in which Pancho Gonzales defeated Charlie Pasarell 22–24, 1–6, 16–14, 6–3, 11–9, also in the first round at Wimbledon. The singles record since the introduction of the tie-break was the 2003 Australian Open quarter-final match, in which Andy Roddick and Younes El Aynaoui played 83 games; Roddick won 4–6, 7–6(5), 4–6, 6–4, 21–19.

The previous official record for duration was set at the 2004 French Open when Fabrice Santoro defeated Arnaud Clément 6–4, 6–3, 6–7(5), 3–6, 16–14, in 6 hours, 33 minutes. The unofficial record of 6 hours, 40 minutes, was set on 25 February 2009, when Chris Eaton defeated James Ward 6–3, 6–2, 6–7(3), 2–6, 21–19 in a playoff match to represent the Great Britain Davis Cup team in a 2009 Davis Cup Europe/Africa Zone Group I second round tie versus Ukraine. Isner–Mahut's fifth set alone lasted some 90 minutes longer than the previous longest match. Indeed, even that portion of the fifth set played on the second day was about half an hour longer than the previous longest match, so it also broke the record for the longest play in a single day.

John Isner served his 79th ace to take the final set to 39–38 with serve. This surpassed Ivo Karlović's 78 aces that he served on 18 September 2009 in a Davis Cup match against Radek Štěpánek. In all, Isner served 113 aces; Mahut also surpassed the previous record with 103 aces.

== Coverage ==
In the United Kingdom, the match was featured live in part on BBC One, BBC Two and BBC HD, which were all the television channels which the BBC used to cover Wimbledon. The match was broadcast live in its entirety on the BBC Red Button.

Commentating for the BBC during this match were Ronald McIntosh and Mark Cox on the first day, and McIntosh and Greg Rusedski on the second and third days. It was McIntosh's first ever Wimbledon commentary and became the longest continuous commentary for a single match in broadcasting history.

The fifth set of the match was covered by Xan Brooks of the Guardian on their Wimbledon Live Blog and continued the following day by Nicky Bandini.

In the United States, ESPN and sibling channel ESPN2 telecast the match.

== Match statistics ==
=== Score ===
	1 32 mins	2 29 mins	3 49 mins	4 64 mins	5 491 mins
(United States) John Isner (23)	6	3	6^{7}	7^{7}	70
(France) Nicolas Mahut (Q)	4	6	7^{9}	6^{3}	68

=== Session times ===
All times in British Summer Time (UTC+1)

Tuesday 22 June 2010

- 6:13 pm – Match begins on Court 18
- 6:45 pm – Isner wins the first set by 6–4
- 7:14 pm – Mahut wins the second set by 6–3
- 8:03 pm – Mahut wins the third set by 7–6, after winning the tiebreak 9–7
- 9:07 pm – Isner wins the fourth set by 7–6, after winning the tiebreak 7–3. Play is suspended at two sets all. Total match time at this point was 2 hours, 54 minutes.

Wednesday 23 June 2010

- 2:05 pm – Match resumes on Court 18 for the start of the fifth set
- 5:45 pm – Match becomes the longest official match in history. The score at this point was 32–32 in the fifth set
- 9:09 pm – Play is suspended for a second time, with the score tied at 59–59 in the fifth and deciding set. Total match time at this point was 9 hours, 58 minutes.

Thursday 24 June 2010

- 3:40 pm – Match resumes on Court 18 at 59–59 in the fifth set
- 4:47 pm – Match ends in favour of John Isner, who won the final set 70–68. Total match time was 11 hours, 5 minutes.

=== Detailed statistics ===
From Wimbledon's official website

Isner	Statistic	Mahut
361 of 491 = 73.5%	1st serve %	328 of 489 = 67.1%
10	Double faults	21
52	Unforced errors	39
292 of 361 = 80.9%	Winning % on 1st serve	284 of 328 = 86.6%
82 of 130 = 63.1%	Winning % on 2nd serve	101 of 161 = 62.7%
246	Winners	244
104 of 489 = 21.3%	Receiving points won	117 of 491 = 23.8%
2	Return Games Won	1
2 of 14 = 14.3%	Break point conversions	1 of 3 = 33.3%
97 of 144 = 67.4%	Net approaches	111 of 155 = 71.6%
478	Total points	502
92	Games won	91
113	Aces	103
143 mph (230 km/h)	Fastest serve speed	128 mph (206 km/h)
123 mph (198 km/h)	Average 1st serve speed	118 mph (190 km/h)
112 mph (180 km/h)	Average 2nd serve speed	101 mph (163 km/h)
Total points include double faults by the opponent. Unforced errors include double faults.
