= Bevel (disambiguation) =

A Bevel is an angled edge.

Bevel may also refer to:

== People ==
- Bevel (surname)

== Sports ==
- The edges of a racket handle in sports such as
  - Badminton
  - Pickleball
  - Tennis

== Other ==
- Bevel, Belgium, a town in the Nijlen municipality
- Bevel gears, a cone-shaped gear
- Beveled glass, a glass sheet with an angled edge
- Clapboard, or bevel siding
- Nissan Bevel, a 2007 concept car

== See also ==
- Chamfer
