= Two-handed =

Two-handed or Double-handed may refer to:

- Ambidextrous
- Double-handed grip in tennis
- Category:Two-player card games
- Two-handed sword
- Two-handed bowling
- Two-handed manual alphabet, alphabetic writing system
- Two-handed throwing, throwing sport aggregating distances thrown with each hand

== See also ==
- Two-hander, play for two actors
