= Closed face =

Closed face or Closed-face may refer to:

- A manner of holding the paddle in the sport of pickleball
- A type of club in the sport of golf
- A standard sandwich enclosed in two slices of bread, when distinguished from an open-faced sandwich atop one slice of bread
- A spincast fishing reel
