= Backcourt =

Backcourt or Back court may refer to:

- A section of the court in some net and racket sports including;
  - Back court (tennis)
  - Backcourt (pickleball)
- Backcourt (basketball)
