= Backswing =

Backswing, Back swing or Back-swing may refer to:

- Backswing in a club sport, such as the back-swing in a golfing stroke
- Backswing in a bat and ball sport, such as batting (baseball) or batting (cricket)
- Backswing in a racket sport, such as badminton, pickleball, racquetball, squash, or tennis
- Backswing in a stick sport, such as field hockey or ice hockey
