= Service area =

Service area may refer to:

- Rest area, a public facility, located next to a large thoroughfare such as a highway, at which drivers and passengers can rest, eat, or refuel
  - Motorway service area, a type of rest area in UK and Ireland
- Service area (computing), a hidden portion of the hard disk drive that usually contains drive's firmware and adaptive data required for normal operation of the device
- Service court (disambiguation)
