= Service court =

Service court or service box is the area the served object must land in certain racket sports such as:

- Badminton
- Pickleball
- Tennis
