= Bevel (surname) =

Bevel or Bevell is a surname. Notable people with the surname include:

- Darrell Bevell (born 1970), an American Football coach
- James Bevel (1936–2008), American Christian minister and Civil Rights leader
- Ken Bevel (born 1968), American Marine Corps officer, pastor, and actor

== See also ==
- Bevel (disambiguation)
