= Nissan Bevel =

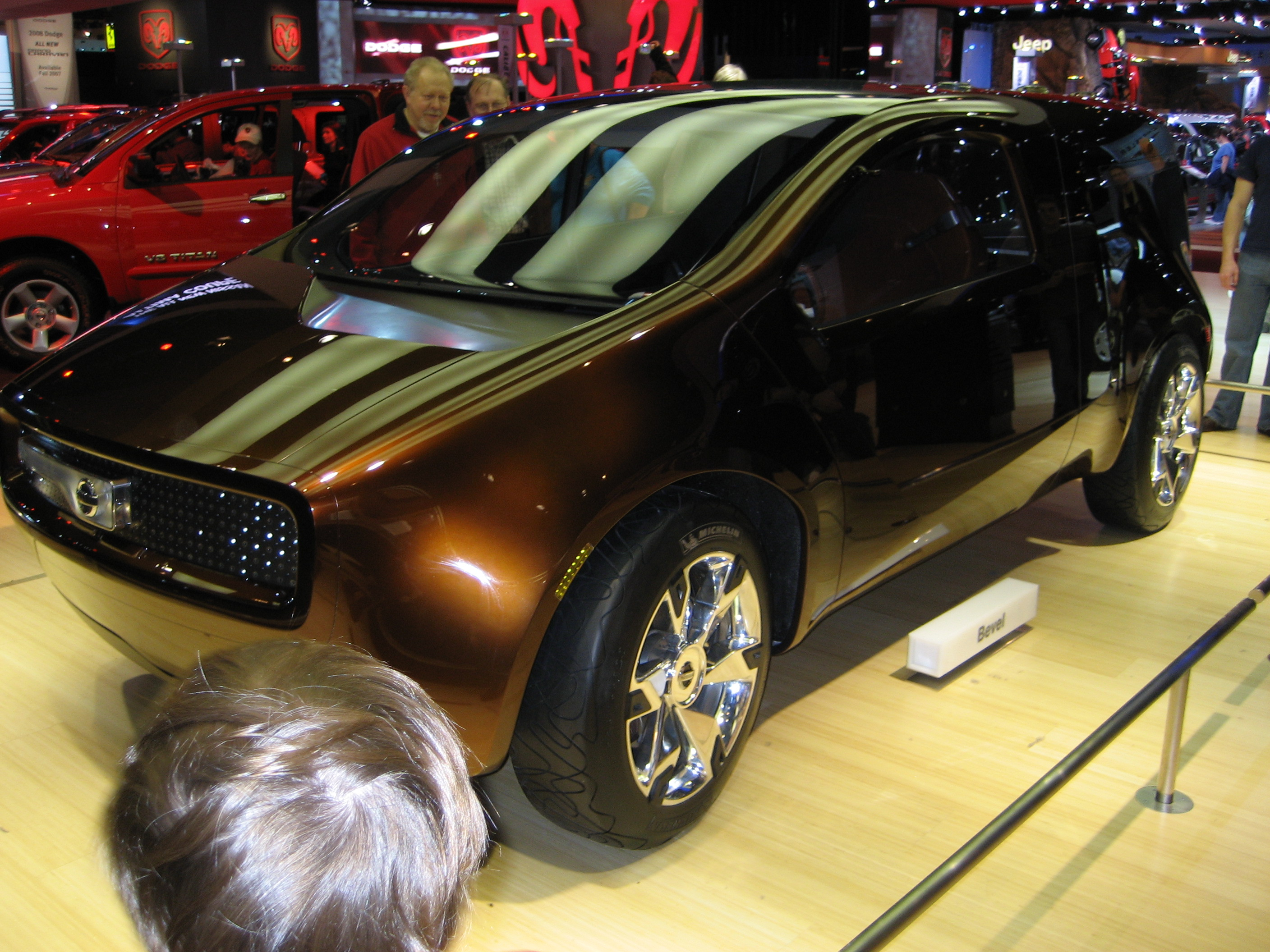

Overview
- Manufacturer: Nissan
- Production: 2007 (concept only)

Body and chassis
- Class: Full-size crossover SUV
- Body style: 4-door van

Powertrain
- Engine: Nissan 2.5-liter V6 HEV

Dimensions
- Wheelbase: 115.4-inch/2931mm
- Length: 173.2-inch/4399mm
- Width: 75.0-inch/1905mm
- Height: 63.8-inch/1621mm

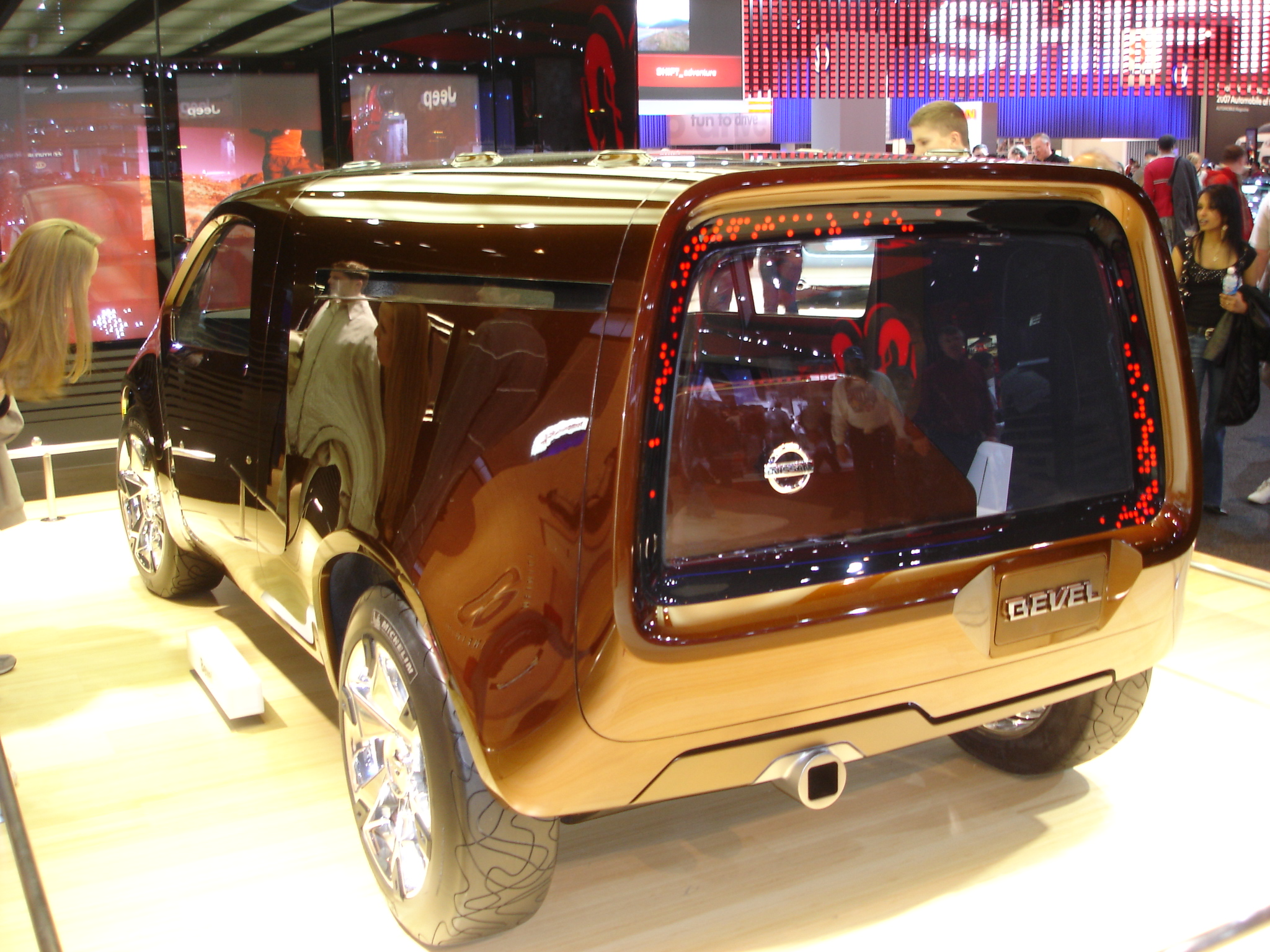
Rear view

The Nissan Bevel was a concept crossover SUV unveiled at the 2007 North American International Auto Show. It was of asymmetrical design, with regular front and rear doors on the passenger side, but just one large driver's side door.

Carlos Tavares, Nissan Motor Co. executive president of global product planning and design, said the Bevel was a design study for 45- to 60-year-old male customers who like to keep many tools in their vehicle, transport things, do projects outside the house and only rarely carry passengers. The owner would be driving alone 90 percent of the time, Tavares imagined. The Bevel showed innovative power folding seats, with front-hinged seat-bases, to first fold over upward and forward – giving way to the seatbacks folding forward conventionally, and fully flat, resulting in a single, flat, long load space from the dashboard rearwards.

Nissan never planned to produce the Bevel, rather intending it to inform future models.

One of the concept vehicles was at Express Scrap Metals, a wrecking yard just outside Nashville, Tennessee, alongside the 2002 Nissan Quest concept in early March 2022. Both the Bevel, and Quest concept were destroyed, along with the 1999 NCS concept.
