= Backhand =

Tennis shot

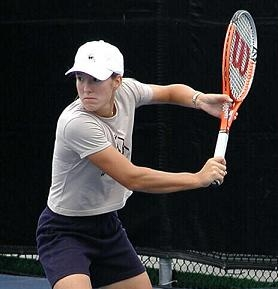
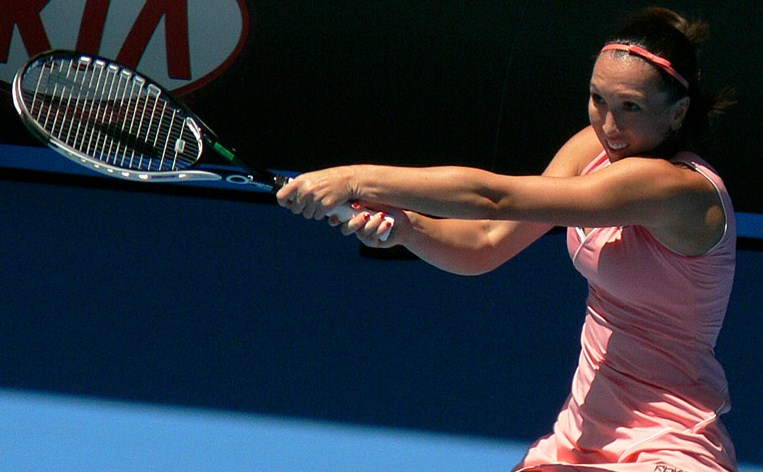
Justine Henin (left) and Jelena Janković (right) in a backhand stroke

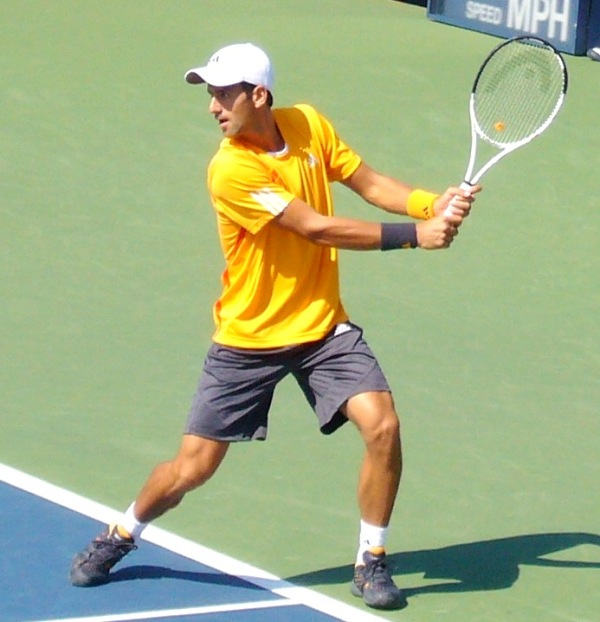
Novak Djokovic in a backhand motion at the 2009 US Open

The backhand is a shot used in most racket sports, such as tennis, table tennis and pickleball, where the back of the hand precedes the palm when swinging the racket. Except in the phrase backhand volley, the term refers to a groundstroke (where the ball has bounced before it is struck). It contrasts with the forehand stroke, where the palm precedes the back of the hand. The term is also used in other sports where a similar motion is employed, such as throwing a sport disc.

The backhand is usually performed from the baseline or as an approach shot. For a right-handed player, a backhand begins with the racquet on the left side of the body, continues across the body as contact is made with the ball, and ends on the right side of the body, with the racquet over the right shoulder. The backhand can be a one-handed or two-handed stroke.

Because the player's dominant hand "pulls" into the shot, the backhand generally lacks the power and consistency of the forehand, and is usually considered more difficult to master. However, the two-handed backhand provides more stability and power for the shot, and is increasingly used in the modern game. Beginner and club-level players often have difficulty hitting a backhand, and junior players may have trouble making the shot if they are not strong enough to hit it. Many advanced players still have a significantly better forehand than backhand, and many strategies in tennis aim to exploit this weakness.

== Grips ==
For most of the 20th century, the backhand was hit with one hand using either an eastern or continental grip. The first notable players to use a two-handed backhand were the 1930s Australians Vivian McGrath and John Bromwich. Beginning with Mike Belkin, who was the first two-handed backhand player in the United States, and Chris Evert, in the 1960s many players began to use a two-handed grip for the backhand. Pete Sampras and Stefan Edberg notably switched from the two-handed to the one-handed backhand late in their development.

== Types of backhand ==
For tennis's first 100 years, the one-handed backhand was the almost exclusive weapon of choice for players at all levels. Throughout this time, isolated individuals deployed two-handed backhand, however this never became widespread. The use of two-handed backhand began to increase at the arrival of the Open era, led by some of the most successful elite, notably Jimmy Connors and Bjorn Borg, as well as Chris Evert on the women's side. But it was not until the 1990s and later that it became the more widespread or dominant topspin backhand of choice among professional elites, exemplified by the success of Andre Agassi among men and Monica Seles among women.

=== One-handed backhand ===
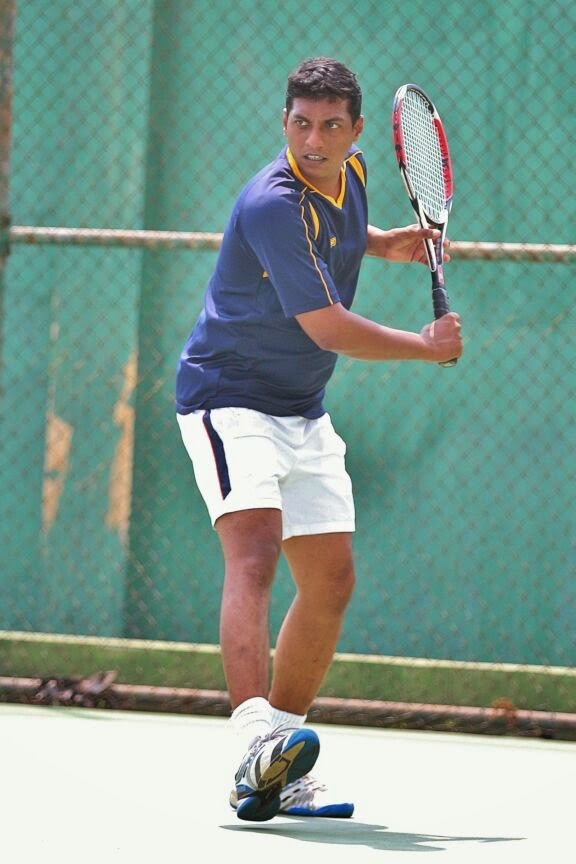
Single-handed backhand stance in tennis

One-handed backhands have some advantages over two-handed backhands:

- Modern one-handed backhands typically have significantly more topspin and torque than two-handed backhands, which allows them to create more acute angles and pull the opponent off the court more easily, especially on the clay.
- One-handed backhands can generate more power when properly set up, and can be very penetrating when hit correctly. They can also hit lower balls with more pace and penetration than two-handed backhands.
- One-handed backhand players move to the net with greater ease than two-handed players because the shot permits greater forward momentum and has greater similarities in muscle memory to the preferred type of backhand volley (one-handed, for greater reach). This is why a majority of serve and volleyers employ a one-handed backhand.
- One-handed backhands should be hit more in front of the body than the forehand, which allows them to be hit with a deeper hit spot.
- One-handed backhands force players to hit high balls with slice, thus causing them to develop much better slice backhands than two-handed players.

Generally, both backhands are efficient at what they do. Perhaps the biggest weakness cited by some coaches in regards to the one hander is the fact that it requires more time and steps to be set up properly—it requires an extra half step in order to execute a proper back-swing and have proper control over the point of contact—a traditional one handed backhand is hit from a closed stance with the dominant foot placed in front, whereas the two hander can be hit both from open and closed stance. This can hamper players who use a one handed backhand on fast surfaces as the high speed of most drive shots gives them very little time for preparation and setting up their shot. However, players with a modern one-handed backhand such as Stan Wawrinka, Denis Shapovalov, Stefanos Tsitsipas or Grigor Dimitrov can hit it with an open stance and off the back foot, too.

There are also many players who can set up their shots properly even with little time for preparation and can hit effective backhands with one hand even on fast surfaces (a notable example is the former world No. 1 Roger Federer, who had the ability to hit drives with his backhand on all surfaces with the same consistency as two handers). Stan Wawrinka is another example of a player who hits consistent one hand backhand drives on all types of surface with the same margin of error. The type of backhand a player uses mostly comes down to personal preference and their game style. Since the 1970s, however, the two-handed backhand has had a spike in popularity and is now more widely taught than the one-handed backhand.

Many tennis greats use and have used the one-handed backhand including Roger Federer, Stefan Edberg and Suzanne Lenglen.

=== Two-handed backhand ===
Players often choose their backhand type based on their hand dominance—if the player is somewhat ambidextrous, the two-handed backhand might be best.

Starting from the 1970s, many of the greatest players used the two-handed backhand and it has become more popular on the pro tour. Two-handed backhands have some important advantages over one-handed backhands:

- They generally provide a better combination of quick power and accuracy, because having two hands on the racquet makes the contact more stable, allowing for more control of the shot, especially on the return of serve and in defense, while one-handed backhands generally require finer motor skills and are less consistent in longer rallies.
- Two-handed backhands can more easily hit higher balls.
- Two-handed backhands have a chance to be consistently closer in power and accuracy to the forehand, possibly even surpassing it. People with a noticeably weaker one-handed backhand tend to get balls returned to them on that wing, giving them a disadvantage, especially with high kick serves and lefty slice serves.
- Two-handed backhands can be hit with an open stance, whereas one-handers usually have to have a closed stance, which adds further steps (which is a problem at higher levels of play).
- Two-handed backhands are generally easier to develop; performing all the basic shots takes less advanced motor skills. Since the 70s, juniors have been increasingly taught two-handed backhands.

== Technique ==
Despite there being many different variations and styles, in general there are three different techniques to hit the one-handed backhand. The first is the slice, the oldest version of the single-handed backhand, which was popularised by many classic players such as Ken Rosewall and was still used up until the 1980s even in the women's tour, with many great women champions such as Steffi Graf having one of the lowest, most effective slice backhands. The slice backhand is considered the most simple and is the easiest to learn technique-wise. However, it is much harder to master. Unlike the slice on its own, the slice backhand refers to a player continuously using slice on their backhand as an ordinary shot, instead of for variety.

Most slice backhands are executed with a continental grip, identical to that of the backhand volley. The motion is also simple, and involves a cut at about 45 degrees to the bottom of the ball. The slice action closer to the bottom results in a higher and slower ball, typically used for lobs while a cut closer to the side of the ball results in a faster and lower ball. It is considered hard to be able to consistently pull off deep, low yet quick backhand slices and requires much practice and finesse. Such slice backhands often prevent opponents from getting under the ball easily and hitting easy winners. It also slows down the pace of the ball due to the back-spin on it, giving time for the player to anticipate and set up shots. For example, Steffi Graf often used her slice backhand to buy time for her to move around and hit inside-out forehands, her signature shot. It can also act as a good bluff to hit drop-shots or even fake drop-shots.

From the 1930s to the 1960s, the flat single-handed backhand was popularised by many players, most prominently and consistently by Rod Laver, Don Budge, Lew Hoad, Frank Kovacs, Ken Rosewall, Roy Emerson, Ellsworth Vines. He was one of the first players to use a flat single-handed backhand with a hint of top-spin. Although flat or top-spin shots were not rare at the time, they were not common shots and were used mainly for variety only, especially on the backhand side. These shots were generally faster-paced, but were considered harder to learn and execute. Even today, there are still many players who use the flat single-handed backhand, such as Stan Wawrinka and Roger Federer, although they have added more top-spin to cope with top-spin from other players as well. However, by the 1980s, the flat single-handed backhand was the norm for most single-handed backhand players, with marquee players such as John McEnroe, Pete Sampras, Boris Becker, Stefan Edberg, using it to great effectiveness. The advantages of the flat single-handed backhand include its speed, the angles it can produce and its depth. It is usually executed with an Eastern or Semi-Western grip, and involves a "throw-back" in which the racket is pulled across the player's body, sometimes with the help of the left hand, and a release to hit the ball followed by a much larger follow-through and finish as compared to the slice backhand.

While Björn Borg was considered to have had a two-handed backhand, he released his racket with one-hand, and was arguably the catalyst for the evolution and popularity of the two-handed backhand as well as the top-spin single-handed backhand. In the 1980s, when more players were using top-spin, single-handed backhand players found it more difficult to hit flat backhands due to the difficulty of neutralising the spin. Therefore, many players incorporated much more top-spin in their single-handed backhands, which was uncommon at that time. Current players who use a top-spin backhand include Nicolás Almagro and Grigor Dimitrov (Although he is also capable of hitting it flat). This helped single-handed backhand players cope with high spinning balls. The advantages of the top-spin single-handed backhand include consistency, placement, the angles it can produce as well as its ability to cope with high balls.

Single-backhand "flicks" also evolved due to the popularisation of the top-spin single-handed backhand. Unlike the flat single-handed backhand, top-spin single-handed backhands are almost always performed with the Semi-Western or even Western Grip. Richard Gasquet, who is considered to have one of the most elegant and efficient single-handed backhands, was known for his long, winding action on his backhand and his elegant follow-through. The top-spin single-handed backhand is probably the hardest to learn. It involves the player employing a Semi-Western or Western grip, and winding the racket around his body and, most importantly, bring it lower than the ball. Then, he has to hit the ball at the middle to bottom of the ball while winding his hand upwards and front of him, in a "window-wiper" action. A mistake that is often made in this execution is not bringing the racket low enough or not having a follow-through.

Many great players employ a combination of two or even three different styles. For example, Stan Wawrinka, who is said to have one of the most powerful single-handed backhands ever, can hit extremely flat backhands, but can also apply top-spin to them. Stefan Edberg and Boris Becker in the past, along with Roger Federer and Grigor Dimitrov are able to apply all three, using the slice, flat and top-spin backhands effectively. This variety makes it hard for the opponent to guess what kind of shot they are going to play.

== Great backhands ==
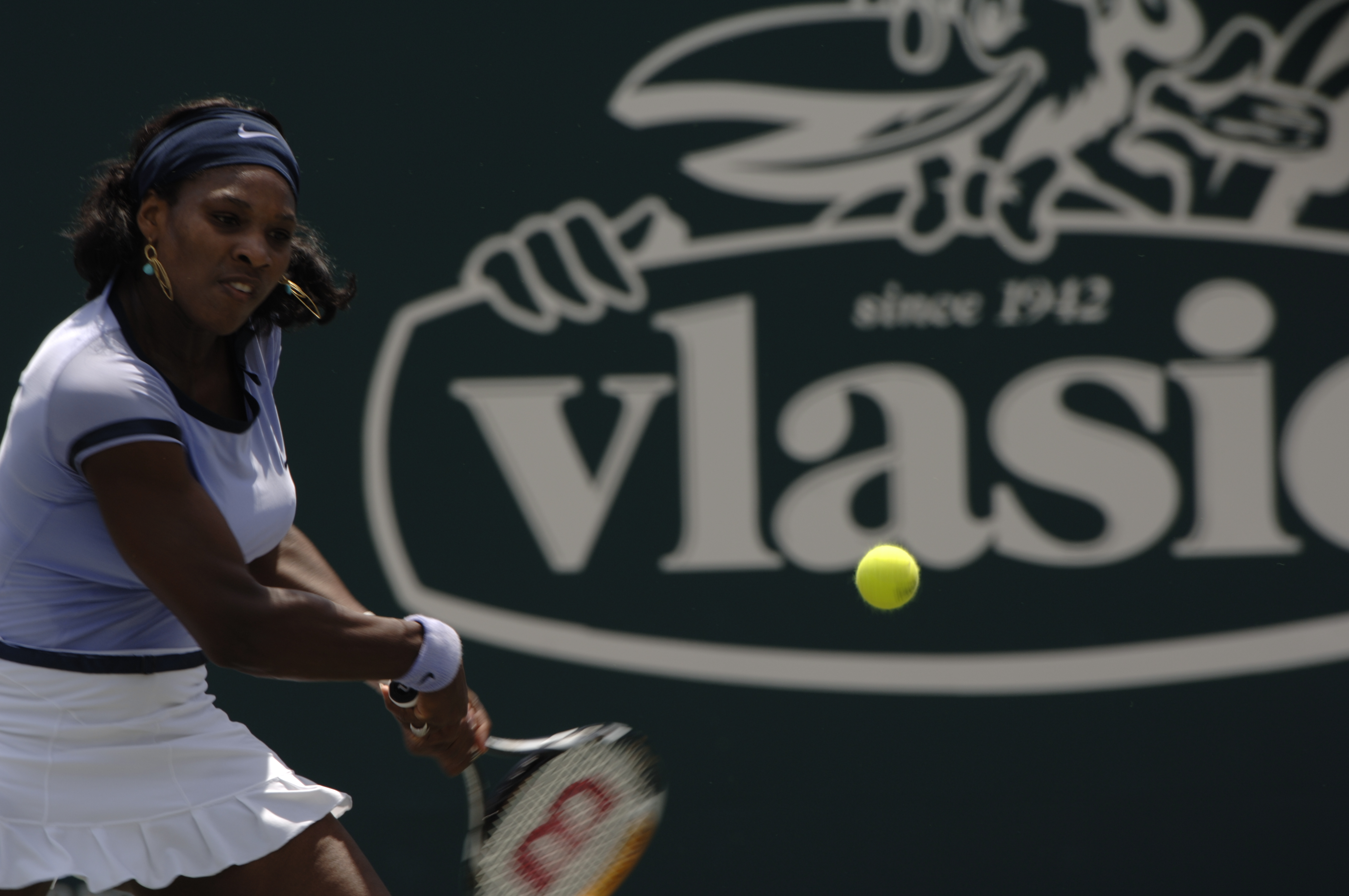
Serena Williams preparing to hit a backhand

The player long considered to have had the best backhand of all time, amateur and professional champion Don Budge, had a very powerful one-handed stroke in the 1930s and '40s that imparted topspin onto the ball. He used an Eastern grip, and some pictures show his thumb extended along the side of the racquet for greater support. Ken Rosewall, another amateur and professional champion noted for his one-handed backhand, also used a continental grip to hit a deadly accurate slice backhand with underspin throughout the 1950s and '60s. Connoisseurs of the game also rate Swede Henrik Sundström's one-handed backhand as technically magnificent and as powerful as many forehands, but Sundström's career was cut short by injury.

In his 1979 autobiography, Jack Kramer devotes a page to the best tennis strokes he had ever seen. He writes: "BACKHAND—Budge was best, with Kovacs, Rosewall and Connors in the next rank (although, as I've said, Connors' 'backhand' is really a two-handed forehand). Just in passing, the strangest competitive stroke was the backhand that belonged to Budge Patty. It was a weak shot, a little chip. But suddenly on match point, Patty had a fine, firm backhand. He was a helluva match player."

On the men's pro tour, dramatic changes have occurred since then. In the 1980s, many great players such as Stefan Edberg, Boris Becker, Ivan Lendl and John McEnroe were leading the charge with their one-handed versatile backhands. But a new wave of players, such as Jimmy Connors, Björn Borg, Mats Wilander and Miloslav Mečíř, started to show the world that two-handed backhands could also offer major advantages. Players could now increase the speed and control of their two-hander in key defensive shots, such as returns, passing shots and lobs. Since then, many players followed this trend. Among the main ones are Andre Agassi, Yevgeny Kafelnikov, Marcelo Ríos, Marat Safin, David Nalbandian (owning the fastest recorded backhand at 110 mph (180 km/h)), Novak Djokovic, Andy Murray, Kei Nishikori.

However, the one-handed backhand is still used effectively by some players such as Richard Gasquet, Stan Wawrinka, Dominic Thiem, Philipp Kohlschreiber, Stefanos Tsitsipas, Grigor Dimitrov, Gastón Gaudio, Olivier Rochus, Joachim Johansson, Roger Federer.

On the women's tour, Justine Henin's backhand was considered on par with the men's, with John McEnroe saying "Justine Henin has the best single-handed backhand in both the men's and women's game. Henin's backhand is described as a deadly weapon which is spontaneous, accurate and powerful. She can hit drop shots with her deadly back hand." Many different styles of backhand arose in the late 1980s, including Steffi Graf's exceptional one-handed sliced backhand, and Monica Seles' two-handed backhand, characterized by its rapidity of execution. WTA players who possessed one-handed backhands include Steffi Graf, Conchita Martínez, Jana Novotná, Eleni Daniilidou, Amélie Mauresmo, and Diane Parry.

The two-handed backhand began to gain popularity over the one-handed backhand in the 1990s (even though there had been great tennis champions whose backhand was two-handed, Chris Evert being an example). Some of the greatest two-handed backhands of the modern game include Serena Williams, Martina Hingis, Venus Williams, Maria Sharapova, Li Na, Nicole Vaidišová, Elina Svitolina, Petra Kvitová, Victoria Azarenka, and Jeļena Ostapenko. The Williams sisters and Sharapova possess double-handed backhands that are considered the best and most powerful on tour. They can damage their opponents from any corner of the court with their backhands, being able to create angles that are much more difficult to create with a one-handed backhand. Other female players are known for their use of the slice backhand. Female players known for their proficiency with this shot include Billie Jean King, Margaret Court, Virginia Wade, Martina Navratilova, Steffi Graf, Jana Novotná, Nathalie Tauziat, Justine Henin, Amélie Mauresmo, Svetlana Kuznetsova, Samantha Stosur and Francesca Schiavone.

Some of the greatest rivalries in tennis history are symbolized by two different backhand styles. These include the Evert–Navratilova rivalry of the 1980s with Martina Navratilova's smooth one-handed sliced backhand versus Chris Evert's perfectly controlled two-handed backhand, Borg-McEnroe rivalry of the same period featuring Björn Borg's two-handed backhand against John McEnroe's one-handed backhand, and the contemporary Federer-Nadal rivalry with Roger Federer's effortless one-handed backhand with a lot of topspin or backspin, versus Rafael Nadal's powerful, flatter two-handed backhand.

== See also ==
- Glossary of tennis terms
- Tennis shots
