= Grip (badminton) =

In badminton, a grip is a way of holding the racket in order to hit shots during a match. The most commonly used grip is the orthodox forehand grip. Most players change grips during a rally depending on whether it is a forehand or backhand shot. A grip is also the wrapping around the handle of the racket. There are many types and varieties of grips; the texture, thickness, color, material and surface (flat or waved) are all factors that make grips unique.

== Forehand grip ==
In order to understand the grips, it is important to know that the handle of a racquet always consists of 8 sides, or in other words, has an octagonal shape. A square shape would hurt the hand, while a round shape would not give enough friction to gain a firm grip. The eight sides of the handle are called bevels. The bevels can be numbered from 1 to 8; with the racquet surface perpendicular to the ground, the bevels are numbered from the top anti-clockwise. So bevel 1 would be the narrow bevel at the 'North' position, bevel 2 would be the diagonal bevel at the 'Northwest' position, etc.

The badminton handle should be held as if the player were lightly shaking hands with it. For right handed players, the right bottom side of the thumb should be touching the 3rd bevel while the left side of the index finger should be resting on the 7th level. The index finger rests on the 7th bevel above the adjacent location of the thumb on the 3rd level. The finger is shaped like a hook and holds onto the handle near the top section. The other fingers are wrapped around the lower sections of the handle.

== Backhand grip ==
The backhand grip, also known as the thumb grip, is similar to the forehand grip except the complete bottom of the thumb is in contact with the 3rd bevel and the index finger is lowered down to a position below the thumb.

== Benefits and limitations of grip positions ==
Here is a table contrasting the benefits and limitations of using certain grips in certain situations.

Benefits and Limitations of Grip Positions
Benefits	Limitations
Using the forehand grip is beneficial as it reduces strain on the wrist and arm.	Using the backhand grip during a backhand shot increases power as the thumb provides substantial energy to the racquet.
More powerful smashes	Clears are too short, smashes are weak
More accurate net shots and serves	Limited choice for the direction of your strokes
Stronger smash defense, ready to return smash on both sides	Difficulty coping when opponents hit towards your body
Deceptive Strokes	Obvious stokes that your opponent can predict

== Types of grips ==
=== Underlying Grip (undergrip) ===
The underlying grip or the undergrip, is a layer of thin wrapping of synthetic leather that is wrapped around the bare handle of the racquet. All badminton racquets come with the undergrip and it is recommended that it is not removed. It is advised for players to apply an overgrip over the undergrip for normal use/play.

=== Waved ===
The waved badminton grip is a type of grip that has foam strips in the center of the grip wrap so that after the grip is applied, there will be 'grooves' on the grip that can help increase friction and comfort when holding the racquet. The only slight disadvantage of waved grips is that is slightly heavier than flat grips due to the excess foam for the grooves.

=== Flat ===
The Eastern Backhand grip is obtained when placing the hand such that the base knuckle of the index finger and heel of the hand are right on the 1st bevel. This is essentially the same as the Western forehand grip and allows for significant spin and control.

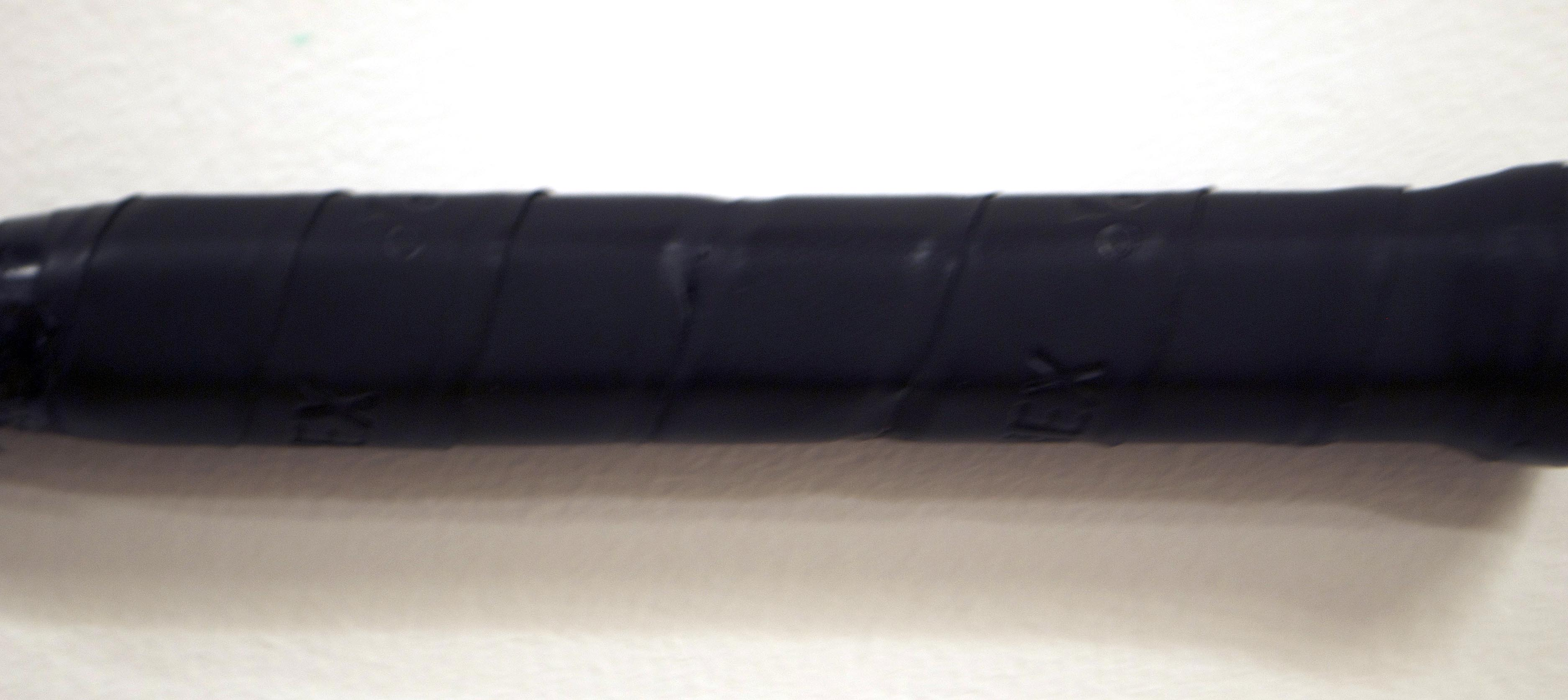
A flat Badminton racquet grip

== Companies that sell grips ==
- Yonex
- Li-Ning

== Grip sizes ==
- G1
- G2
- G3
- G4
- G5
