= Overgrip =

Padded tape wrapped around a racquet handle

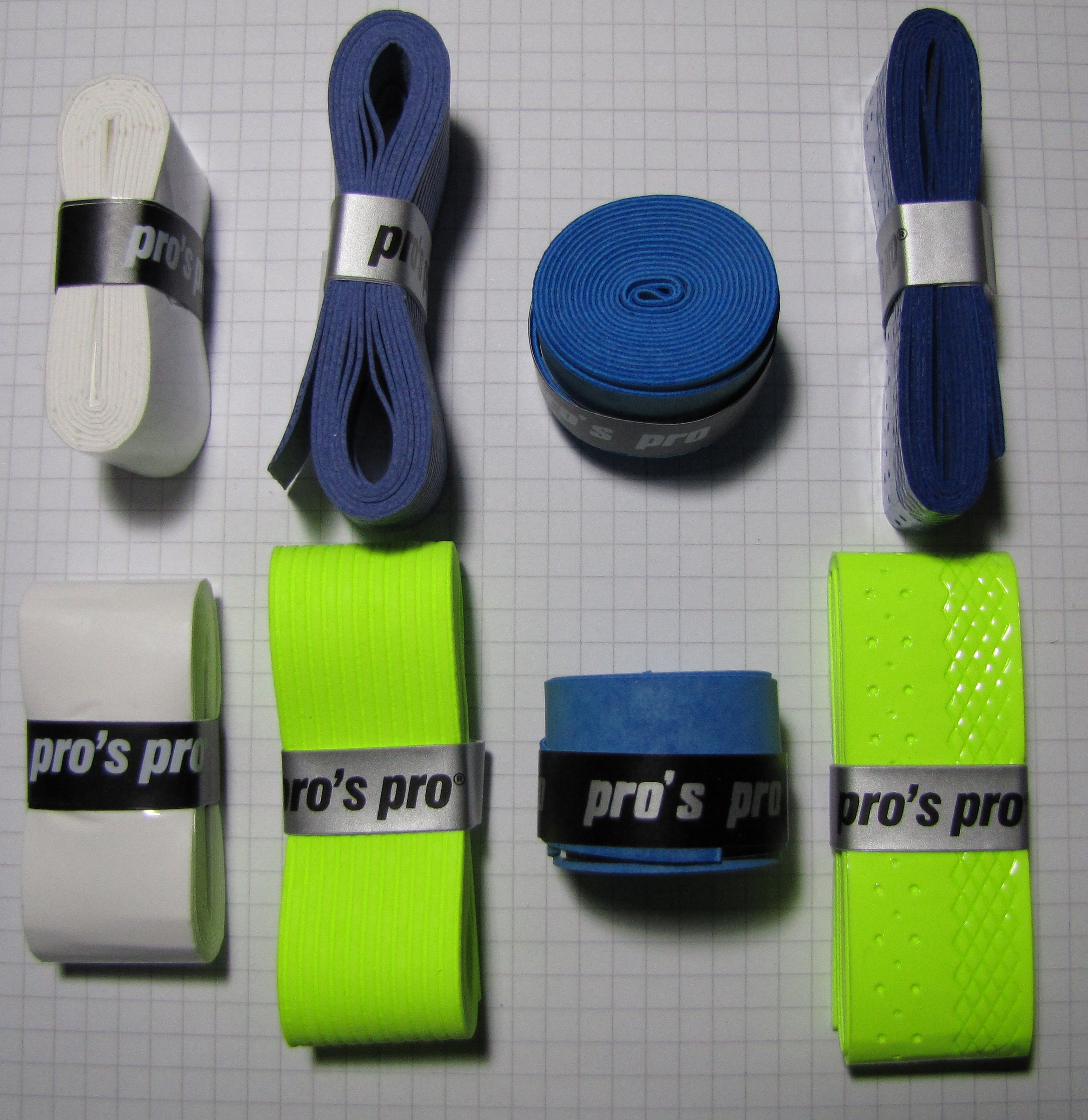
Different overgrips

An overgrip (also known as an overwrap) is a soft, padded, clothlike tape wrapped around the grip of a racquet, and are commonly used in the sport of tennis, badminton, squash, and pickleball. The purposes of an overgrip include (but are not limited to) increasing the racquet handle's circumference, customizing the texture and feel of the handle, adding padding/cushioning for more comfort, or for cosmetic purposes (many overgrips have multiple color and pattern options). There are generally two categories of overgrips: Tacky grips help increase the tackiness (stickiness) of the racquet handle to allow for a better grip and minimize slipping, while absorbent overgrips are designed to absorb the sweat that comes off of a player's palms.

Some popular Overgrip brands are: Tourna Grip, Wilson, Babolat, Yonex, Head, Prince, Dunlop, Tecnifibre, Völkl, ProKennex, Li-Ning, Gamma, Gosen, Solinco, Kimony, Karakal, and Pro's Pro.

Overgrips are generally applied from the bottom of the handle, or 'butt cap', and up towards the throat (section between handle and head) of the racquet. It is wrapped around the handle in a diagonal fashion, overlapping by approximately 1/6 inch. If the overgrip exceeds the length of the handle and there is extra grip past the throat, it is advised to cut the excess at an angle, and use grip finishing tape to keep it from unraveling.

Overgrips can be used on any kind of racquet including: tennis, badminton, squash, racquetball, platform tennis, table tennis, and other variations of the different racquet sports. They can also be used for other sporting equipment, such as baseball bats, golf clubs, hockey sticks, fishing rods, and more.

The type of overgrip used can significantly impact the amount of slippage.

== See also ==
Racquet
