= Forehand =

Tennis shot

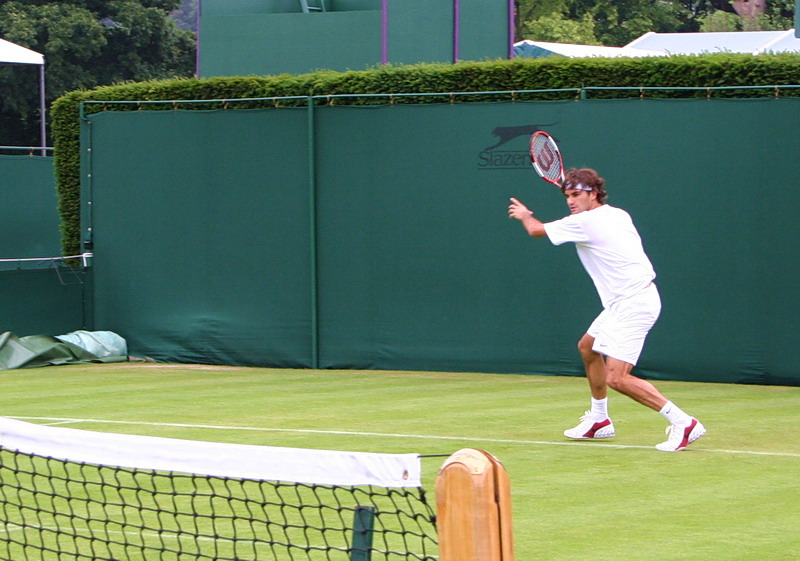
Roger Federer prepares to hit a forehand.

The forehand is a shot used in most racket sports, such as tennis, table tennis and pickleball, where the palm of the hand precedes the back of the hand when swinging the racket. In tennis, except in the context of the phrase forehand volley, the term refers to a type of groundstroke—a stroke in which the ball has bounced before it is struck. It contrasts with the backhand, the other type of groundstroke. For a right-handed player, the forehand is a stroke that begins on the right side of the body, continues across the body as contact is made with the ball, and ends on the left side of the body. It is considered the easiest shot to master, perhaps because it is the most natural stroke. Beginners and advanced players often have better forehands than any other shots and use it as a weapon.

Most forehands are hit with topspin because it helps keep the ball from landing outside the court. On some occasions, such as an approach shot, a player can opt to hit with backspin, which can also be called a 'slice'.

Players with great forehands often build their main strategy around it. They set up a point until they have a good chance of striking a powerful forehand to win the point. A well-known tactic is to run around a ball on their backhand side in order to hit a forehand cross-court, called the inside-out forehand.

== Grips ==
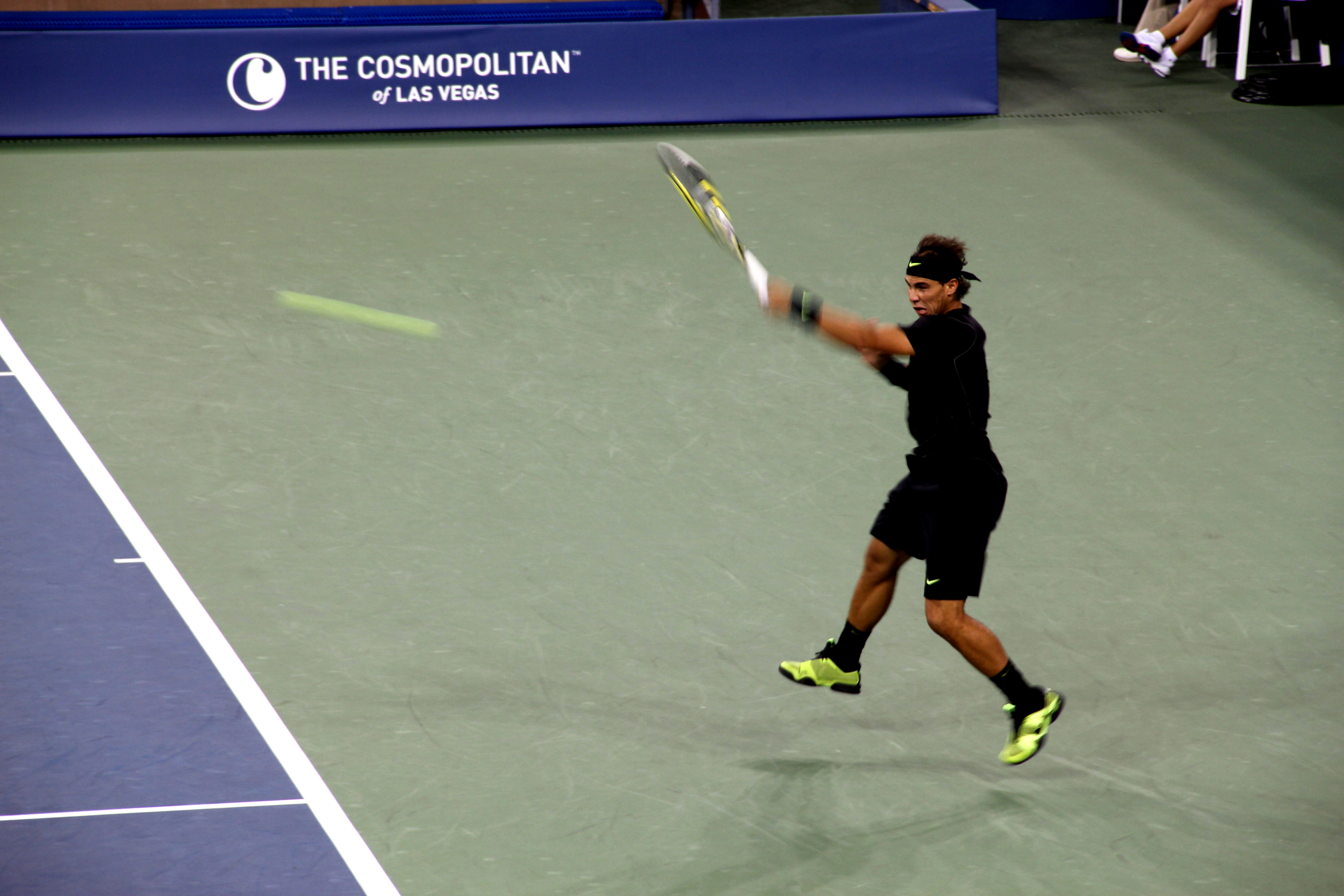
Moment after Rafael Nadal hitting a left-handed forehand at the 2010 US Open.

There are four main grips for executing the forehand and their popularity has fluctuated over the years. They are the western, the semi-western, the eastern, and the continental. Some rarer grips include extreme-western or Hawaiian.

=== Western ===
The western was widely used in the first two decades of the 20th century. For a number of years the small, apparently frail 1920s player Bill Johnston was considered by some to have had the best forehand of all time, a stroke that he hit shoulder-high using a western grip. Few top players used the western grip after the 1920s, as a number of them moved to the eastern and continental, but in the latter part of the 20th century, as shot-making techniques and equipment changed radically, the western forehand made a comeback and is now used by a number of modern players. Some consider it to be an extreme or radical grip, however. The maximum amount of topspin can be generated with this grip. Prominent exponents of the western grip include Sébastien Grosjean, Kei Nishikori, Nadia Petrova, Lleyton Hewitt, Sania Mirza, Robin Söderling, Samantha Stosur, Jack Sock, and Andrea Petkovic.

=== Extreme-Western, "Hawaiian" ===
The extreme-western or Hawaiian grip is a tennis grip where the player places their knuckle past the 5th bevel on the tennis racket. It's considered by some to be too extreme for tennis, as the optimal strike zone for this grip is high up and is suitable only for pure spin hitting. Indeed; flattening out a shot at that height is near impossible due to wrist constrictions, and so this grip is suited only for clay court specialists. However, some players are able to take advantage of this grip's massive spin generation due to their defensive play style or height, which allow them to hit the strike zone often. An example would be Florian Mayer. Other players that employ this grip are Nick Kyrgios and Karen Khachanov. On the WTA tour, Anna-Lena Grönefeld and Amélie Mauresmo were well known for using the Hawaiian grip. The Extreme-Western is also known for causing arm and wrist problems if employed incorrectly. Currently, Iga Świątek employs the Hawaiian grip on the WTA tour, allowing her to generate levels of topspin comparable to Rafael Nadal on her forehand.

=== Semi-Western ===
The semi-western grip is also widely used today, and falls in between the western and the eastern. It is popular with players who want to hit heavy topspin, but still want to be able to flatten out the ball for finishing shots. It is currently the most popular forehand grip among ATP and WTA pros, with multiple top players employing this grip on their forehand. It can be further modified to be closer to a semi-eastern grip, or more to a full-western grip depending on the player's profile and playing style. A number of the world's current players use this grip, such as Rafael Nadal, Novak Djokovic, Andy Murray, David Ferrer, Jo-Wilfried Tsonga, Venus and Serena Williams, Ana Ivanović, Maria Sharapova, and multiple other professional tennis players in today's modern game.

=== Eastern ===
The eastern grip widely replaced the western in the 1920s and thereafter was used by such World No. 1 players as Ellsworth Vines, Don Budge, and Jack Kramer, all of whom were considered to have powerful forehands. A number of beginners start with the eastern grip because of its comfortable feel. It is often described as shaking hands with the racquet. Forehands hit with the eastern can have either topspin or backspin, as the gripping hand is on the same plane as the racquet, and can thus be tilted up for topspin or down for backspin rather easily. Although rarer on the professional tour as it makes hitting topspin somewhat difficult, there are some notable players who use the eastern grip to great effect. Juan Martín del Potro is an excellent example of an eastern forehand user. Roger Federer is often noted as having an eastern grip, although his forehand lies somewhere in between semi-western and eastern. His power and versatility on the forehand side are commonly attributed to this twist on the forehand grip. WTA players who have utilised the eastern grip include Steffi Graf, Justine Henin, Anna Kournikova, Petra Kvitová, Angelique Kerber, and Lindsay Davenport.

=== Continental ===
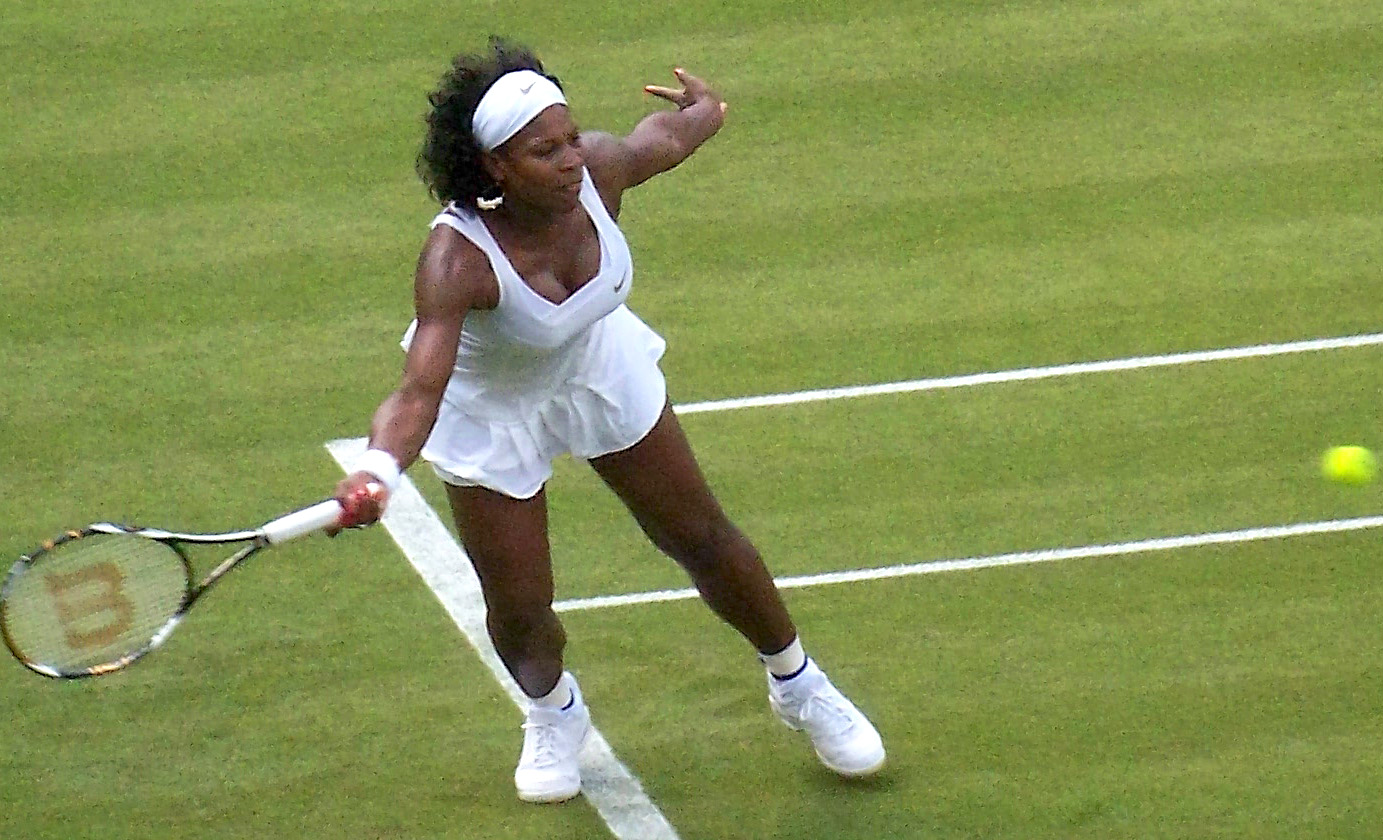
Serena Williams preparing to hit a forehand.

The continental grip was popular with a number of Europeans of the 1920s and 1930s and with a number of Australians of the 1940s and 1950s. The continental has the advantage of being used for all strokes: serves, volleys, forehands, and backhands, without having to be shifted in the player's hand, as is the case with all the other grips. It is particularly well-suited for hitting low balls — "taking the ball on the rise" — but is generally considered inferior for most forehands. It is rare for a modern professional player to utilize a "continental" grip, owing to the difficulty of topspin generation and poor ability to hit balls above the strike-zone, crucial in today's heavy topspin game. Richard Gasquet is an example of a player who uses the "continental" forehand, but he generally switches his grip over to a semi-western during his takeback process. Fred Perry, the great English player of the 1930s and 1940s was notable for his snap forehand using the continental grip and taking the ball on the rise.

=== Two-handed forehand ===
No matter which grip is used, most forehands are generally executed with one hand holding the racquet, but there have been fine players with two-handed forehands. In the 1940s and 50s the Ecuadorian/American player Pancho Segura used a two-handed forehand with devastating effect against larger, more powerful players. His frequent adversary and even greater player Jack Kramer has called it the single finest shot in the history of tennis. Ellsworth Vines, another great player, agreed. He wrote: "Two-handed forehand is most outstanding stroke in game's history; unbeatable unless opponent could avoid it."

Monica Seles also used a two-handed forehand effectively, with 53 career titles that included 9 Grand Slam titles. Marion Bartoli won Wimbledon in 2013 with a two-handed forehand. Unusually, both players placed their dominant hand at the base of the racquet, resulting in a cross-handed stroke. Fabrice Santoro, who was ranked as high as 17 in the world, used a two-handed forehand.

Among current players Peng Shuai, Ayumi Morita, Yan Zi, and Aiko Nakamura employ two-handed forehands. Peng's forehand is also cross-handed.

Some players will use a two-handed forehand when they need a sure-fire in. The constricted movement will generally generate less power, but more racket head control.

== Evolution ==
The classical forehand where a player hit through the ball and finished their follow-through above the shoulder was the dominant forehand usage for most of tennis history. Players as recent as Pete Sampras and Andre Agassi used the classical forehand. With recent tennis racquet technology improvements, generating power has increasingly become easier and hence having more control has become an emphasis for current professional tennis players. This has resulted in the pro players now using a windshield wiper forehand where the follow-through ends up with the racquet ending across the body rather than over the shoulder. This enables more top spin to be imparted to the ball, thus controlling the extra power generated while still keeping the ball in court. Most pro players now use the windshield wiper forehand, with Rafael Nadal, Roger Federer and Novak Djokovic among other pro tennis players all employing the windshield wiper forehand.

== Notable forehands ==
In his 1979 autobiography Jack Kramer, who had a great forehand himself, devotes a page to the best tennis strokes he had ever seen. He wrote: "FOREHAND—Segura was best, then Perry, followed by Tilden and Vines (although I never saw Big Bill's till he was in his forties). Of the moderns, Năstase's forehand is a superb one, especially on the run.".

At a professional event in 1951, the forehand drives of a number of players were electronically measured. Pancho Gonzales hit the fastest, at 112.88 mph, followed by Jack Kramer at 107.8 and Welby Van Horn at 104.

In the 1980s, Ivan Lendl was famous for the smoothness of his forehand and his ability to strike the ball hard, no matter where he was standing on the court.

Roger Federer has been noted to have one of the greatest forehands in history, described as a "great liquid whip" by David Foster Wallace.

And amongst the female players, the following were well-known for their forehand

- Marita Redondo, by vote of women playing pros in 1975 named the best Forehand in women's tennis
- Steffi Graf, one of whose nicknames was "Fräulein Forehand"

== See also ==
- Glossary of tennis terms
- Tennis shots

== Sources ==
- The Game, My 40 Years in Tennis (1979), Jack Kramer with Frank Deford (ISBN 0-399-12336-9)
- The History of Professional Tennis (2003), Joe McCauley
