= Glossary of pickleball =

This glossary provides definitions and context for terminology related to, and jargon specific to, the sport of pickleball. Words or phrases in italics can be found on the list in their respective alphabetic sections.

== 0–9 ==
0–0
See Zero–Zero
0–0–2 or 0–0–start
See Zero–Zero–Two.
20 by 44
A pickleball court. Pickleball courts measure 20 feet (6.1 m) by 44 feet (13 m).

== A ==
Ace
Any serve that is not returned by the receiver, or, more specifically, a serve that the receiver's paddle never touches. The term, originally used in tennis, has been attributed to American sportswriter Allison Danzig.
APP or APP Tour
See Association of Pickleball Players
Approach shot
A shot executed while moving from the backcourt towards the non-volley line.
Around-the-post (ATP)
A legal shot that travels outside the net posts; its trajectory may be above or below the height of the net.
Association of Pickleball Players
An American amateur and pro pickleball tour sanctioned by USA Pickleball. Originally named the Association of Pickleball Professionals, when it was formed in 2019, the organization changed its name in 2023 to better reflect its support for both amateur and professional players.
At the net
A player positioned at the non-volley line; considered a strategically dominant position.
Attackable ball or Attackable shot
A ball returned over the net in a way that allows the receiving side to make a strategic offensive shot. This can mean the ball was hit high and deep enough to allow their opponent to return a targeted aggressive volley from outside the non-volley zone, or the ball has enough height after the bounce to permit a targeted aggressive groundstroke.

== B ==
Backcourt
The area of the court located near the baseline.
Backhand shot
A shot made with the palm of the hand facing away from the net. For a right-handed player, a backhand shot would be made on their left side. The reverse can be said for a left-handed player. Contrast with Forehand shot.
Backspin
See Spin.
Backswing
The backward movement of the paddle in advance of striking the ball.
Bagel
A shutout game ending when one team earned no points. In a standard pickleball game, an 11-0 ending score.
Baker
See Shake & bake.
Bainbridge Cup
An international pickleball competition organized by the International Pickleball Federation, or the trophy awarded at the competition.
Bainbridge Island
An island in the state of Washington, United States, where the sport of pickleball was invented at the home of Joel Pritchard.
Ball! or Ball on!
A call made to alert all players when an errant ball is on the court, usually a ball from another court. For safety, all play should immediately stop and the serve started over once the court is clear.
Ball type
Pickleballs come in two basic types, "indoor" or "outdoor", but some may be labeled "hybrid" with features that fall between the two. Rules permit any USAP approved ball to be used in indoor or outdoor matches.

- Hybrid ball: A pickleball with features somewhere between an indoor ball and an outdoor ball.
- Indoor ball: A pickleball designed primarily for indoor play. Characteristics of an indoor ball include fewer holes, each with a larger diameter, less weight, and softer less durable plastic. The design provides better performance where wind is not a factor, and the court is smooth, such as a wood floor.
- Outdoor ball: A pickleball designed primarily for outdoor play. Characteristics of an outdoor ball include more holes, each with a smaller diameter, more weight, and harder more durable plastic. The design provides better performance in wind and more durability for rough outdoor courts.

Banger
A player that hits mostly powerful drive shots.
Baselines
The lines parallel to the net at the back of the pickleball court 22 feet (6.7 m) from the net.
Bash
A hard shot that hits the top of the net (i.e. the tape) and then lands in play on the opponent's side of the court. A bash is typically unintentional and very difficult to return as the ball changes speed and/or direction due to contact with the net.
Bert
In doubles, a poach shot where a player crosses in front of their partner to execute an erne on their partner's side of the court.
Bevel
One of the eight sides of a standard eight-sided racket handle. See Grip (tennis) for how each bevel is referenced and numbered.
Block shot or Blocking
A backhanded defensive shot with little or no backswing intended to slow the ball and drop it in the opponent’s non-volley zone; used in response to a body shot.
Body shot, Body bag, or Tag
A shot that hits the body of an opposing player, often intentionally, thereby winning the point. Care should be taken to avoid the head, neck or face. (Also see Nasty Nelson.)
Bounce it!
In doubles, a call made by one partner to the other instructing them to allow the ball to bounce before striking the ball. Called when a player thinks the ball may land out of bounds.

== C ==
Carry
Hitting the ball in such a way that it does not bounce away from the paddle but tends to be carried along on the face of the paddle. This is a fault.
Centerline
The line bisecting the service courts that extends from the non-volley line to the baseline.
Chainsaw serve
A serve that starts by swiping, brushing or rolling the ball against the paddle before tossing the ball in preparation for striking the ball, thereby imparting spin on the ball, then striking the ball with a topspin stroke imparting even more spin. The serve was popularized by Zane Navratil and is sometimes referred to as the Zane Navratil serve. As of 2022 the serve is no longer allowed per USAP rules, but still permitted in unsanctioned PPA pro games.
Champion or Championship
The final winner in a tournament bracket.
Championship point
See Game point
Chicken wing
An awkward defensive shot made with the paddle arm bent and the elbow extended up and away from the body. It also can refer to the shoulder and armpit area, on the paddle side of a player's body, that when targeted can force the player to make a chicken wing defensive shot.
Chip shot
See Chop.
Chop, Chip, Cut, or Slice shot
Striking the ball using a slightly open faced paddle while moving the paddle in a downward undercutting motion to impart backspin on the ball.
Claw
When an opponent hits the ball with intense backspin that it hits the opposite side of the court, it bounces back to the opponent’s side. To keep the ball in play, the player must reach over the net to tap the ball. If the player doesn’t touch the ball, the opponents win that play. Most players will reach over the net and hit the ball forward potentially keeping the ball in play for the opponent to hit back. The best strategy is to reach over the net in a “claw” like manner and hit the ball INTO the net causing the ball to drop on the opponent’s side making it impossible for the opponents to play the point.
Closed face
Tilting the paddle face down when striking the ball with the upper edge of the racket angled forward. (See also Flat face and Open face)
Coaching
Any communication to a player from a non-player. Coaching is not allowed while a game is in progress, except during time-outs and in-between games.
Coed pickleball
Pickleball competitions where men and women compete without any distinctions related to sex.
Continental grip or Hammer grip
Grasping the paddle handle so that the index finger and thumb form a "V" in line with the edge of the paddle; similar to picking up a hammer. (See also Grip)
Corkspin
See Spin.
Cough Drop
A shot where the ball hits the top of the net and falls back on the player’s side that hit the ball. Opposite term is lemon drop.
Crosscourt
The opponent's half of the court that is diagonally opposite the player striking the ball.
Crush & rush
See Shake & bake.
Cut shot
See Chop.

== D ==
Dead ball
A ball that is no longer in play, or any action that stops play. A dead ball occurs whenever one of the following occur; a fault is committed, the ball strikes a permanent object, or a hindrance is called.
Dillbreaker
See Dreambreaker.
Dink or Dink shot
A soft return shot made at, in, or near the non-volley zone, after the ball has bounced, that just clears the net and drops into the opponent's non-volley zone.
Dink rally
A series of slow dink shots where each side attempts to deny their opponent an attackable ball.
Dink volley
A soft return shot made at or near the non-volley line, prior to the ball bouncing, that just clears the net and drops into the opponent's non-volley zone.
Dinker
A pickleball player that is exceptionally good at dinking.
Disguise
See Misdirection.
Double-bounce rule
See Two-bounce rule.
Double hit
Hitting the ball twice with the paddle before the ball is returned. A valid play as long as the hits are both performed as part of one continuous stroke. Double hit might also refer to hitting the ball twice, involving one player or both players on a team, but using two separate strokes. This is a fault.
Doubles
Pickleball matches having two players per side. (Contrast to Singles)

- Coed doubles: A match where the four doubles players may be any combination of male and female players. There is no requirement with respect to sex.
- Mixed doubles: Each side must have one male player and one female player.
- Gender doubles: All four doubles players must be the same sex.
  - Men's doubles: All four doubles players must be male.
  - Women's doubles: All four doubles players must be female.

DreamBreaker or Dillbreaker
A tie-breaking singles game used in MLP team format competitions. If two teams remain tied after four games of doubles, a dreambreaker singles game is played to decide the match. After every four rallies, the individuals playing on both teams are rotated.
Dreamland
See DUPR.
Drive shot
A powerful groundstroke or volley hit fast and low over the net to the opponent's backcourt.
Drop serve
See Serve.
Drop or Drop shot
A soft return shot made from the back court or mid court, after the ball has bounced, that lands in or near the opponent's non-volley zone.
Drop volley
A soft return shot made from the back court or mid court, prior to the ball bouncing, that lands in or near the opponent's non-volley zone.
DUPR or Dynamic Universal Pickleball Rating
A pickleball player rating system ranging from 2.0 to 8.0. Developed by Steve Kuhn at his Dreamland family amusement center in Austin, Texas. DUPR was originally called the Dreamland Universal Pickleball Rating.

== E ==
Eastern grip or Handshake grip
Grasping the paddle handle so that the index finger and thumb form a "V" in line with the second bevel on the paddle handle; an angle similar to shaking hands with someone. (See also Grip)
Erne
A volley hit near the net by a player positioned outside the court or in the process of leaping outside the court. A legally executed erne shot allows a player to hit the ball closer to the net without stepping in the non-volley zone. Named for Erne Perry, the first person credited with using the shot in mainstream competitive play.
Even service court
See Service court.
Every. Pickle. Point. Counts.
A scoring system used in some team format pickleball tournaments where points won in each game are cumulative, with additional points added based on games won.

== F ==
Fault
An infringement of the rules that ends a rally and results in a dead ball.
First server, First serve
In doubles; the first team member to serve the ball after a side–out. If a side-out occurs when the team's score is even, the team's starting server will be the first server, otherwise the non-starting server will be the first server. (See also Starting server)
Flat face
Keeping the paddle face parallel with the plane of the net when striking the ball without angling the racket up or down. (See also Closed face and Open face)
Foot fault
A foot fault can occur when serving or when volleying.

- When serving; failure to keep both feet behind the baseline, with at least one foot in contact with the ground or floor, when the paddle contacts the ball.
- When vollying; stepping on or into the non-volley zone, including any line around the non-volley zone, while volleying a ball, or when carried into the NVZ by momentum after volleying the ball.

Forehand shot
A shot made with the palm of the hand facing towards the net. For a right-handed player, a forehand shot would be made on their right side. The reverse can be said for a left-handed player. Contrast with Backhand shot.
Freeze or Freezing
(See Score freezing)
Frying pan grip
See Western grip.
Full stack
See Stacking

== G ==
Game
A series of rallies where each side tries to earn points and reach the predetermined game-winning number of points first. Official rules set the game-winning number of points at 11, but tournament directors sometimes set that game-winning number of points at 15, 21, or higher. Unless otherwise specified by the tournament director, a player, or team, must win a game by two points, therefore, even if the predetermined game-winning number of points is set at 11, the final winning total could climb indefinitely higher, if the two sides alternate winning points but stay within one point of each other.
Game point
A juncture during a game when a player, or team, only needs to win the next rally to win the game, i. e. the game-winning point. If a game point win would also determine the match, or championship, it may be referred to as a match point or championship point. If the game-winning point would end the game with the other side having zero points, it may be referred to as a pickle point.
Gender doubles
See Doubles.
Golden pickle
See Pickle.
Grip
May refer to:

- The manner a player grasps the paddle handle. Common grip styles include the Continental grip, Eastern grip and the Western grip. For details regarding grip styles see Grip (tennis).
- The material covering the handle of the paddle. Some factors considered when choosing a grip material include; cushioning, breathability, tackiness, thickness and durability. See also Overgrip.
- The handle of the pickleball paddel.

Groundstroke or Ground stroke
A ball that is struck after it bounces.

== H ==
Half stack
See Stacking
Half Volley
A ground stroke that is struck low to the ground immediately after the ball bounces.
Hammer grip
See Continental grip.
Hand signal(s)
A non-verbal physical hand gesture used to communicate during the game. Hand signals might be used by line judges or players. Common hand signals include:

- Hand covering eyes: A line judge's signal that they are unable to make a call because their view of the ball was obscured.
- Pointing the index finger up or to the side: A call that the ball was out. The finger might be pointing up or in the direction the ball was out.
- Palm facing down or index finger pointing down: A call that the ball was in.
- Open palm behind the back: A signal to the receiver, from the receiver's partner, to switch sides after the return.
- Closed fist behind the back: A signal to the receiver, from the receiver's partner, to not switch sides after the return.
- Forming the letter "T" with the hands or one hand and a paddle: Used by a player to signal a time out to the umpire and other team.

Handle
The part of the racket that is used to grip the paddle.
Handle bevel
See Bevel.
Handshake grip
See Eastern grip.
Hinder or Hindrance
An interference of play by something outside of the game, such as an errant ball or a person crossing the court. Hinders result in a dead ball, and the point is replayed. A dead ball occurs as soon as a hinder is called by either side. If it is subsequently determined that the hinder call was invalid, then the point is not replayed, and the side calling the hinder loses the point.
Hit-the-post or HTP
See Into-the-post.

== I ==
I-formation
In doubles; a player positioning strategy used by the serving team, where the non-serving player starts at the non-volley line. The intent is to confuse the receiving team while allowing the serving side to preposition one player at the net, putting pressure on the receiving side to make a quality fourth shot. The strategy can be risky and requires the non-serving player to stay low and out of the ball's flight pattern. The serving team must wait for the return ball to bounce, which means the server must cover the entire width of the court on the third shot, if their partner is already up at the non-volley line. The non-serving partner can be intentionally targeted by the receiving side forcing a fault for the serving side.
IFP
See International Pickleball Federation.
In
A line call made when a ball lands within or on the court lines, or in the case of a serve, within the service court. Sometimes indicated with a hand signal by using a flat palm facing down or pointing the index finger down.
Incorrect position
When the ball is served from the wrong serving area. As of 2024 this is no longer a fault.
Incorrect receiver
In doubles; when the wrong receiving team member returns the serve. As of 2024 this is no longer a fault.
Incorrect server
In doubles; when the wrong serving team member serves the ball. As of 2024 this is no longer a fault.
Indoor ball
See Ball type.
Interference
See Hinder.
International Federation of Pickleball (IFP)
See International Pickleball Federation.
International Pickleball Federation (IPF)
A federation of national pickleball organizations. Established in 2010 to serve as the world governing body for the sport of pickleball. Originally named the International Federation of Pickleball (IFP).
Into-the-post or ITP
A shot that results in the ball hitting the post, usually occurring when attempting an Around-the-post shot.
IPF
See International Pickleball Federation.

== J ==
Joey
Hitting an ATP shot directly back at the opponent that made the ATP shot. Named for Joe Valenti.

== K ==
King of the Court or Queen of the Court
A pickleball competition format, either doubles or singles, where one side is designated the "king of the court" or "queen of the court", and the other side is designated the "challenger". A series of rotating challengers play a set number of points against the king. If the challenger wins, the challenger becomes the new king of the court, and the previous king moves to the back of the challenger line. Variations of the competition format may involve multiple courts where one court is designated the king's court and one the jester's court, with any number of courts in between. Winners of each game move up in ranking towards the king's court, losers of each game move down in ranking towards the jester's court.
Kitchen
See Non-volley zone.

== L ==
Left service court
See Service court.
Lemon drop
A shot where the ball hits the top of the net and dribbles down on the opponent’s side.
Let serve
When a served ball hits the net, but still lands in the correct service court. A valid serve in USAP rules.
Line call
The determination whether a ball has landed inside or outside the court lines, or in the case of the serve, inside or outside the service court. Players are responsible for making good-faith line calls on their side of the net. When there is any uncertainty, or if the two players on a doubles team make different calls, the call should be made in favor of their opponent. The point where the ball contacts the ground determines whether a ball is in or out. Although the sphere of the ball might overlap the line when viewed from above, due to the rigidity of the ball the contact point might remain outside the lines, however, an out call should not be made unless space can be clearly seen between the line and the contact point. In refereed matches, an appeal to overrule the call may be made to the referee, but referees will only overrule the out call if they were able to clearly see the ball was in.
Lob shot
Hitting the ball in a high arc over the opponent's head with the objective of landing the ball in the opponent's backcourt. (See also Lob (tennis))

== M ==
Major League Pickleball or MLP
An American professional pickleball sports league and pro pickleball tour that uses the MLP team format for each tournament. The MLP's parent corporation is the UPA.
Major League Pickleball Australia or MLPA
An Australian professional pickleball sports league and pro pickleball tour that uses the MLP team format for each tournament. The MLPA's parent corporation is the UPA. Formerly the Pacific Pickleball League (PPL).
Match
A set of games that determines which player, or team, will advance within a bracket level, or who will win the tournament championship. Usually an odd number of games, such as 1, 3 or 5, are played. The player, or team, that wins the most games advances.
Match point
See Game point
Medical time-out
See Time-out
Men's doubles
See Doubles.
Men's singles
See Singles.
Midcourt
The area of the court between the non-volley zone and backcourt including the transition zone.
Mini-singles
A version of singles pickleball where only half of each player's court is used during each rally.
Misdirection
A strategy where a player intentionally deceives their opponent by preparing to hit the ball in a certain direction, or with a certain pace, but at the last second hitting the ball in an unexpected direction or with an unexpected pace.
Mixed doubles
See Doubles.
MLP or MLP Tour
See Major League Pickleball
MLPA or MLPA Tour
See Major League Pickleball Australia
MLPlay
the team format used by Major League Pickleball.
Momentum
In physics, momentum is the tendency of a body in motion to continue its motion and direction. If a player's momentum causes that player to step in or touch the non-volley zone, after volleying the ball, that player incurs a fault. All actions that took place after the offending player volleyed the ball are void, regardless of whether the other side continued to play the point, and regardless of how many time the ball passed over the net after the offending player first volleyed the ball. Momentum may also refer to the tendency to expect a side that has won multiple consecutive points, to continue winning additional points.

== N ==
Nasty Nelson
A body shot made during the serve intentionally hitting the non-receiving opposing player closest to the net, rewarding the point to the server. Named for Timothy Nelson. Such a shot is always a fault for the receiving side of the net, and a point for the serving side, because the non-receiving player is not allowed to interfere with the serve in any way.
National Pickleball League or NPL
May refer to one of the following:

- National Pickleball League Australia, a professional pickleball league in Australia.
- National Pickleball League of Champions Pros, a professional pickleball league in the United States for players over 50 years old.
- Official National Pickleball League, a nationwide amateur pickleball league in the United States.

Navratil serve
See Chainsaw serve.
No man's land
See Transition zone
Non-volley line or Kitchen line
Court lines on each side of the net that are parallel to the net, and 7 feet (2.1 m) from the net, that run from one sideline to the other. The non-volley line, and the sidlenes on either side of the NVZ, are part of the non-volley zone.
Non-volley zone, NVZ or Kitchen
A 7 feet (2.1 m) by 20 feet (6.1 m) area adjacent to the net within which one may not volley the ball. The non-volley zone includes all lines around it. Also called the "kitchen". A player may step or stand within the non-volley zone at any time, but must reestablish both feet outside the non-volley zone prior to volleying the ball. If a player's momentum causes the player to touch any part of the non-volley zone after volleying the ball, it results in a dead ball and that player incurs a fault, regardless of whether the other team continued to play or not.
NPL
See See National Pickleball League.
NVZ
See Non-volley zone.

== O ==
Odd service court
See Service court.
Open face
Tilting the paddle face up when striking the ball with the lower edge of the racket angled forward. (See also Closed face and Flat face)
Out
A line call made when a ball lands outside the court lines, or in the case of a serve, outside the service court. Sometimes indicated with a hand signal by pointing the index finger up, or sideways in the direction the ball was out.
Out!
An exclamation made by a player which may be interpreted in one of two ways:

- If "out!" is uttered after the ball has contacted the ground, it is considered a line call and results in a dead ball. If it is subsequently determined that the ball was not actually "out", it is a fault for the team making the call.
- If "out!" is uttered before the ball has contacted the ground, it is considered player communication; one partner warning the other not to hit the ball. Such communication is allowed and has no bearing on the outcome of the rally, regardless of whether or not the ball lands inside or outside the applicable lines.

Outdoor ball
See Ball type.
Overgrip or Overwrap
A thin secondary clothlike padded binding used to cover the primary grip that is on the handle of the paddle. Overgrips may provide additional girth, stickiness, sweat absorption or cosmetic appeal, and are generally less expensive and more easily replaceable than the primary grip covering.
Overhead smash
See Smash.
Overspin
See Spin.

== P ==
Pace
The speed and power imparted to the ball when it is struck by the paddle. Pace can be used strategically to control the tempo or rhythm of the game and to put the opponent on the defensive. The ability to alter pace can leave the opponent uncertain about what to expect from each shot.
Pacific Pickleball League
See Major League Pickleball Australia.

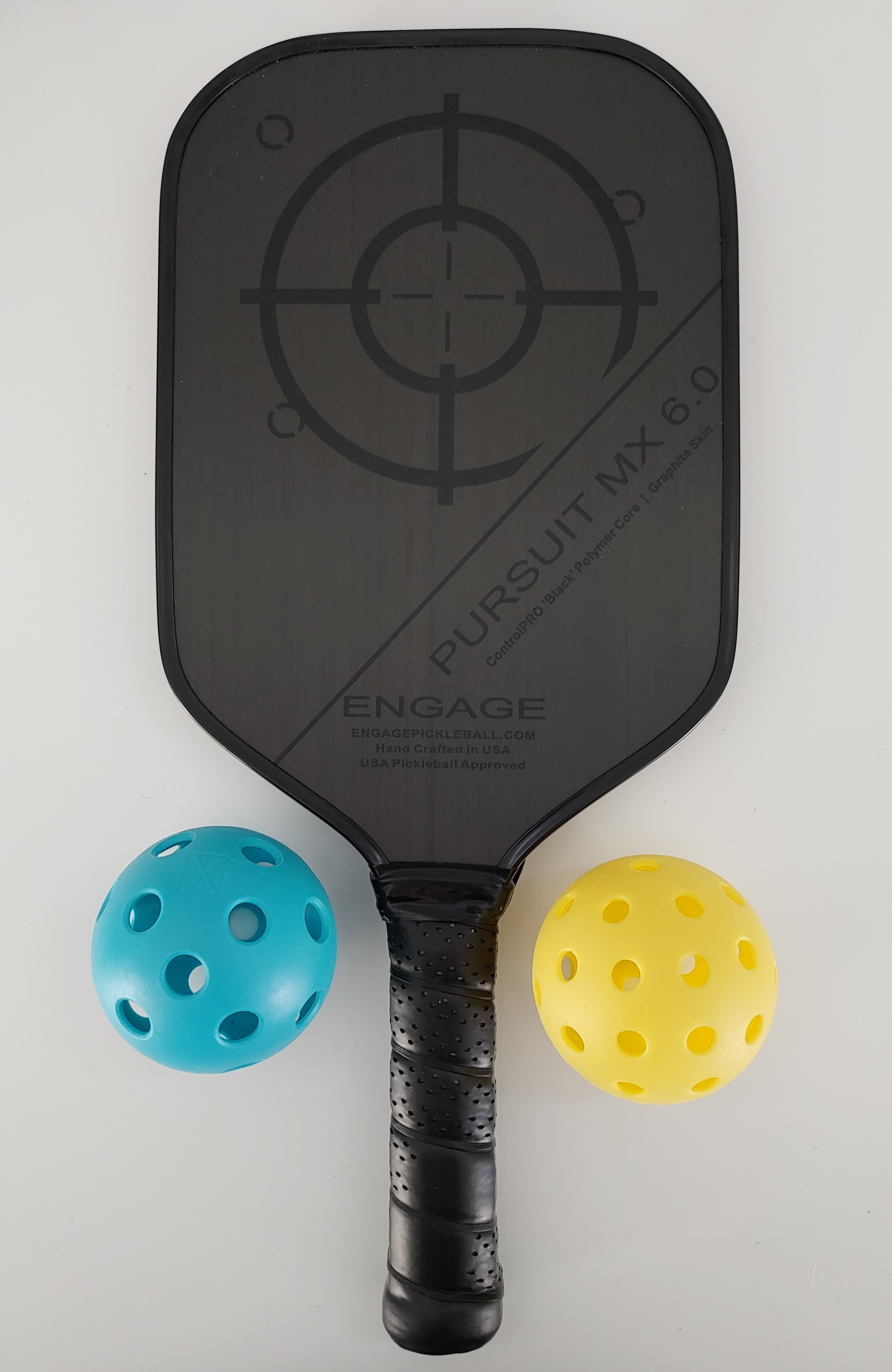
A pickleball paddle with two pickleballs.

Paddle
The racket used to hit the ball. A smooth-faced non-netted racket.
Paddle tap
A courtesy performed at the end of each game or match. All players meet at the net and tap their paddles showing respect and appreciation for the game and the other players. Sometimes a paddle tap is substituted with a handshake or fist bump.
Paddle speed
The swing speed of the paddle head when it makes contact with the ball, which affects the amount of spin and speed of the shot.
Pancake grip
See Western grip.
Pantry
Unofficially, the area outside the court on either side of the kitchen (Non-Volley-Zone). When a player jumps over the kitchen to execute an Erne shot, the player lands in the pantry.
Partner communication
Any physical or vocal communication made from one partner to the other to coordinate their activities. For example, yelling "out!" to let their partner know the ball will likely land out of bounds, or "you!" to let their partner know they should try to return the ball. See also Out!.
Passing shot
A shot down the sidelines or cross-court while your opponent is at the net, aimed at bypassing your opponent’s positioning and forcing them to make a difficult return.
PBTV
See Pickleballtv.
Permanent object
Any object near or above the court such as the ceiling, fencing, net posts, spectators, or officials. If a ball hits a permanent object, but the ball had not yet bounced on the opposing side's court, the last player striking the ball incurs a fault. If the ball hits a permanent object after bouncing on the opposing side's court, the opposing side incurs a fault.
PHOF
The Pickleball Hall of Fame.
Pickle or Pickled
When a team loses 11-0. A Golden pickle is when a team loses 11-0 without ever having the opportunity to serve.
Pickle boat
In the sport of rowing, or crew, a pickle boat is a team of rowers made up of leftover rowers (those who have not been selected to compete as principal rowers). Joel Pritchard's wife has said that she named the sport of pickleball after the pickle boat, because the sport had been created from pieces of equipment that were left over from other sports. (See Etymology of pickleball)
Pickle point
See Game point.
Pickleball
The word pickleball may refer to the sport of pickleball, or to the ball used in the sport. Older spellings of the word include "pickle ball" and "pickle-ball".
Pickleball elbow or Tennis elbow
A form of tendinitis called lateral epicondylitis. It is caused by prolonged or intense stress on the forearm muscles, particularly the extensors that move your wrist and fingers. This over usage creates tiny tears in the tendons attaching the extensors to your elbow.
Pickleball points
Pickleball is played to 11 points, and must be won by a margin of two points.
Pickleballtv or PBTV
A free ad-supported streaming television channel that was launched in November 2023. It is co-owned by the Tennis Channel and the United Pickleball Association, the parent company of the PPA Tour and Major League Pickleball.
Pickler
A pickleball player, particularly someone obsessed with the sport.
Pickles
The name of a dog owned by Joel and Joan Pritchard that is often said to be the origin of the name for the sport of pickleball. However, Joan Pritchard has said that the dog came along after the sport was already named, and that it was the dog that was named after the sport. (See Etymology of pickleball)
Plane of the net
The imaginary vertical plane that extends above the net and to both sides of the net. No player may cross the plane of the net except when striking the ball.
Player communication
See Partner communication.
Player position
The location of a player on the court. The rules allow players stand anywhere on the court, or off the court, except when serving. The server must be behind the baseline and within the imaginary extensions of the centerline and sideline when serving. Players cannot cross the plane of the net, unless in the process of striking the ball, and cannot stand within the non-volley zone when volleying the ball. See also pickleball player positioning and Stacking.
Player rating
See Rating.
Poach
In doubles; When players cross over to their partner's side of the court to take a shot that would normally be their partner's responsibility. Poaching can be a successful strategy to catch the opponent off guard or when there is an opportunity for a put-away shot, but it can create team disharmony, if frequently performed unsuccessfully or done for the sole purpose of dominating play.
Point
A point may refer to a period of the game that begins with a serve and ends with a dead ball (also known as a rally) or to the score of one earned by the side that has not incurred the fault. Because official pickleball rules specify side-out scoring, a point (period) only results in a point (score) when the non-serving side faults—-but see Scoring for possible exceptions.
Pop-up
A ball that is hit high enough that it is easily attackable. Usually this is unintentional.
PPA orr PPA Tour
See Professional Pickleball Association
PPL
See Major League Pickleball Australia.
Pro or Professional player
A pro pickleball player may refer to a player who is under contract with a pro tour to play at a certain number of tour tournaments. A Pro player may also refer to any player that plays in a tournament's professional level division, which often requires that the player's rating be above a certain minimum.
Pro or Professional tour
A series of professional pickleball tournaments played at multiple venues over a set period of weeks or months. Examples include the APP Tour, MLP Tour and PPA Tour. A pro pickleball tour may also include amateur level tournaments at each venue.
Professional Pickleball Association
A pro pickleball tour governed by the UPA of America.
Pukaball
An alternate name for the sport of pickleball used chiefly in Hawaii.
Punch shot or Punch Volley
A volley shot made with a quick forward punching motion with little backswing.
Putaway
An offensive shot that the opponent cannot react fast enough to successfully counter.

== Q ==
Questionable call
A call, usually a line call, made by one team that appears to the other team that it may have been an incorrect call. In a non-refereed game, the team on the side of the net closest to the call determines the final call. In a refereed match, the call can be appealed to the referee.
Queen of the Court
See King of the Court.

== R ==
Rally
A round of play that starts with a serve and ends with a dead ball or fault.
Rally scoring
See Scoring.
Ranking or Standing
A player or team’s position within a hierarchical achievement-based list. Rankings are typically a sequential ordinal list of players, or teams, in order of highest performing to lowest performing over a specified period, such as a year or competition season. The list may be used to determine entry qualifications and/or seeding within tournaments.
Rating
A numeric score assigned to a player indicating the player's skill level. The higher the number, the higher the player's skill level. Ratings may be used by tournament directors to group players, or teams, into skill-based brackets. Systems used to rate pickleball player skills include DUPR and UTR-Pickleball.
Ready position
The stance a player should take in advance of their opponent hitting the ball. The best ready position may change depending on where a player is on the court, but generally means a player is; facing the ball, with both feet planted a little more than shoulder width apart, putting their weight on the balls of their feet, and holding the paddle out front about chest height.
Receiver
The player returning the serve that is diagonally opposite the server.
Referee time-out
See Time-out
Regular time-out
See Time-out
Right service court
See Service court.

== S ==
Score
The current status of the game that is announced prior to each serve. In singles the score is announced as the serving side's total points followed by the receiving side's total points. In doubles the score is announced as the serving side's total points, followed by the receiving side's total points, followed by the serving side's server number.
Score freezing or Win-on-serve score freezing
In certain pickleball competition formats where rally scoring is used, such as the MLP team format, a team can only score the game-winning point when they are serving. If a team needs only one additional point to win the game, but the other side is serving, since the game-winning point can only be won when serving, the winning team's score is frozen; meaning they cannot earn a point on a side-out. If the other team manages to catch up to the team that only needed one additional point, thereby tying the game, the score of the team that was originally in the lead is no longer frozen. In a tied score situation, neither team's score is frozen since either team must win at least two more points to win the game.
Scoring
May refer to the point earned when a team wins a rally, or the type of scoring used during a match. Two types of scoring are commonly used, side-out scoring and rally scoring, but the official pickleball rules specify side-out scoring.

- Rally Scoring: A method of play where either side can be awarded a point at the end of a rally, the point going to the side that did not commit the fault.
- Side-out Scoring: A method of play where only the serving side can be awarded a point at the end of a rally, and only when the non-serving side commits a fault.

Scorpion
An overhead shot taken by a player while in a squatted position. An offensive shot often used in lieu of what might otherwise be a defensive backhand shot.
Second server, Second serve
In doubles; the person the serve passes to, and the call announced by an official, when the serving team commits their first fault after a side–out.
Self-rating
A pickleball player's skill rating that is based on evaluating the player's abilities against a table of increasingly difficult pickleball skills.
Serve, service
The initial strike of the ball to start a rally. Two types of underhand serves are permitted in pickleball.

- Drop serve: A serve where the ball is dropped to the ground and allowed to bounce one or more times before striking it with the paddle.
- Volley serve: A serve where the ball is struck without allowing the ball to first hit the ground.

Server number
In doubles; either "1" or "2", designating whether the server is the team's first or second server. There are two different contexts the term is used: a team's first or second server of the game, or a team's first or second server after a side out. Each team's first server of the game is also called that team's starting server.

- The first server of the game should always be serving from the right service court when their team's score is even, and the left service court when their score is odd. The opposite is true for the team's second server of the game. Tournament directors often require each team's first server of game to wear a wristband.
- The first or second server after a side out is the third number announced when the score is called; a one if the server is the first server after a side out, and a two if the server is second server after a side out.
- Since the first team serving in a game is only allowed one server before the first side out of the game, when the score is called by the very first server of a game it is always called as if the server was the second server with respect a side-out, even though no side out has technically occurred. Hence, the score is called 0-0-2.

Service court or Service area
The area of the court that a valid serve must land in; bounded by the non-volley line, centerline, sideline, and baseline. All lines are considered in, except the non-volley line. A serve landing on the non-volley line is a fault.

- Left service court: The service court to the left of the centerline, when facing the net. Also called the "odd service court", since a side's score will be odd whenever that side's starting server is serving from the left side of the court.
- Right service court: The service court to the right of the centerline, when facing the net. Also called the "even service court", since a side's score will be even whenever that side's starting server is serving from the right side of the court.

Service line
See Baseline.
Service return
The first ball returned over the net after a serve.
Serving area
The area behind the baseline, and between the imaginary extended sidelines, that a valid serve can be served from.
Shake & bake or Crush & rush
In doubles; A strategy used by the serving team on the third shot. Instead of performing a third shot drop, one player (the shaker) drives the ball low and hard over the net while the other player (the baker) rushes to the net near the centerline. The intent is to pressure the opponent into making a weak volley or pop up shot that the "baker" can put-away.
Shaker
See Shake & bake.
Side-out
When a team loses its right to serve and the serve moves to the opponent's side of the net.
Side-out scoring
See Scoring.
Sidelines
The lines perpendicular to the net on each side of the court, denoting in- and out-of-bounds.
Sidespin
See Spin.
Singles
Pickleball matches having one player per side. (Contrast to Doubles)

- Coed singles: Each side has one player without regard to sex.
- Men's singles: Each side has one male player.
- Women's singles: Each side has one female player.

Skinny singles
See Mini-singles.
Skill level
A generalized skill rating assigned to a player such as, beginner, intermediate, or advanced. (See also Rating.)
Slice
See Chop.
Smash or Overhead smash
A powerful shot that is made while the ball is above the player's head. It permits the player to drive the ball in a sharp downward direction making it difficult to return. The shot is often used in response to a Lob shot. (See Smash (tennis))
Speed up
When a player quickly increases the pace of the ball to end a slow dink rally. This might be due to the other side accidentally hitting an attackable ball or to catch the other team off guard.
Spin

Diagram S: the three axes of rotation. If arrow "X" represents the direction of the ball, then spin around the X-axis would be corkspin, the Y-axis backspin or topspin, and the Z-axis sidespin.

Any rotation imparted on a ball by the strike of the paddle. Spin is commonly described as topspin, backspin, sidespin or corkspin, depending on the axis of rotation. Topspin and backspin have the same axis of rotation, but spin in opposite directions. Spin imparted on a ball is almost always a combination of more than one type of spin and would rarely exactly align with the three axes represented in diagram S. (For the science behind the effects of spin see Magnus effect.)

- Backspin or Underspin: The reverse rotation of the ball in relation to the ball’s trajectory, where the axis of rotation runs parallel to the ground and parallel to the plane of the net. Backspin is imparted by brushing the back of the ball from high to low. It provides lift as the ball travels through the air and results in a lower and shorter bounce once the ball strikes the ground or tends to make the ball angle down after hitting the opponent's paddle.
- Topspin or Overspin: the forward rotation of a ball in relation to the ball’s trajectory where the axis of rotation runs parallel to the ground and parallel to the plane of the net. Topspin is imparted by brushing the back of the ball from low to high. It creates a downward force as the ball travels through the air, causing the ball to dive or drop, and resulting in a higher and longer bounce once the ball strikes the ground or tends to make the ball pop up after hitting the opponent's paddle.
- Sidespin: The rotation of the ball where the axis of rotation is perpendicular to the ground and parallel to the plane of the net. Sidespin is imparted by brushing the back of the ball from left to right, or right to left. It causes the ball to curve while traveling through the air and to bounce right or left after hitting the ground or opponent's paddle. In cue sports, sidespin is often referred to as english.
- Corkspin or rifling: The rotation of the ball where the axis of rotation is parallel to the ground and perpendicular to the plane of the net. Corkspin is imparted by brushing up or down on either side of the ball. It has minimal effect on the ball while traveling through the air but can cause the ball to severely dart left or right after hitting the ground, but minimal effect when struck by the opponent's paddle.

Stacking
In doubles; when teammates line up, or "stack", on the same side of the center line during a serve, or service return, positioning themselves to move to their preferred court positions. Preferred positions may be determined by each players skills, abilities, speed, or whether each player is right or left handed. For the purpose of serving and receiving, teammates must alternate between the right and left sides of their court each time they earn a point. Other than when acting as the server or receiver, teammates may position themselves anywhere on the court that provides them with the best advantage. Stacking permits a doubles team to quickly move into the positions they deem most advantageous. Stacking adds complexity that can result in confusion regarding which player is the correct server or receiver. The wrong server or receiver results in a fault. (See also Switching)

- Half stack: when a team stacks only prior to serving
- Three-quarters stack: when a team stacks prior to serving, and only half the time prior to receiving; when that team's quickest player is the receiver
- Full stack: when a team stacks both prior to serving and prior to receiving

Standing
See Ranking.
Standing player
Any player that is playing the game while standing. Used to distinguish from wheelchair players who are playing the game in a wheelchair.
Starting server
In doubles; the first server in a game on each side. When the starting server is serving from the right side of the court the serving side's score will be zero or an even number. When the starting server is serving from the left side of the court the serving side's score will be an odd number. The opposite is true of the non-starting server.
Swipe serve
See Chainsaw serve.
Switch
In doubles, a call made by one partner to the other to switch sides (see switching). The call might be communicated verbally, or with a hand signal.
Switching
In doubles; a strategy used to position each partner in a more advantageous position. The two partners will each switch to the opposite side of the court from where they started. This may occur in mid-play when a player moves to take a ball on their partner's side of the court, and the partner then moves to the other side of the court to cover. It might also occur after a service return. The receiving team's player that is near the non-volley line may use a hand signal behind their back to indicate whether or not the two players should switch sides after the return. (See also Hand signal and Stacking)

== T ==
Tag
See Body shot.
Tennis elbow
See Pickleball elbow.
Third shot
The third shot of a rally that comes after the first time the receiving team returns the ball to the serving team.
Third shot drive
A strategy used by the serving team, on their third shot, to force their opponent to hit a block shot, thereby giving the serving team an opportunity to approach the net.
Third shot drop
A strategy used by the serving team to place the ball just over the net in their opponent's non-volley zone thereby making it difficult for their opponent to attack the ball and giving the serving team time to move up to the non-volley line.
Three-quarters stack
See Stacking
Time-out
A break in play during a game. Three types of time-outs are permitted.

- Regular time-out: A one-minute break in the game that can be called by either side. Two regular time-outs are allowed per side in an 11-point game. Time-outs are often used as a strategy to break the opponent's momentum.
- Medical time-out: Each player is permitted one 15-minute medical time-out per match. The time used must be continuous, meaning it cannot be broken up into multiple match interruptions.
- Referee time-out: A pause in play called by the referee to address any extenuating circumstances such as a safety concern.

Tomahawk shot
A high overhead shot near the kitchen where the player begins with the paddle in a standard backhand position, as if ready to hit a backhand volley, but the wrist is quickly rotated to hit a forehand overhead shot.
Topspin
See Spin.
Tournament director
The lead organizer of a tournament.
Transition zone
The part of the court approximately midway between the baseline and the non-volley line. Considered a strategically vulnerable location for a player to be standing. Also referred to as "No man's land".
Triple crown
When a player wins singles, gender doubles and mixed doubles, all in the same tournament.
Tweener
When a player returns a shot by hitting the ball between their own legs. This may occur when chasing down a lobbed ball that the player cannot get in front of, with the player's back to the net, or when a player is facing the net and the ball passes between their legs, and their only option is to reach around and return the ball back between their legs and over the net. (See also Tweener (tennis))
Two-bounce rule or Double-bounce Rule
The requirement that the receiving team and the serving team must each allow the ball to bounce once on their side at the beginning of every rally before attempting to volley the ball.
Two-handed backhand
A backhand shot where both hands are on the grip of the paddle.
Two-handed forehand
A forehand shot where both hands are on the grip of the paddle.
Twoey
A two-handed shot, but most often used to refer to a two-handed backhand shot.

== U ==
Under-spin
See Spin.
Underhand serve
A serve that strikes the ball while the player's hand and paddle are moving forward with an upward arc. Official pickleball rules do not use the term "underhand serve", but the rules do state that a volley serve must be served in this manner. The rules do not specify that a drop serve must be served in this manner, but the limited bounce of the ball, after the drop, necessitates an underhand serve.
USA Pickleball, USAP, USAPA
USA Pickleball (USAP) is the governing body of pickleball within the United States. It was previously known as the USA Pickleball Association (USAPA) or the US Amateur Pickleball Association (U.S.A.P.A.).
USA Pickleball Tournament Player Rating or UTPR
A pickleball player rating system previously used by USA Pickleball, but replaced with UTR-Pickleball in 2024.
UTR-Pickleball or UTR-P
A pickleball player rating system developed by UTR Sports based on their Universal Tennis Rating software. UTR-P scores range from 1 to 10 in .001 increments.

== V ==
Volley
To hit the ball before it touches the ground and bounces.
Volley serve
See Serve.

== W ==
Western grip or Pancake grip or Fryingpan grip
Grasping the paddle handle so that the index finger and thumb form a "V" in line with the fourth bevel on the paddle handle; an angle similar to flipping a pancake or picking up a frying pan. (See also Grip)
Wheelchair player
Any player, whether disabled or not, that plays the game while in a wheelchair. Used to distinguish from standing players who are playing the game without a wheelchair.
Win-on-serve
See Score freezing.
Women's doubles
See Doubles.
Women's singles
See Singles.
World Pickleball Day
October 10th of each year. Established by the World Pickleball Federation in 2020.
World Pickleball Federation (WPF)
A federation of national pickleball organizations founded in 2018.
WPF
See World Pickleball Federation.

== Y ==
You!
A common exclamation used in partner communication in doubles pickleball. The player saying "you!" is telling their partner that they should try to return the ball over the net, because the player making the exclamation feels their partner is in a better position to do so.

== Z ==
Zane Navratil serve
See Chainsaw serve.
Zero–Zero or 0-0
The starting score for a game of singles pickleball.
Zero–Zero–Two, Zero–Zero–Start or 0-0-2
The starting score for a game of doubles pickleball.

== See also ==
- Etymology of pickleball
- Glossary of tennis terms
