= Grip (tennis) =

Technique for holding a racquet

A grip in tennis refers to the technique a player chooses to grasp the racket handle. Commonly used grip styles include the continental grip, the eastern grip and the semi-western grip. Grip styles may also be categorized by whether it is a forehand or backhand grip. Professional players often change grips during a match depending on the shot they are hitting. Grip, along with overgrip, may also refer to the soft material covering the hard core of the racket handle.

== Handle shape ==
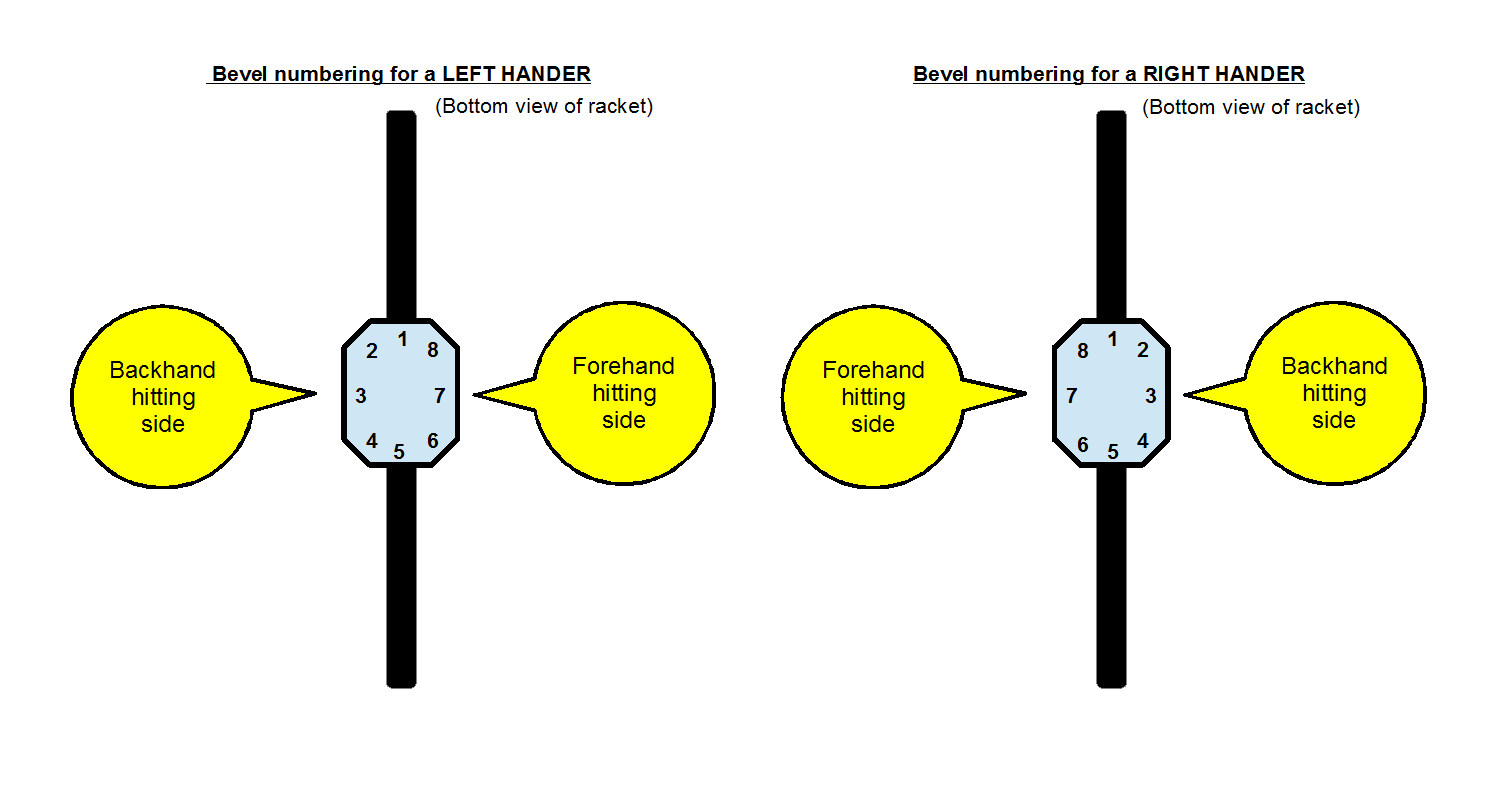
Diagram A: Numbering of bevels on a tennis racket grip for both left and right-handed players.

The handle of a racket is an octagon shape, with eight sides, giving the handle a somewhat rounded feel. This makes it more comfortable than a square handle, while also providing more friction than a truly round handle. Each of the handle's eight sides is called a bevel. For reference, the bevels are numbered from 1 to 8 (see Diagram A). With the blade of the racquet perpendicular to the ground, the bevel facing up is bevel #1. For right-handed players, after rotating the racquet counterclockwise (turning the forehand face of the paddle towards the ground), the next bevel facing up is bevel #2, and so on to identify all eight bevels. For left-handed players the bevel numbering is obtained in the same manner, but by rotating the racquet clockwise.

When discussing the various grip styles, each grip style can be associated with a particular bevel by determining where the palm side of the metacarpophalangeal joint (knuckle joint) at the base of the index finger is placed on the paddle handle. For example, when the joint is placed on bevel #2, it is a continental grip.

In addition to grip style, it is important to consider grip size by measuring the circumference of the beveled handle.

== Types of grips ==
=== The Continental Grip (Bevel #2) ===
This grip is known as "the Shotgun". This is due to its strange nature of attack and pressure on the ball. Whenever it is used, the grip must be applied firmly, near the shaft of the racket to properly produce enough effect. This will cause the racket to come explosively on the ball, like a shotgun. Hence, the name "Shotgun". The Continental grip is well-suited to slice shots, because it lends itself to positioning the racket face slightly upward. The name reflects its origins on the European continent at a time when grass courts were common and so balls did not bounce as high as on hard courts.

=== The Eastern forehand Grip (Bevel #3) ===
The Eastern forehand grip is primarily used for flatter groundstrokes. In order to execute a proper Eastern forehand grip, players need both index knuckle and heel pad to rest on bevel #3. An easy way to implement this is to place the palm flat against the strings and slide down to the handle and grab, in order to achieve an Eastern forehand. Advantages are this is one of the easiest grips for learning the forehand, easier (faster) to change to a Continental to do some volleying, or slice. The Eastern forehand grip became popular in the Eastern United States as grass courts were replaced by hard courts, causing balls to bounce higher. Notable players with this grip include Juan Martin Del Potro, Roger Federer and Steffi Graf.

=== The Semi-Western Forehand Grip (Bevel #4) ===
The Semi-Western grip is an "advanced" form that most players either change to on purpose or naturally find through practice. This grip closes the racket face more upon contact, allowing for more topspin but is still able to generate pace. This grip is the most popular on tour and is used by several greats, such as Rafael Nadal and Andy Murray.

=== The Western Forehand Grip (Bevel #5) ===
The Western grip is one of the more extreme forehand grips used to generate topspin. This grip closes the racket face more than semi-western and was originally used by Rafael Nadal growing up. This grip is great for maximizing margin and hitting deep, loopy balls. Notable players using this grip are Karen Khachanov and Kei Nishikori. Another variation, popularized by Novak Djokovic, is the 3/4 Western grip. For this grip, the knuckle is slightly on the Semi-Western bevel (4) and the heel pad more on the Western side.

=== The Hawaiian Forehand Grip (Bevel #6) ===
The Hawaiian grip is the most extreme forehand grip used to generate heavy topspin. Because of the extreme wrist position, it is not recommended to use because it may cause wrist pain and other joint problems. The nature of the grip is to generate topspin because of the closed racket face. This means that it is harder to drive through the ball, however, it is still possible. The most popular player to use this grip is Jack Sock.

=== The Two-Handed Forehand Grip (F: Bevel #2 + B: Bevel #7) ===
The basic Two-Handed Forehand grip, is obtained by holding the racquet in a regular Continental grip, then placing the left hand above holding it in a left-handed Eastern Forehand grip. Holding the racquet using two hands for the forehand is highly unusual, but some well-known top WTA players (e.g. Monica Seles, Marion Bartoli) have used it successfully. While it shortens the forehand reach and reduces maximum power, it offers unrivalled accuracy, which may more than compensate the former drawbacks. Also, combined with a two-handed backhand, it is almost impossible for the opponent to see which side (backhand or forehand) is hitting the ball. The sides often are equally accurate, and no grip change is required.

=== The Eastern Backhand Grip (Bevel #1) ===
The Eastern Backhand grip is obtained when placing the hand such that the base knuckle of the index finger and heel of the hand are right on bevel #1. This grip allows for significant spin and control. The opposite face of the racket is used compared to the Eastern forehand. For someone who uses a Western forehand grip, on the other hand, the same face of the racket as in the forehand is used to strike the ball; no need to change grips if the forehand is played with a Western grip.

=== The Semi-Western Backhand grip (Bevel #8) ===
The Semi-Western backhand grip is achieved by placing the hand such that the base knuckle of the index finger is right on bevel #8. Compared to the Continental grip, the blade has rotated 90 degrees clockwise. Although not as popular as the Eastern backhand grip, due to the naturally closed position of the racquet, the Semi-Western grip allows for even greater topspin and can still generate pace.

This is essentially equivalent to the Semi-Western forehand grip. The same face of the racquet as in the forehand is used to strike the ball. No need to change grips if the forehand is played with a Semi-Western grip.

=== The Semi-Western Two-Handed Backhand Grip (F: Bevel #2 + B: Bevel #6) ===
The basic Two-Handed Backhand grip is obtained by holding the racquet in a regular Continental grip, then placing the left hand above holding it in a left-handed Semi-Western Forehand grip. This places the reference bevels of the two hands exactly opposite each other. Holding the racquet using two hands for the backhand is common, but there are multiple variations in the precise positioning of the two hands. This also varies between right- and left-handed players.

A different face of the racquet than in the forehand is used to strike the ball.

== The evolution of forehand grips ==
During the first two decades of the 20th century, diminutive "Little Bill" Johnston had an exceptionally strong forehand, a stroke that he hit shoulder-high using a Western grip. Few top players used the Western grip after the 1920s, but in the latter part of the 20th century, as shot-making techniques and equipment changed, the Western forehand made a comeback and is now used by a number of modern players. With the changes in technology, the various grips have come to be used differently from previously. First, the Continental grip is used primarily to serve and to volley, not to hit forehand shots, or a backhand slice. The Eastern grip is still used, though less than in the past, and is used to hit flat shots. It is excellent to hit low passing shots. The most popular grip on the tour is the Semi-Western grip. It gives a nice mix of spin and pace on the forehand, and offers ease to transition to the backhand grip. Finally the Western grip (and its extreme variations), are some of the most radical grips used on the tour, mostly by clay-courters, and are used to create massive amounts of topspin.

== The evolution of backhand grips ==
The backhand can be executed with either one or both hands. As of 2023 less than 10% of the world's tennis players were estimated to use a one-handed backhand. Only 17 of the top 1000-ranked women used a one-handed grip, and only 43 of the top 1000-ranked men did so, with only 12 men in the top 100 doing so. However, even players who use a two-handed backhand usually play with only one hand for their backhand slice and their drop shot hit with the backhand.

For most of the 20th century the backhand was performed with one hand, using either a backhand Eastern or Continental grip. In modern tennis, there are a few professional players who use a Semi-western one-hand backhand. This shot is held in a similar manner to the Eastern forehand. It has much more topspin potential than the traditional Eastern one-hander. The Semi-western one-handed backhand grip makes it easier for a one-handed player to hit balls at shoulder height, but harder to hit low balls, and vice versa for the eastern one-handed backhand. The eastern one-handed backhand and its variants are used by most pros with strong single-handed backhand drives, like Gustavo Kuerten (now retired), especially Richard Gasquet among the men, and Justine Henin (now retired) among the women.

The two-handed backhand is most commonly used with the forehand hand holding the racquet with a Continental grip and the non-dominant hand holding the racquet with a Semi-western forehand grip. While this is by far the most common way to hit a two-handed backhand, there are players who use different ways of holding the racquet for a two-handed backhand.

The player long considered to have had the best backhand of all time, Don Budge, had a powerful one-handed stroke in the 1930s and 1940s that imparted topspin onto the ball. Ken Rosewall, a one-handed backhand, used a tremendously accurate slice backhand with underspin through the 1950s and 1960s. The one-handed backhand slice is often used in rallies as it is a comfortable shot. Andre Agassi in particular increased his use of the one-handed backhand and often hit an unreturnable dropshot with it.

== Grips used for serving ==
The grip for the serve depends on the type of serve. At professional levels, the continental grip is used to hit all serves. Some players turn the grip more, towards the Eastern backhand grip (bevel #1), to maximize spin during a kick serve.

To impart slice onto a serve, the server tosses the ball a little to the right of their body (if they are right-handed) and cuts the ball diagonally to create side and topspin. For a right-hander, the slice serve curves to the left and down in the court. This pulls players out wide or jams them into their body to set up a high, put away ball.

There is also the kick serve, widely used for the second serve because of its great margin, ability to drop into the court, and for offsetting opponents because of its spin. For most, the topspin serve is hit by using a Continental forehand grip (bevel #2) and some use an Eastern backhand grip (bevel #1) to generate more spin.

== See also ==
- Grip (badminton)
- Grip (pickleball)
