= List of tennis umpires =

Listed are current and past tennis chair umpires who hold or have held a gold badge International Tennis Federation (ITF) rating. Gold badge umpires typically officiate Grand Slam, ATP Tour and WTA Tour matches. The list includes only those who hold or have held a gold badge as a chair umpire, and not those who hold or have held a similar badge in refereeing or chief umpiring. The year, where included, indicates when the umpire obtained their respective gold badge status.

There are three levels of training sanctioned by the International Tennis Federation. After officiating at non-pro events, a chair umpire may enter the "Level 1" program in order to gain a green badge. This is taught in French and/or Spanish and is specifically aimed at officiating in South and Central America and Africa. "Level 2" schools are only taught in English and are for umpires who have already shown proficiency at ITF Pro Circuit events, Davis Cup and Fed Cup ties, and ATP and WTA sanctioned events. It is here that an umpire would receive a white badge. Those chair umpires who pass a "Level 3" school start as a Bronze Badge and can be promoted to Silver and then to Gold following a review of their work rate and performance in the annual review conducted by the ITF, ATP and WTA.

== Active ==
=== Men ===
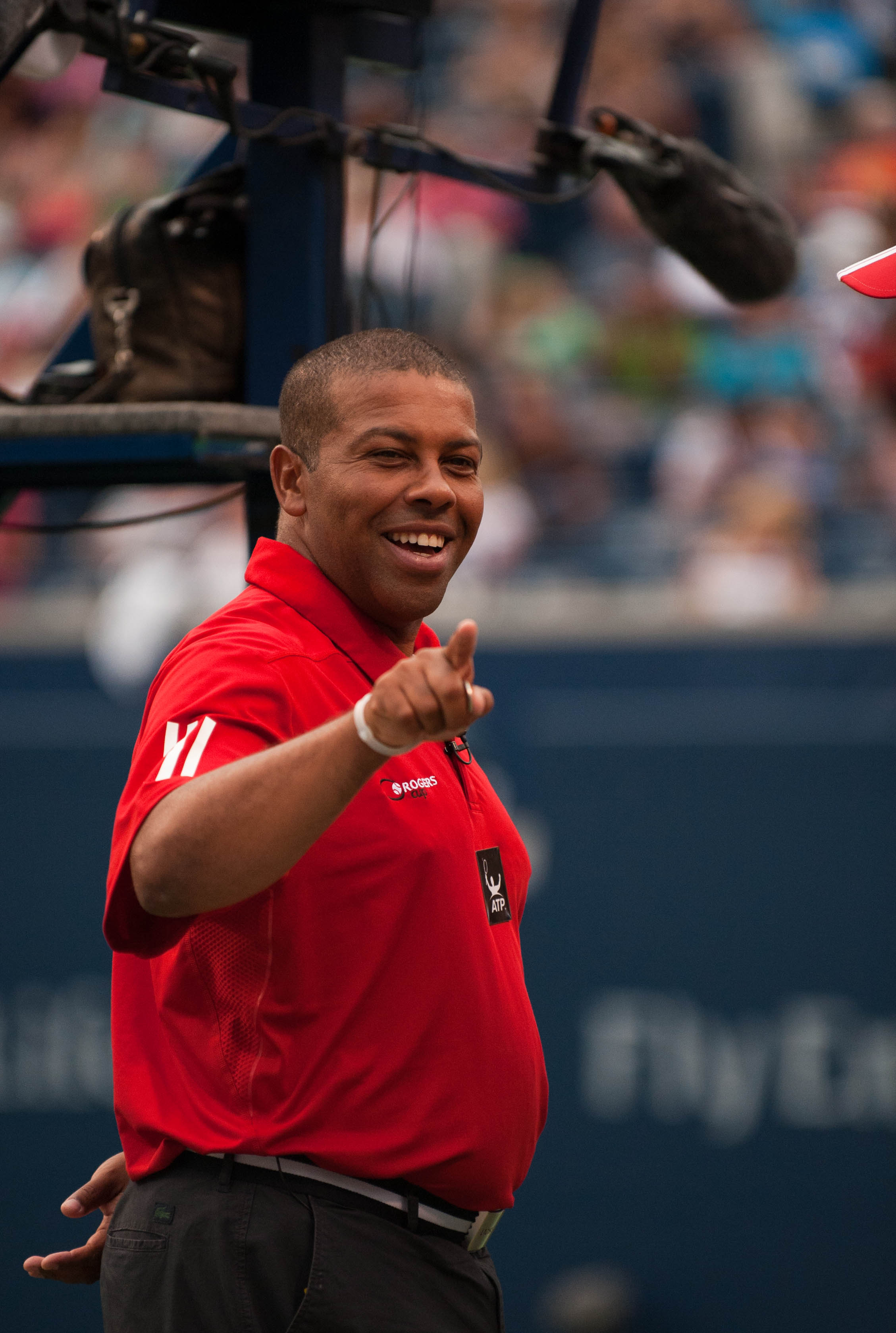
Brazilian umpire Carlos Bernardes

List of active gold-badge male tennis umpires
Name	Nation	Year	Notes
Adel Nour	Egypt	2017	ATP umpire.
Arnaud Gabas	France	2022	ATP umpire; Officiated the 2026 French Open women's singles final. He received a ball shot during a Davis Cup match from Shapovalov which led the player to be defaulted and him to have eye surgery.
Damien Dumusois	France	2009	ITF umpire; Officiated the 2012, 2015, 2016, 2018, 2020, the 2023 French Open men's singles final, the 2026 French Open men's singles final, the 2010 and 2022 French Open women's singles final, the 2017 Wimbledon men's singles final, the 2020 and 2025 Australian Open Men's Singles Final, the 2021 US Open men's singles final, and the 2024 Olympic Games Men's singles final (Umpire Golden Slam). As a regional officer (Africa) at ITF.
Fergus Murphy	Ireland	2000	Senior ATP umpire; officiated the 2023 Wimbledon men's singles final and the 2017 Wimbledon men's doubles final between Łukasz Kubot and Marcelo Melo vs Oliver Marach and Mate Pavić
Greg Allensworth	USA		ATP umpire; Officiated the 2023 US Open men's singles final and the 2026 US Open women's singles final. Had a controversial call on a match-point in a round of 16 match between Draper and Auger-Aliassime in the 2024 Cincinnati ATP.
Gianluca Moscarella	Italy	2010	ITF and WTA umpire. After being suspended during the 2019 Firenze Challenger due to an unprofessional dialog with a player and insinuations to a ball-girl, he was given authorization to return officiating on women matches on 25 April 2022, although the allegations are clearly shown in a video.
James Keothavong	Great Britain	2010	ITF umpire; Officiated the 2014, 2018 and 2024 Wimbledon men's singles final, 2016 and 2021 Wimbledon women's singles final, the 2017 and 2019 Australian Open men's singles final, the 2018 French Open women's singles final and the 2022 French Open men's singles final, the 2024 US Open women's singles final, and the 2025 US Open men's singles final. Also officiated 2019 Fed Cup Final. Brother of Anne Keothavong.
John Blom	Australia	2012	ITF umpire; Officiated the 2013, 2022 and 2026 Australian Open men's singles final and the 2016 Australian Open women's singles final.
Kader Nouni	France	2006	WTA umpire; Officiated the 2012 and the 2013 WTA Finals finals, the 2007, 2009, 2013, 2014 and 2021 French Open women's singles finals, and the 2018 Wimbledon women's singles final.
Manuel Absolu	France	2024	
Manuel Messina	Italy/San Marino		ATP umpire.
Mohamed El Jennati	Morocco		ATP umpire.
Mohamed Lahyani	Sweden/Morocco	1997	Senior ATP umpire; Officiated the longest match in pro tennis history: the Isner–Mahut match at the 2010 Wimbledon Championships, the 2013 Wimbledon Men's final and the 2008, 2010 and 2013 ATP World Tour Finals finals'.Incorrectly called not-up in favour of Alcaraz in his match against Draper in Indian Wells 2025. He then used the newly installed V.A.R.to rectify the call, calling a let and then incorrectly changing it, due to the player's complaint, in favour of Draper.
Nico Helwerth	Germany	2017	ITF umpire; Officiated the 2021 Australian Open men's singles final, the 2022 US Open men's singles final and the 2024 French Open women's singles final
Pierre Bacchi	France	2015	WTA umpire. Officiated 2021 French Open women's singles semifinal between Barbora Krejcikova and Maria Sakkari, with a controversial ball mark inspection on a match point for Krejcikova.
Renaud Lichtenstein	France	2015	ATP umpire; Officiated the 2017 French Open women's singles final, the 2019 French Open men's singles final, the 2022 Wimbledon men's singles final and the 2024 French Open men's singles final. He also officiated the singles final of the ATP Finals 2020 and 2025.
Richard Haigh	Great Britain	2021	ATP umpire; Officiated the 2019 Wimbledon men's doubles final and 2022 Wimbledon women's singles semi final. Officiated the 2023 Wimbledon men's singles semifinal match between Jannik Sinner and Novak Djokovic with a controversial hindrance call against Djokovic.
Robert Balmforth	Great Britain	2025	ITF umpire; Officiated the 2026 Wimbledon women's singles final.
Timo Janzen	Germany	2021	
Tom Sweeney	Australia	2022	Grand Slam and Olympic chair umpire. Officiated the 2023 and 2026 Australian Open women's singles final.

=== Women ===
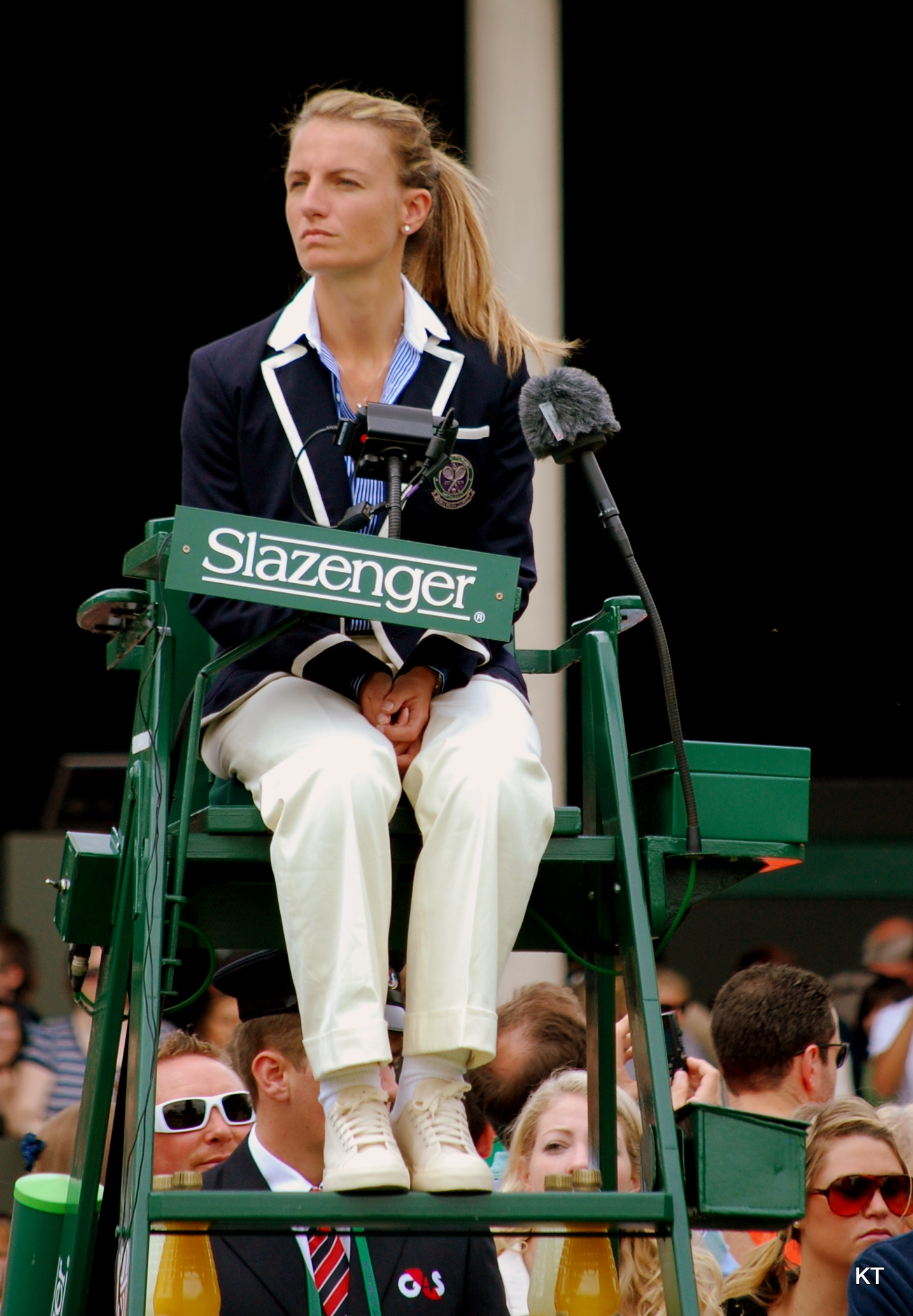
Eva Asderaki at the 2011 Wimbledon Championships.

List of active gold-badge female tennis umpires
Name	Nation	Year	Notes
Alison Hughes (née Lang)	Great Britain	2003	ITF umpire; referee since 1989. Officiated the women's singles final at the 2004 and 2008 Olympic Games, as well as the women's singles final at the 4 Grand Slam tournaments, including the 2016 US Open women's singles Final, the 2017 Australian Open women's singles final, the 2018 US Open men's singles final and the 2019 US Open women's singles final, 2021 Australian Open Women's final, and the 2025 Wimbledon men's singles final. ("Umpire Golden Slam") Umpired all four of the women's doubles of the Grand Slams. She officiated the 2021 Tokyo Olympics Men Singles Final Match. She became the first woman to do this.
Aurélie Tourte	France	2017	Third woman in French history to hold a gold badge in chair umpiring., and believed to be the first woman to sign a full-time contract on the ATP Tour's elite team of umpires as of 2019. Officiated the 2017 French Open women's doubles final, the 2019 French Open women's singles final, the 2021 French Open men's singles Final, the 2022 Wimbledon women's singles final, the 2022 French Open men's doubles final, and the 2024 Australian Open men's singles final. First Woman to Umpire an ATP 500 Final. Chaired the 2020 US Open match where Djokovic was defaulted.
Cecilia Alberti	Italy	2021	
Eva Asderaki-Moore (née Asderaki)	Greece	2007	ITF umpire; Officiated the 2011 US Open women's singles final, the 2011 WTA Finals final, the 2015 and 2024 US Open men's singles final, the 2017, 2023 US Open women's singles final, the 2017 Wimbledon women's singles final, the 2019 Australian Open, US Open Mixed Doubles final, the 2020 Australian Open women's singles final, the 2022 French Open Women's Doubles final, the 2023 French Open Women's singles final, the 2025 French Open Men's singles final, and the 2026 Wimbledon men's singles final. She failed to call a double bounce in the 2025 Australian Open quarter final match between Swiatek and Navarro.
Juan (Jennifer) Zhang	China	2012	WTA umpire; Officiated the 2016 WTA Finals final. First woman in Chinese history to hold a gold badge in chair umpiring.
Julie Kjendlie	Norway	2015	WTA umpire; Officiated the 2018 and 2019 WTA Finals Doubles final.
Katarzyna Radwan-Cho	Poland	2021	ITF Umpire; First Polish Gold Badge Umpire
Kelly Rask (née Thomson)	Great Britain	2022	Officiated the 2018 and 2021 Wimbledon women's doubles final and 2019, 2022 and 2023 Wimbledon women's singles semi finals. Officiated the 2024 Wimbledon women's singles final.
Louise Azemar Engzell (née Engzell)	Sweden	2006	ITF umpire; Officiated the women's singles final at the 2012 Olympics, the 2011 and 2020 French Open women's singles final, the 2012 and 2022 US Open women's singles final, the 2019 and 2025 Australian Open women's singles final, the 2020 Australian Open men's doubles Final, the 2020 US Open men's singles final, the 2023 Australian Open men's singles final, and the 2023 Wimbledon women's singles final (Umpire Golden Slam).
Marija Čičak	Croatia	2011	WTA umpire; Officiated the 2014 Wimbledon women's singles final, the 2015 US Open Women's final, the women's singles final at the 2016 Olympic Games and the 2018 Wimbledon men's singles semifinal between Kevin Anderson and John Isner (the second longest singles tennis match). Umpired Wimbledon women's doubles final 2017. Officiated the 2021 men's singles final at Wimbledon, becoming the first woman to do so.
Marijana Veljović	Serbia	2015	ITF umpire; Officiated the 2018 Australian Open women's singles final, the 2019 Wimbledon Championships women's singles final, the 2021 US Open Women's singles final, the 2025 French Open women's singles final, the 2025 US Open women's singles final, the 2026 US Open men's singles final, and the Fed Cup Final 2019. She officiated the 2021 Tokyo Olympics Women Singles Final Match. Officiated the 2021 Billie Jean King Cup Final. In 2022 she officiated the Australian Open women's singles final.
Marta Mrozinska	Poland	2024	
Miriam Bley	Germany	2019	WTA umpire; First German Gold Badge Female Umpire. Officiated at the 2022 WTA finals in Fort Worth, the 2023 Wimbledon women's singles semi final, and the 2025 Wimbledon women's singles final.
Paula Vieira Souza	Brazil	2017	WTA umpire; First South American Gold Badge Female Umpire.

== Former ==
List of former gold-badge tennis umpires
Name	Nation	Year	Notes
Adel Aref	Tunisia	2004	Retired in 2008, later worked as director of marketing for Qatar Tennis Federation, PR director for BeIN Sports, director of cabinet of the president at Paris Saint-Germain football club and from 2023 managed Ons Jabeur.
Ali Nili	USA (formerly Iran)	2008	ATP umpire and supervisor; Officiated the 2015 Wimbledon men's singles final and the 2016 and 2019 US Open men's singles final. ATP Supervisor.
Andreas Egli	Switzerland		ITF Grand Slam Supervisor. Supervisor of Australian Open, Roland Garros, The Championship Wimbledon, US Open. As a supervisor, he was involved as a consultant in the decision to disqualify Novak Djokovic in the 2020 US Open.
Anne Lasserre Ullrich	France		First French woman to chair men's matches at Grand Slams.
Bertie Bowron	Great Britain		
Bruno Rebeuh	France	1989	Obtained his international certification in 1988 and became one of the first 6 professional tennis umpires in 1989 (first professional Chair umpire in France). Officiated on 10 consecutive French Open Finals (1989-1998), including Chang-Edberg in 1989, 2 Australian Open Finals (1991), 2 Olympic finals (1992, 2000), and 10 Davis Cup Finals. He retired from Officiating in 2001.
Carlos Bernardes	Brazil	1990	Former ATP umpire (retired in 2024); Officiated the 2006 and 2008 US Open men's singles final, the 2011 Wimbledon men's singles final and the 2016 ATP World Tour Finals final. During the Wawrinka-Cobolli first-round match in Shanghai 2024, he made an error in counting when Wawrinka was serving in the third set second game, calling 0-30 instead of 15-all, that went unnoticed and led Cobolli to break Wawrinka's serve and eventually win the match. After thirty plus years of umpiring, Carlos retired during the 2024 Davis Cup Finals in Malaga.
Carlos Ramos	Portugal	1990–2023	Officiated the men's singles final at the 2012 Olympic Games, as well as the men's singles final at all 4 Grand Slam tournaments including the 2016 Australian Open men's singles final, 2007 Wimbledon – Men's singles final, and the 2018 US Open women's singles final. ("Umpire Golden Slam").
Cecil Hollins	USA		
Cédric Mourier	France	1999	ATP umpire and referee; officiated the 2001 French Open men's singles, 2004 French Open men's singles, 2006 French Open men's singles, 2010 French Open men's singles and 2013 French Open men's singles finals. Retired in 2018. Now an ATP Supervisor.
Christina Olausson	Denmark		Umpire. Officiated 1 Wimbledon singles final.
Damian Steiner	Argentina	2005	ATP full-time umpire. Officiated the 2019 Wimbledon men's singles final. He was fired by the ATP for breaking the official's code of conduct in August 2019.
David Littlefield	USA		
Denis Overberg	Australia	1998	ATP umpire. Umpired Australian Open finals 1999, 2000, 2001, 2003. Umpired Olympic Games 1996, 2000.
Donna Kelso	Australia		WTA Supervisor, GS Supervisor. Umpired Australian Open finals 1993, 1994, 1995, 1997, 1998 US Open 1997 Umpired the Olympic Games Women's final 1996.
Emmanuel Joseph	France	2005	WTA umpire; Officiated the 2006, 2008, and 2015 French Open women's singles finals. He is still active but he was demoted to Silver Badge Chair Umpire in 2024.
Enric Molina	Spain		Officiated the 2012 Wimbledon Men's singles final and former Chief of Officiating.
Fabián Cherny	Argentina	1997	He was the only South American Chair Umpire at the 1996 Summer Olympics event. Worked the Australian, US and French Opens and several Davis Cup ties. He umpired the only tennis match where Marcelo Ríos played as number one of the world, Ríos-Gumy in a 1998 Davis Cup American zone match between Argentina and Chile.
Félix Torralba	Spain	2013	Former WTA Umpire. Now working for the WTA Mallorca Tournament.
Fiona Edwards	Great Britain		
Frank Hammond	USA		
Freddie Sore	Great Britain		He was the longest-serving umpire at Wimbledon; over 40 years.
Gabriel Mato	Spain		Officiated while an elected member of the Parliament of the Canary Islands, later a Member of the European Parliament.
George Grime	UK		Five Wimbledon Finals 1982, 1986, 1989, 1990, 1992. Davis Cup Finals 1984 and 1986 as chair umpire. 1988 as referee.
Georgina Clark	Great Britain		First female umpire to officiate a Grand Slam final (Wimbledon 1984).
Gerry Armstrong	Great Britain	1987	ATP Supervisor; Assistant Referee of The Championship, Wimbledon.
Jake Garner	USA	2007	18 Grand Slam finals, four Davis Cup finals, a Fed Cup final and the men's gold-medal match at the 2008 Beijing Olympic Games. Officiated the 2007, 2009, 2012, 2013, 2014, 2017 US Open Men's finals, the 2011, 2015, 2018 Australian Open Men's finals, the 2010 and 2016 Wimbledon Men's Final, and 2008 Olympic Games Men's singles final. Retired in 2018. Now Chief of Umpire at the US Open and senior manager for the USTA.
Jane Harvey	Great Britain		Umpired 5 Wimbledon singles finals, 4 Olympic Gold medal finals, and first female to umpire a World Group Davis Cup. Over 10 years as a full-time official.
Jaume Campistol	Spain		ITF umpire; Officiated the 2020 US Open women's singles final and the 2024 Australian Open women's singles final. Retired in after the end of the 2024 season.
Javier Moreno	Spain		ITF full-time official.
Jeremy Shales	Great Britain		Now deceased.
John Frame	Great Britain		Umpired 7 Wimbledon Finals, including 3 men's singles.
John Parry	Great Britain		As a Chief Umpire for WTA and ATP Tour now.
Jorge Dias	Portugal		First of three top Portuguese officials, opened the path to two current top officials, Carlos Ramos and Carlos Sanchez.
Kerrilyn Cramer	Australia		Officiating several time Australian Open Ladies Single Final match.
Lars Graff	Sweden	1990	ATP Supervisor. Umpired the 2009 Wimbledon Final. While umpiring in the 2003 Wimbledon match, Greg Rusedski was fined £1500 for an obscene outburst.
Laura Ceccarelli	Italy		WTA Supervisor.
Leanne White	Australia		Umpired Australian Open finals 1996, 1999.
Lynn Welch	USA		Retired and not associated with tennis officiating
Mariana Alves	Portugal		WTA umpire; Officiated the 2010 Wimbledon women's singles final and the 2007 WTA Finals final. Also officiate 2019 WTA Finals final at Shenzhen in her last career match. Now a WTA supervisor. She umpired the Capriati-Williams match in the 2004 US Open, where the wrong calls prompted the introduction of the Hawk-eye system.
Mike Morrissey	Great Britain		Umpired Wimbledon's final. ITF Head of Officiating 1993 to 2007. Only official to have held all 3 gold badges simultaneously (chair umpire, chief umpire, referee).
Nacho Forcadell	Spain	2019	ATP Umpire from 2011-2025; became an ATP Supervisor in 2026.
Norm Chryst	USA	1991	Officiated the 2004 US Open Final.
Pascal Maria	France	2000	ITF umpire; officiated on 9 Davis Cup Finals and 14 Grand Slam singles finals, including in 2008 Wimbledon Championships Men's final, 2009 and 2012 Australian Open Men's final, 2009, 2014 and 2017 French Open Men's final, 2016 French Open Women's Final and 2016 Olympic Games men's singles Final. Retired in 2017.
Richard Ings	Australia	1986	Full-time official. (See below).
Robert Norton	Great Britain	1986	Wimbledon Umpire.
Roland Herfel	Germany		ATP umpire and supervisor. Defaulted, after being called on-court by chair umpire Greg Allensworth, Shapovalov in his quarterfinals match at the Citi Washington ATP versus Shelton, for allegedly swearing at a person in the crowd.
Romano Grillotti	Italy		Umpired several finals at the heart of Rome, in the traditional ATP Masters.
Sandra de Jenken	France	2001	She officiated a total of 13 Grand Slam Finals and 4 Fed Cup Finals. First woman to officiate a Grand Slam Men's Single Final Match (Roland Garros) and a Davis Cup Final (Croatia-Slovakia, 2005). She retired in 2007.
Wayne McKewen	Australia		Umpired 10 consecutive Australian Open Men's Singles Finals in a row from 1992-2001, stopped umpiring in 2005. 2005-Present Australian Tournament Referee, Grand Slam Supervisor of Roland Garros, The Championships Wimbledon and US Open. Has Officiated at over 150 Grand Slams.

== ATP Tour officials ==
The original 8 full-time world officials for the (then new) 1990 ATP Tour

- Dana Loconto (USA). Dana produced the first ever device to digitalize umpiring, the ATP palm-top. He was overruled by ITF Supervisor Ken Farrar in the 1996 US Open, during the Ríos-Tarango match.
- Gerry Armstrong (Great Britain). Gerry defaulted Mc Enroe in the 1990 Australian Open, after the rules had just been modified. ITF Supervisor Ken Farrar was called on court to confirm the new ruling.
- Paulo Pereira (Brazil). Paulo obtained a degree in civil engineering before moving full-time into the officiating world.
- Pedro Bravo (Chile). Pedro was a tennis teacher before umpiring. He worked for the Chilean Tennis Federation as Tournament Director. Now deceased.
- Richard Ings (Australia). Richard defaulted Robert Seguso in a match versus Andre Agassi at the 1989 Indian Wells ATP Tournament.
- Richard Kaufman (USA). After retirement, Richard became Director of Officials for the USTA and worked closely to Paul Hawkins to develop the Hawk-Eye system.
- Rudy Berger (Germany). Rudy worked in the Ministry of Justice in former West-Germany before becoming a full-time official. Deceased in 2007.
- Steve Ullrich (USA). Steve had a distinct voice that allowed tennis spectators to easily identify him when on the chair.
