= Nouni =

Nouni may refer to:

- Kader Nouni, French tennis umpire
- Nõuni, village in Estonia
