= Gerry Armstrong =

Gerry Armstrong may refer to:

- Gerry Armstrong (activist) (born 1946), critic and former member of the Church of Scientology
- Gerry Armstrong (footballer) (born 1954), Northern Irish footballer
- Gerry Armstrong (tennis official) (born 1955), English tennis official

== See also ==
- Jerry Armstrong (born 1936), American boxer
