= Alison Lang =

Alison Lang may refer to:

- Alison Hughes (born 1971/72), née Lang, British tennis umpire
- Alison Lang (basketball), Canadian basketball player
- Alison Lang (writer), Gaelic writer
