= Lahyani =

Lahyani is a surname. Notable people with the surname include:

- Firas Lahyani (born 1991), Tunisian basketball player
- Mohamed Lahyani (born 1966), Swedish tennis umpire
