= Adel Aref =

Tunisian referee and sports executive

- Born: 2 March 1980 (age 46)
- Education: Bachelor from Lycée Français La Marsa Tunis/ International Business School Dubai Knowledge Village

Adel Aref (born 2 March 1980) is a French-Tunisian former international tennis umpire and sports executive. He has also served as Director of Cabinet of the President at Paris Saint Germain Football Club and PR Director for BeIN Sports.

== Early life ==
Adel Aref was born on 2 March 1980, in Tunis, Tunisia, to Mokhtar Aref and Fatma Dhouib Aref. The family moved to London when he was five, with his two brothers, Mehdi and Bechir Aref. He holds a bachelor's degree from Lycée Gustave-Flaubert (La Marsa) and a master's degree from International Business School Dubai Knowledge Village.

== Career ==
=== International tennis refereeing ===
Upon returning to Tunisia at the age of ten, Aref joined the Tennis Club of Tunis and eventually became interested in refereeing. When he was 16, International Tennis Federation (ITF) executives spotted him on the tennis club courts, where an injury prevented him from playing, and offered him a scholarship.

Over the course of his career, Aref officiated over 2000 matches all over the world. ITF awarded him the Gold Badge for the highest level of refereeing at the age of 24, making him the youngest professional referee in the sport. A position was then offered to him at the Qatar Tennis Federation.

He umpired games at the world's most prestigious tennis tournaments, officiating 30 events per year on ATP and WTA Tours. Aref was responsible for training all of the tennis officials to Olympic standard in the lead-up to both the Athens and Beijing Olympic games. During his career, he officiated seven Grand Slam finals, including the Australian Open, Roland Garros, Wimbledon, the US Open and three Olympic Games (Sydney 2000, Athens 2004, Beijing 2008).

At the 2006 Davis Cup, a heated encounter with a young Andy Murray made headlines after Murray insulted Aref during a doubles match against Serbia and Montenegro, protesting a decision he felt was unjust. Murray was fined $2,500. The two would eventually reconcile after an apology from Murray two years later. That same year, he became Director of Officiating of Africa and the Middle East – overseeing over a hundred officials.

Aref retired from umpiring in 2008 at the age of 28 following four years of officiating at the top level.

=== Qatar ===
In 2008, Adel became the Director of Marketing, Branding, and Player Services at the Qatar Tennis Federation (QTF). Aref worked on events for the ATP, WTA and ITF. He also led the marketing campaigns for Sony Ericsson Championships Doha 2008–2010, Qatar ExxonMobil Open and Qatar Ladies Open.

In 2011, Aref organized Roger Federer and Rafael Nadal's exhibition game in Doha in 2011. As part of the Qatar ExxonMobil Open, he invited superstar players to hit tennis balls on a court laid in Doha Bay waters to launch the 2011 ATP World Tour season.

In 2022, Aref was selected by BeIN Sports to be their PR and Event director. He led PR campaigns for the 2022 FIFA World Cup, which was hosted in Qatar.

=== Paris Saint-Germain ===
Aref served as chief of staff of the president of the PSG and was responsible for selecting who would be hosted at the Carré du Parc, which has seen French national stars such as Patrick Bruel, Jamel Debbouze, Francis Huster, Gérard Darmon, Enrico Macias and Jean-Paul Belmondo invited.

=== Management of Ons Jabeur ===
In January 2023, Jabeur announced joining Naomi Osaka’s agency Evolve and bringing on Aref as her manager, who she described as a friend she known for a long time. Jabeur was the runner-up at Wimbledon in 2023.

=== Other ===
Aref is the CEO of AASolutions, an agency specialized in personal branding, business networking, luxury events and artistic careers management. The company's client reportedly includes brands like Victoria's Secret, Galerie Lafayette les Champs Elysées, Elie Saab, Cannes Festival, The Voice, Qatar Tennis Federation, UEFA Champions League, Paris Saint-Germain, BeIN Sports and the FIFA World Cup Qatar 2022.

Aref is an ambassador for the DARNA association, which supports orphans.
