= Lake Nõuni =

Lake in Estonia

- Nõuni järv (Estonian)
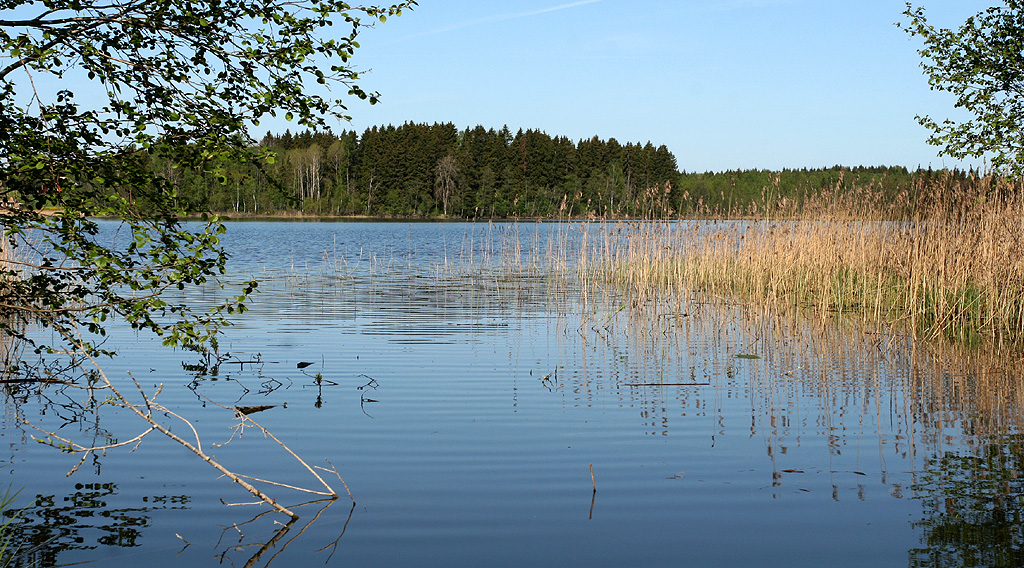

- Location within Estonia
- Location: Nõuni, Otepää Parish, Valga County, Estonia
- Coordinates: 58.1256°N 26.5122°E
- Basin countries: Estonia
- Max. length: 1,830 meters (6,000 ft)
- Surface area: 83.3 hectares (206 acres)
- Average depth: 6.2 meters (20 ft)
- Max. depth: 15.4 meters (51 ft)
- Water volume: 5,103,000 cubic meters (180,200,000 cu ft)
- Shore length^{1}: 6,150 meters (20,180 ft)
- Surface elevation: 108.6 meters (356 ft)
- ^{1} Shore length is not a well-defined measure.

Lake Nõuni (Estonian: Nõuni järv or Suur Nõuni järv) is a lake in Estonia. It is located in the village of Nõuni, Otepää Parish, Valga County.

== Physical description ==
The lake has an area of 83.3 hectares (206 acres). The lake has an average depth of 6.2 meters (20 ft) and a maximum depth of 15.4 meters (51 ft). It is 1,830 meters (6,000 ft) long, and its shoreline measures 6,150 meters (20,180 ft). It has a volume of 5,103,000 cubic meters (180,200,000 cu ft).

== See also ==
- List of lakes of Estonia
