= Ali Nili =

Iranian-American tennis official (born 1978)

- علی نیلی
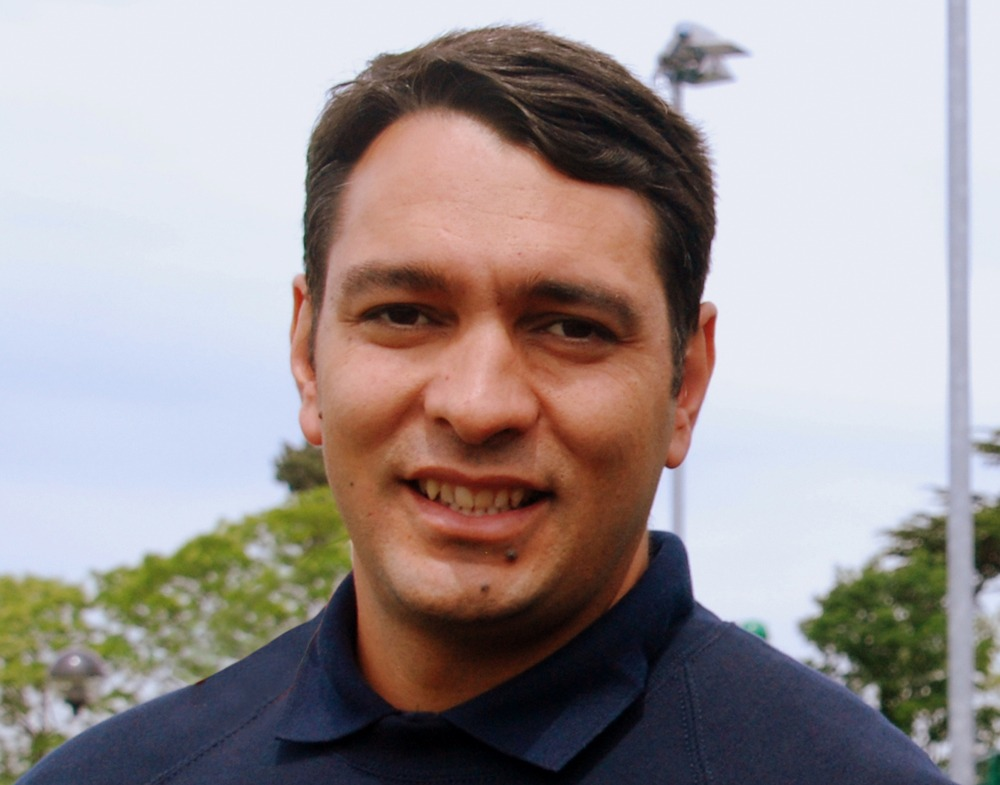
- Born: May 26, 1978 (age 47)
- Occupations: Senior Director, Officiating Administration
- Years active: 1998-present
- Organization: ATP (Association of Tennis Professionals)

Ali Nili (Persian: علی نیلی, born 26 May 1978) is an Iranian-American tennis official who has a gold badge chair umpire certified by the International Tennis Federation.

In 2008, he became the first Asian tennis chair umpire to attain the esteemed Gold Badge chair umpire certification (one of 26 in the world), certified by the joint certification panel of ITF/ATP/WTA/GS.

Noteworthy matches he chaired include the 2015 Wimbledon men's singles finals featuring Roger Federer and Novak Djokovic, the 2016 US Open men's singles finals between Novak Djokovic and Stan Wawrinka, and the 2019 US Open men's singles finals featuring Rafael Nadal and Daniil Medvedev. Ali also umpired two ATP year-end singles finals in 2018 and 2019, the latter being his last match as a chair umpire.

He retired as chair umpire in 2019 and transitioned into an ATP supervisor and currently managing the ATP chair umpires and supervisors.

== Early life ==
Nili was born in 1978 in Tehran, Iran. He played competitive tennis as a junior and was ranked in the top 20 juniors in Iran. While pursuing a Mechanical Engineering degree at Tehran Azad University, he intermittently resided in the US.

== Career ==
Nili's journey in tennis officiating began in 1997 when he assisted in organizing the West Asian Games in Tehran supervised by ITF referee, Hany El Khafief from Dubai. Hany invited Nili as a line umpire to work at the Dubai Open the following year, marking the start of his officiating career. In November 1998, he obtained his White badge in Tunisia, leading to his full-time officiating role from 1999. Over the years, he achieved successive milestones, obtaining his Bronze badge three years later, followed by the Silver badge in 2006.

He achieved Gold badge status in 2008, marking him as the first Gold badge chair umpire from Asia. Nili's portfolio encompasses high-profiles matches, at both Grand Slam and ATP tournaments, as well as the Rio 2016 summer Olympics. He retired as a chair umpire in 2019, transitioning into a senior officiating administrator role.

== Awards ==
In 2017, Nili received the US John T. McGovern Umpires Award from the United States Tennis Association for outstanding contribution to tennis officiating.

In a piece, appeared on the US Open website on September 4, Iran's Nili is described as the one 'has continually worked his way up through events, delivering the highest quality of officiating and serving as a role model to his colleagues.
