= Alison Hughes =

British tennis umpire

Alison Dorothy Hughes MBE
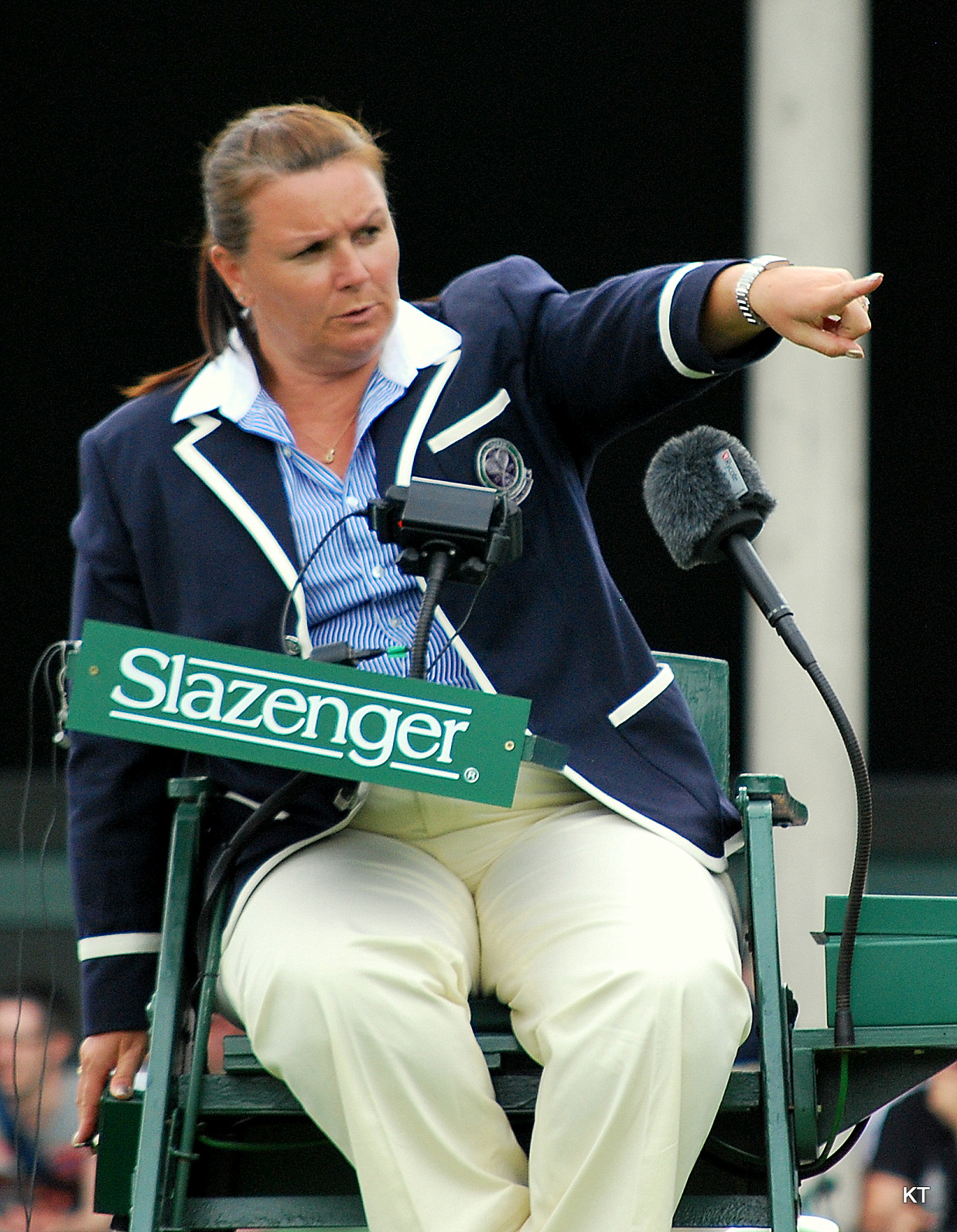
- Alison Hughes umpiring during the 2012 Wimbledon Championships.
- Born: Alison Lang; 1971 or 1972 (age 54–55); Newcastle upon Tyne, England
- Occupation: Tennis umpire
- Years active: 1993–present

Alison Dorothy Hughes MBE (née Lang; born 1971/1972) is a British tennis umpire who has umpired in multiple women's Grand Slam tennis finals, as well as in the Davis Cup, Fed Cup and at the 2004, 2008, 2016 and 2020 Summer Olympics.

== Personal life ==
Lang was born in Newcastle upon Tyne, North East England. She represented Northumberland in U-18s tennis competitions. She currently lives in Warsash, Hampshire.

== Umpiring career ==
Lang began umpiring in 1991, starting with junior matches in North East England. She made her Wimbledon debut in 1993. Lang has officiated the finals of all Grand slam tournaments. In 2003, she received the International Tennis Federation Gold Badge status, the highest honor for a tennis umpire. In 2011, Lang was named the Lawn Tennis Association's Official of the Year.

In 2003, Lang umpired at the Wimbledon Championships for the first time. She was an umpire at the 2004 and 2008 Summer Olympics. Whilst umpiring the 2015 Australian Open women's final between Serena Williams and Maria Sharapova, Hughes invoked the "hindrance rule" against Williams for shouting "C'mon" just as Sharapova was trying to return the ball. In the same year, Hughes umpired the women's singles finals at Wimbledon for the sixth time, as well as the Fed Cup final between the Czech Republic and Russia. It was her twelfth Fed Cup final, and she was part of the first ever all-female officiating team at a Fed Cup final. In 2016, Hughes umpired a US Open match between Marcos Baghdatis and Gaël Monfils, and gave Baghdatis a formal warning for using his mobile phone during the changeover time. She umpired the final of the 2017 Australian Open, which was the last final contested between sisters Serena and Venus Williams.

Hughes umpired the men's final of the 2018 US Open between Novak Djokovic and Juan Martin del Potro. During the match, she gave Djokovic a code violation warning for exceeding the shot clock. She was the third female umpire to officiate a men's Grand Slam final, after Sandra de Jenken and Eva Asderaki. At the 2021 Australian Open, Hughes argued with Karolína Plíšková after Hughes gave Plíšková two warnings for smashing racquets. Plíšková argued that as the second incident happened in the players' tunnel, it should not have been under Hughes' jurisdiction. She later umpired the Australia Open women's final between Naomi Osaka and Jennifer Brady; it was the 22nd Grand Slam final that she had officiated.

== Honours ==
Hughes was appointed Member of the Order of the British Empire (MBE) in the 2021 Birthday Honours for services to tennis.
