= Nõuni =

Village in Estonia

- village
- Location in Estonia
- Coordinates: 58°08′15″N 26°31′14″E
- Country: Estonia
- County: Valga County
- Municipality: Otepää Parish

Population (01.01.2011)
  - Total: 259

Nõuni is a village in Otepää Parish, Valga County, in southeastern Estonia. It is located about 8 km (5 mi) north of the town of Otepää, along the road from Tatra to Sangaste (road no. 46). Nõuni has a population of 259 (as of 1 January 2011).

Lake Nõuni is located in the village. Since 1763, an elementary school has operated on the shore of the lake.

== Gallery ==
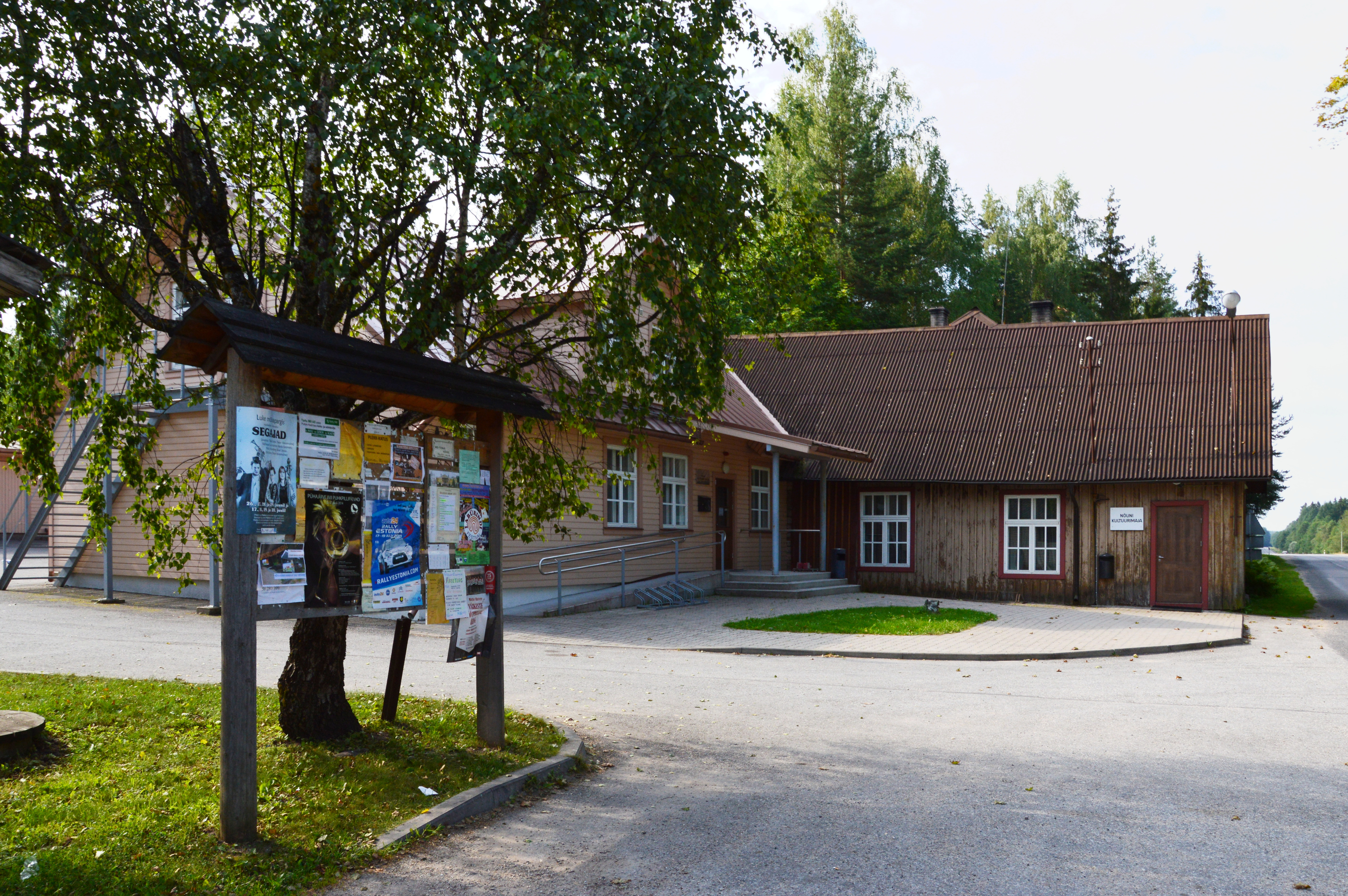
Nõuni cultural center

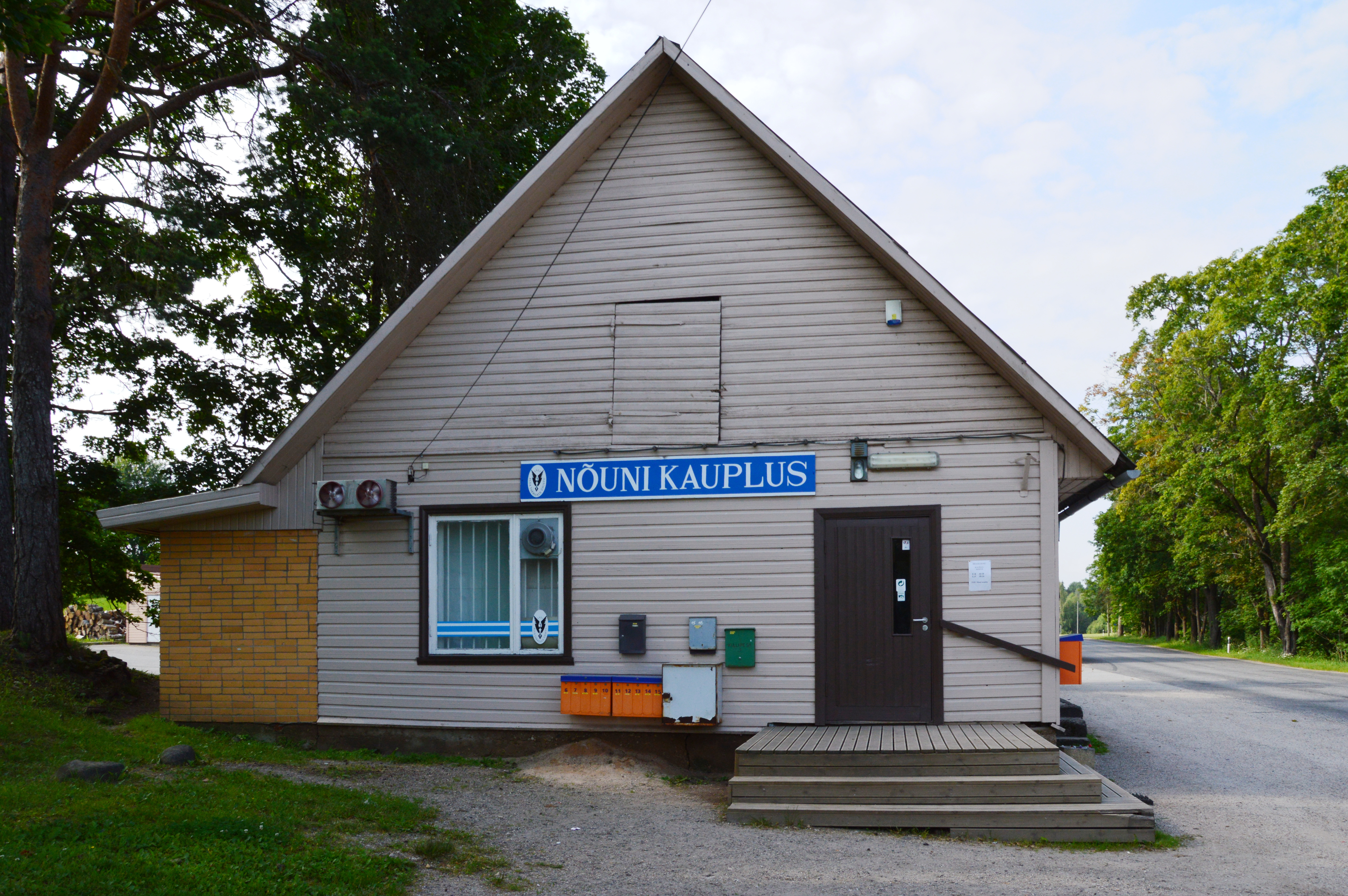
Nõuni shop

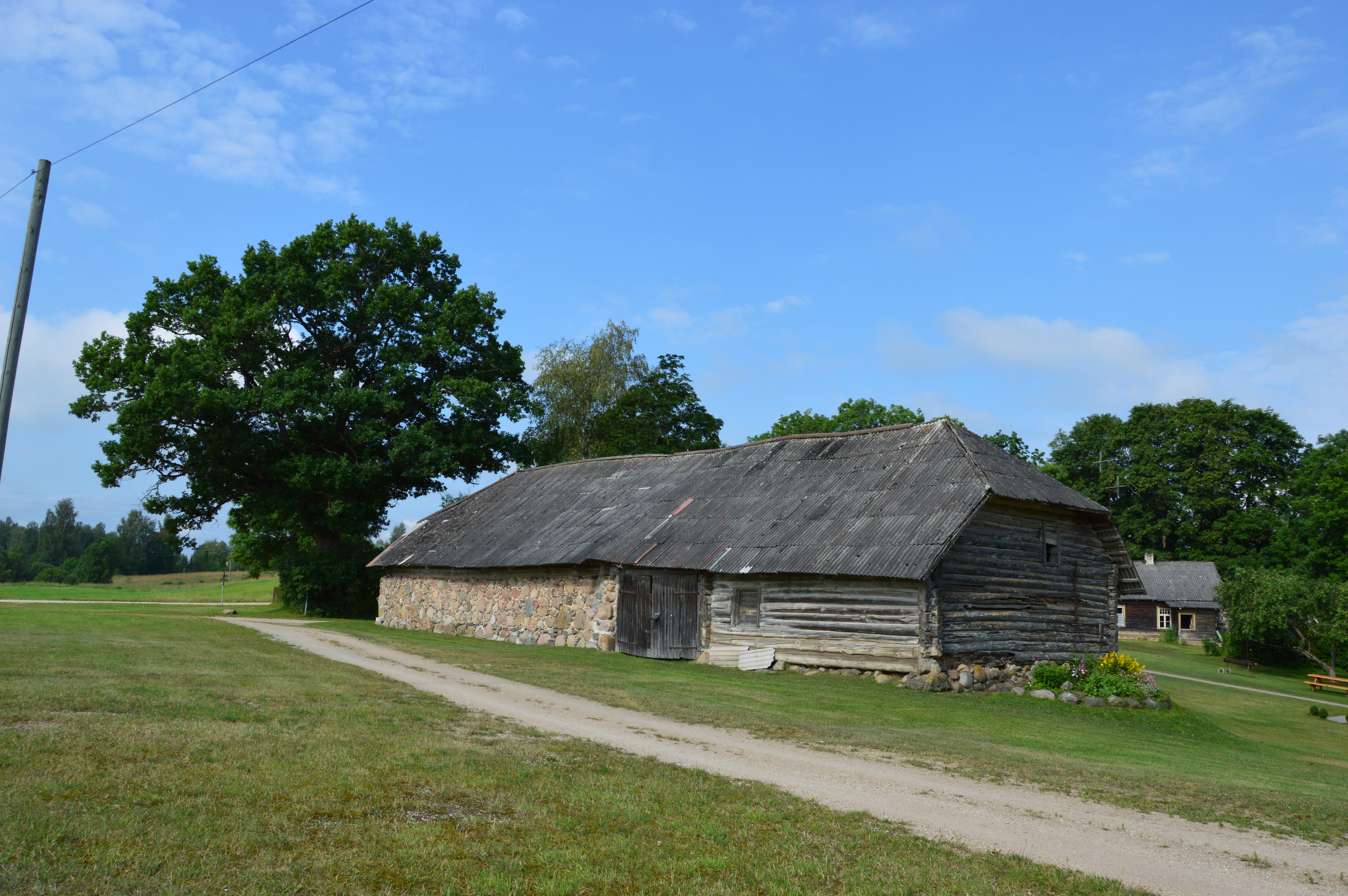
Old farmhouse

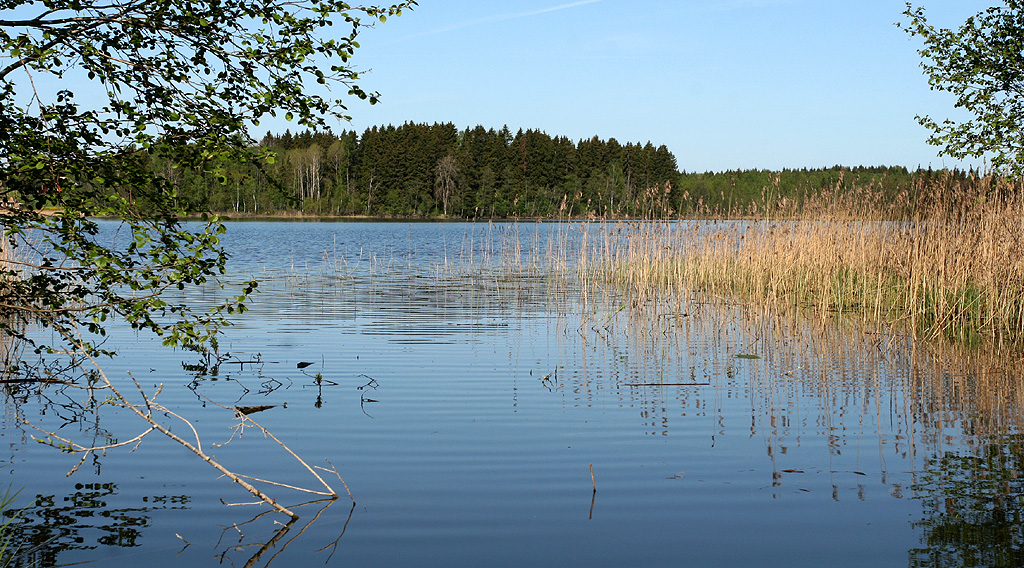
Lake Nõuni
