= Kader Nouni =

French tennis umpire (born 1976)

- Nouni at the 2022 Transylvania Open
- Born: 23 February 1976 (age 50); Perpignan, France
- Occupation: Tennis umpire
- Years active: 2005–present
- Spouse: Melanie Conesa (m. 2010)
- Children: 2

Kader Nouni (born 23 February 1976) is a French tennis umpire. He works primarily for the Women's Tennis Association (WTA) and has officiated six major finals. The International Tennis Federation (ITF) certified him as a gold badge umpire in 2007. Known for his baritone voice, Nouni is sometimes called the "Barry White of tennis".

== Early life ==
Nouni was born to Algerian-French immigrants on 23 February 1976. He grew up in the Haut Vernet quarter of Perpignan, in southern France. Nouni and his older brother were raised in public housing by a single mother after his father died when he was two.

Nouni and his brother took up tennis in the wake of Frenchman Yannick Noah's victory at the 1983 French Open. Costs associated with tennis (lessons, court rental, etc.) meant Nouni needed to work from a young age; by age nine, he strung rackets, swept the court lines, and did other jobs at a local tennis club. Local tournaments hired him to officiate adult matches from age 12. Nouni recalled that despite his youth, early on he got positive feedback from players for his umpiring skills. Nouni developed his trademark deep voice by his mid-teens; he recalled an incident when a girlfriend's father did not believe that he was only sixteen because of his voice over the phone.

== Career ==
As a 16-year-old, Nouni got his first major umpiring experience as a line judge at the 1992 French Open, after having been recognized for good officiating at a junior tennis event held the previous year at the Roland Garros stadium complex in Paris. Before dedicating himself to officiating, Nouni briefly studied sociology at the university level.

Nouni worked his way as a chair umpire from qualifying competitions, to the main draws of WTA and Association of Tennis Professionals (ATP) events, to Grand Slams. He became a full-time umpire in 2005; in off-seasons past, Nouni sometimes supplemented his income by working in bars in his hometown of Perpignan. He earned ITF accreditation over time: his white badge (Level 2) in 1998, bronze badge (Level 3) in 2002, silver badge in 2004, and gold badge (highest level) in 2007. He joined the WTA Tour exclusively in 2008, but still sometimes officiates men's matches at Grand Slams.

Nouni has umpired five women's singles finals at the French Open: in 2007, 2009, 2013, 2014, and 2021. Outside of Roland Garros, the only other major final he has officiated was the 2018 Wimbledon Championships. His other high-profile matches on the WTA Tour include presiding over four season-ending WTA Finals finals.

Nouni has been involved in several notable moments of controversy. At the 2012 Australian Open, after Nouni overruled a line judge to award John Isner an ace and declined to allow a late Hawk-Eye challenge, David Nalbandian argued at length with Nouni and said postmatch that the umpire had mismanaged that moment. At the 2015 French Open, Victoria Azarenka thought she had saved a set point after a miss by Serena Williams, but because a line judge made a late incorrect call on Azarenka's previous shot, Nouni had the players replay the point (instead of awarding it to Azarenka outright). At the 2023 French Open, Nouni missed a double bounce on Holger Rune's side and then penalised Francisco Cerúndolo for stopping mid-court as a ball kid began to run on, also thinking the point was over.

== Recognition ==
Nouni's deep baritone voice, fashion sense, and personality have helped make him one of the most famous tennis umpires today. The Guardian writes, "With his smoky tones, he's been praised for having the best voice in tennis". Other sources describe his tone as "honeyed", "resonant and melodic", "seductive", and "soothing", and note his thick French accent. Nouni's pronunciation of "deuce" is especially striking to some fans. John McEnroe once joked, "[Nouni]'s got the great voice, I'll give him that ... He's an argument for smoking cigarettes if you're an umpire". Nouni used to worry that his voice could distract from his job, noting "We always say that a good official is someone that we don't talk about", but has since come to appreciate the fan interest. Because of his deep voice, he is sometimes referred to as the "Barry White of tennis".

== Personal life ==
Nouni met his wife, Melanie Conesa, in 2010. They have two children. As of 2018, when Nouni is not traveling, he lives with his family in Perpignan.
