= Official (tennis) =

Person who acts as referee at tennis

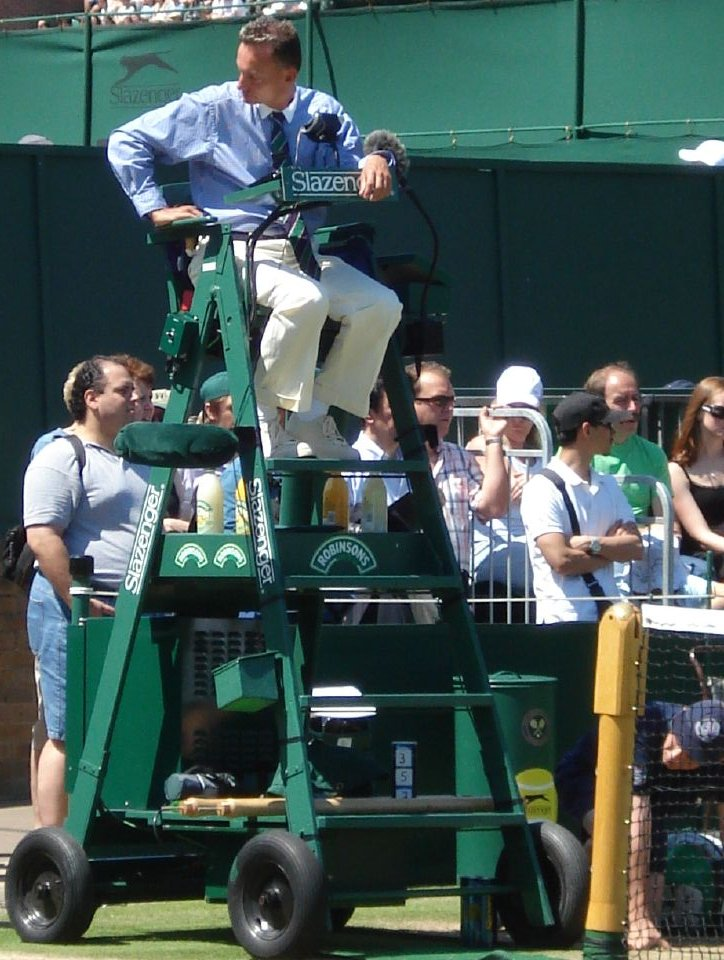
Australian chair umpire Scott Ray positions himself prior to a match at Wimbledon

In tennis, an official is a person who ensures that a match or tournament is conducted according to the International Tennis Federation Rules of Tennis and other competition regulations.

At the highest levels of the sport, a team of up to eleven officials may be on court at any given time. These officials are broken up into categories based on their responsibility during the match. Contrastingly, many tennis matches are conducted with no officials present directly on court.

== Certification ==
Tennis officials are certified by their respective national associations. The ITF also certifies officials in the categories of the chair umpire, referee and a chief umpire. Each ITF certification or "badge" is broken into five certification levels. The first, green badge, is considered sufficient for officiating at the highest levels of tennis within the official's own nation and is not divided into categories (and is primarily used in Spanish- and French-speaking areas, where a national organization may not be present). The second, the white badge, is divided into three categories (chair, chief, and referee) but remains only a national certification. The following three, bronze (chair umpire only), silver, and gold badge are considered international certifications. These international officials are those seen at the highest levels of play like the Grand Slams, ATP and WTA Tours, and the Fed and Davis Cups.

== Chair umpire ==
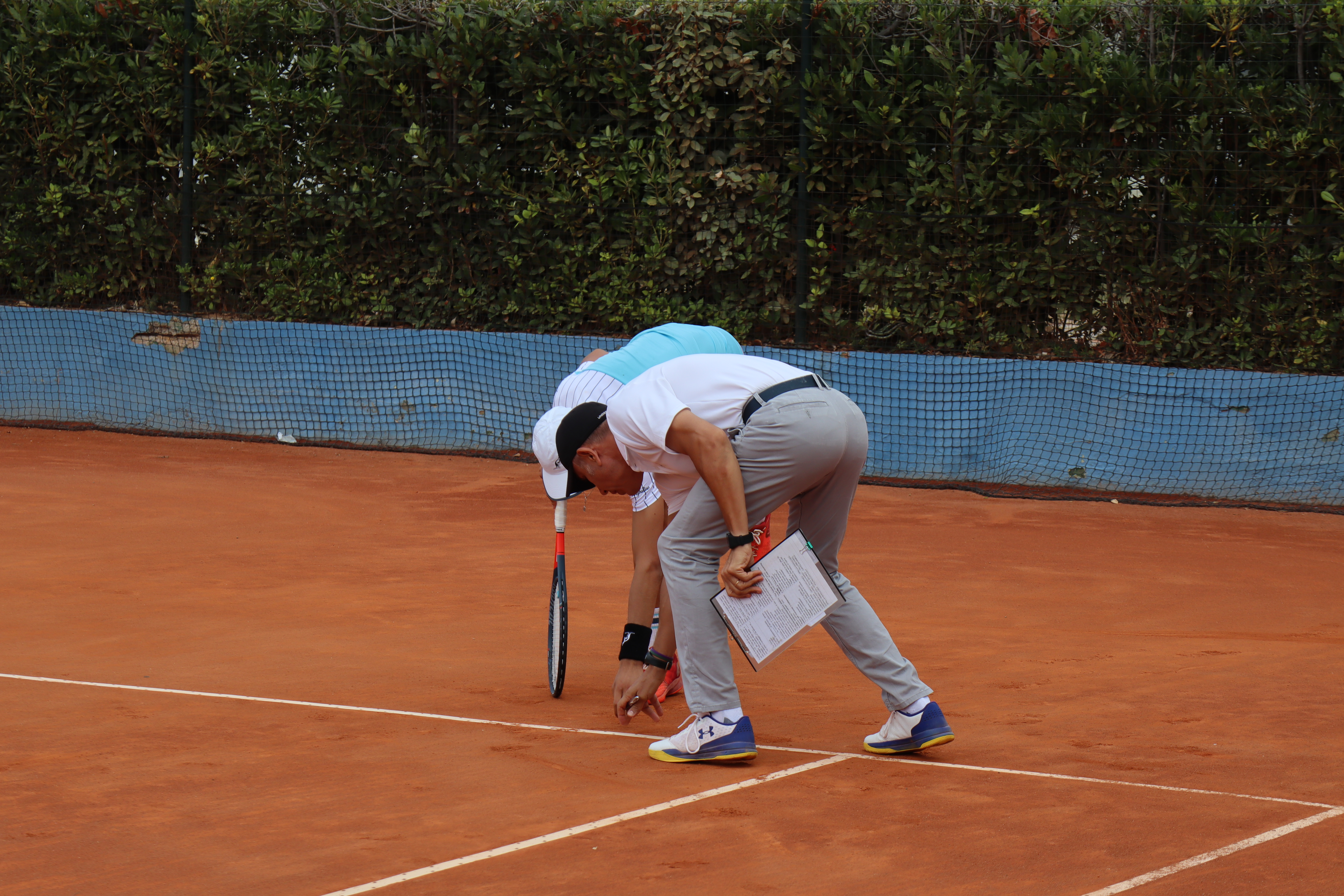
A chair umpire checks the mark of the ball on clay.

The chair umpire is the final authority on all questions of fact during the match. Questions of fact include whether a ball was in, the calling of a service let or the calling of a foot-fault. In matches where line umpires are also assigned, the chair umpire has the right to overrule if a clear mistake has been made. The chair umpire is often situated in a tall chair at the centre of the court, behind a net post. The players' benches are to either side of the chair. From this position, the chair umpire calls the score of the match to the players and spectators between points. At the conclusion of a point, game, or set, the chair umpire times the players to ensure they follow ITF regulations on pace of play. The chair umpire is responsible for completing a scorecard, the official historical record of the match.

== Line umpire ==
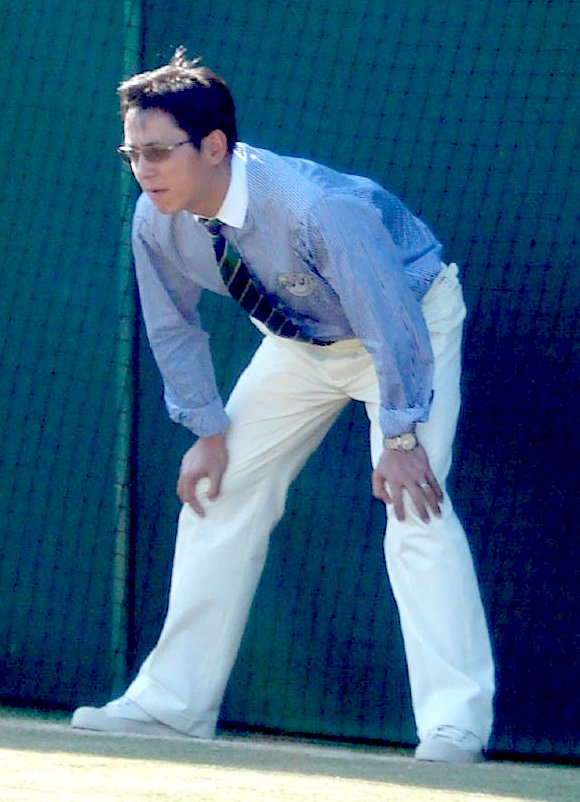
A line umpire stands at a ready position, focusing on his assigned line.

The line umpire (or line judge) "calls all shots relating to the assigned lines." Line umpires work on court as part of a team of between one and nine line umpires. Each line umpire is assigned to one line or, in the case of a short-handed crew, a position in a system. For example, a line umpire on the receiver's side may have to cover the center service line then, following the service, move to one of the sidelines.

The line umpire signals a ball out by making a verbal "out" call ("fault" for a serve) followed by the extension of the arm shoulder high in the direction the ball was out. A ball is signalled "safe" or "good" by holding both hands together knee-high in front of the body. A line umpire who is unable to call a shot (usually because a player obstructs their view) signals this by holding their hands beside their head, the upper side pointing in the same direction as the eyes; that call is then the chair umpire's responsibility. Line umpires are also responsible for calling foot faults. When baseline umpires are being used, they watch to see if the server touches any part of the baseline before the ball is struck. Center service line umpires are responsible for calling foot faults when the server steps over the imaginary extension of the centerline. Footfault calls are made with a verbal "Footfault" call followed by a vertical extension of the arm with the palm open.

To reduce staff due to COVID-19 pandemic restrictions, the 2020 US Open employed electronic line judges on most matches, excluding those held at Arthur Ashe Stadium and Louis Armstrong Stadium. At the 2021 Australian Open, all matches used electronic line judges for the first time in a Grand Slam event.

== Off-court officials ==
=== Referee ===
The referee "is the official who is responsible for assuring that the competition is fair and played under the ITF Rules of Tennis." The referee supervises all of the aspects of play at a tournament including the conduct of players, coaches, spectators, and administrative crew. The referee must be present whenever matches are being played.

The referee also "is the final authority on all questions of tennis law..." Any player may appeal the chair umpire's interpretation of tennis law to the tournament referee or deputy referee. In making the decision on an appeal the referee must consider the rulings of fact of the chair umpire, as well as statements of the players and line umpires. The referee's decision is final.

The referee is also responsible for making the tournament draw in accordance with competition regulations. The making of the draw includes determining seeds and placing players and byes. The referee must then work with tournament organizers to schedule matches. This process has been made much easier in recent years with the introduction of computer programs that complete draw sheets and schedules based on online player entries and court availability.

During play of a tournament, the referee is the sole authority on the suspension of play due to weather and other concerns.

The referee is usually only seen on court during the administration of a medical timeout. Due to the complex regulations dictating medical timeouts the referee accompanies the medical trainer onto court. The referee is present to explain procedures and regulations to the player and trainer, and to time the timeout to ensure no extra time is given, as this would be construed as an unfair advantage.

Notable tournament referees include Gerry Armstrong who has been Wimbledon referee since 2018.

=== Chief umpire ===
The chief umpire of a tournament "appoints and replaces or reassigns, when necessary, Chair Umpires, (and) Line Umpires..." Chief umpires are used primarily in large professional tournaments and are responsible for the recruitment and hiring of officials for the tournament. During the tournament, the chief umpire assigns umpires to courts, subject to overrule by the referee. The chief umpire also collects scorecards from chair umpires at the conclusion of the match and thus may furnish the media with any factual information they may request.

== List of current ITF Gold Badge chair umpires ==
=== Women ===
- Eva Asderaki-Moore (Greece)
- Aurelie Tourte (France)
- Mariana Alves (Portugal, retired)
- Miriam Bley (Germany)
- Marija Čičak (Croatia)
- Louise Azemar Engzell (Sweden)
- Katarzyna Radwan-Cho (Poland)
- Paula Vieira (Brazil)
- Alison Hughes (formerly Lang) (Great Britain)
- Juan Zhang (China)
- Marijana Veljović (Serbia)
- Cecilia Alberti (Italy)
- Julie Kjendlie (Norway)
- Kelly Rask (Formerly Thomson) (Great Britain)

=== Men ===
- Mohamed El Jennati (Morocco)
- Emmanuel Joseph (France)
- James Keothavong (Great Britain)
- Mohamed Lahyani (Sweden)
- Fergus Murphy (Ireland)
- Nico Helwerth (Germany)
- Timo Janzen (Germany)
- Richard Haigh (Great Britain)
- Kader Nouni (France)
- John Blom (Australia)
- Tom Sweeney (Australia)
- Renaud Lichtenstein (France)
- Arnaud Gabas (France)
- Pierre Bacchi (France)
- Greg Allensworth (USA)
- Jaume Campistol (Spain)
- Damien Dumusois (France)
- Adel Nour (Egypt)

== See also ==
- List of tennis umpires, current and former.
