= Eva Asderaki =

Greek tennis umpire

Eva Asderaki-Moore
- Εύα Ασδεράκη
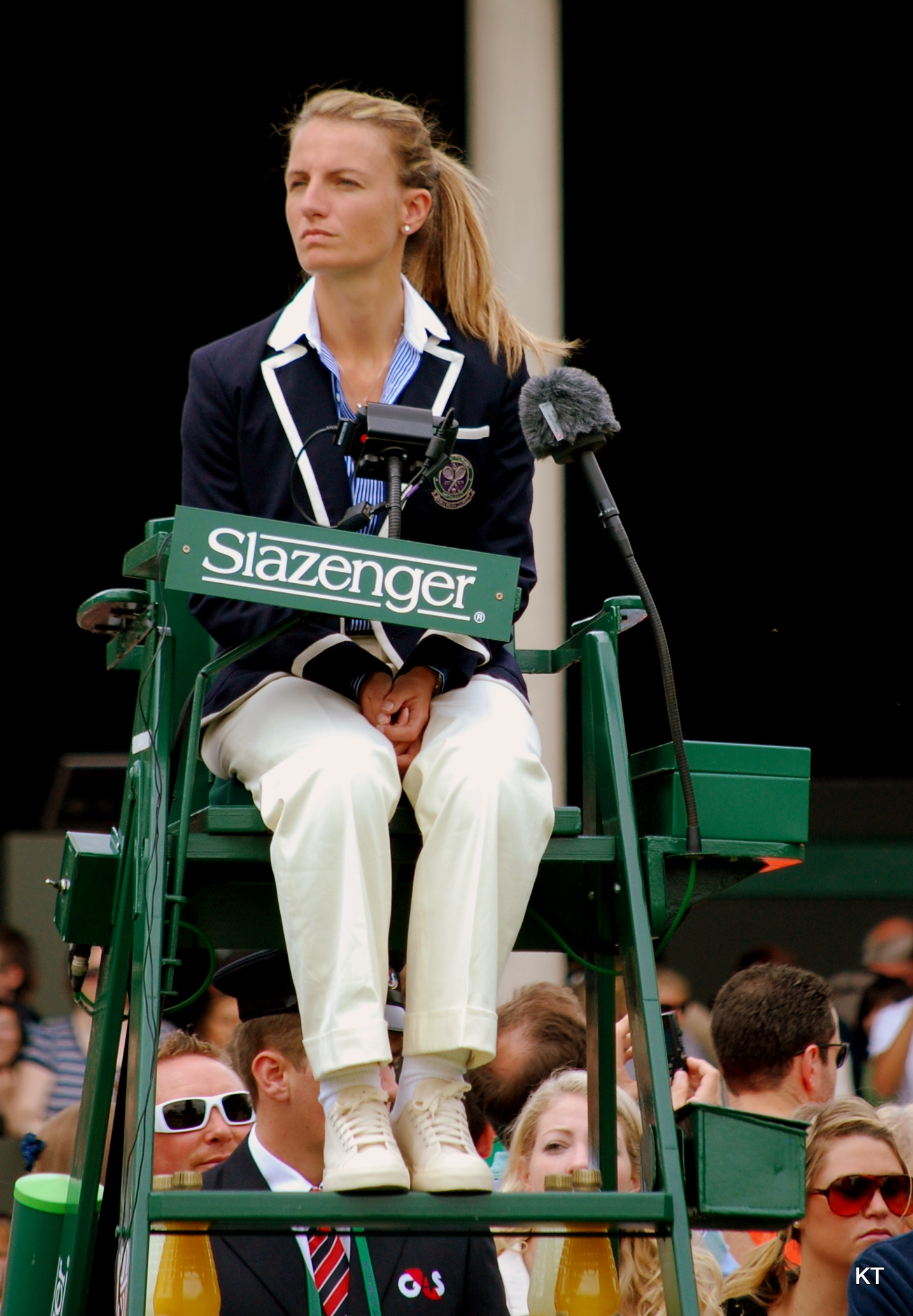
- Asderaki umpiring during the 2011 Wimbledon Championships.
- Born: Eva Asderaki; 27 January 1982 (age 44); Chalcis, Greece
- Occupation: Tennis umpire
- Years active: 2001–present

Eva Asderaki (Greek: Εύα Ασδεράκη, born 27 January 1982), also known by her married name Eva Asderaki-Moore, is a Greek tennis umpire, who has umpired international tennis matches since 2001. She has umpired at all four Grand Slam tournaments, and in 2015, she became the first woman to umpire a men's US Open tennis final.

== Personal life ==
Asderaki was born on 27 January 1982 in Chalcis, Greece. As a youngster, she started playing tennis. She was once ranked the seventh best under-16 tennis player in Greece.

Asderaki has lived in England and now lives in Australia with her husband Paul Moore. The couple married in 2012 in London, and they had their first child in July 2018.

== Career ==
Asderaki has a gold umpiring accreditation from the International Tennis Federation. She started as a line judge at her local tennis club in 1997, and she earned her first ITF umpiring badge in Thessaloniki in 2000. From 2000 to 2008, she studied umpiring in Luxembourg. She is the only current international Greek tennis umpire.

Asderaki's first professional event was in Athens in 2000. The event had a prize equivalent to around 10,000€ for the winner. Asderaki started umpiring internationally in 2001, and her first international event was in Israel. Asderaki umpired at the 2004 Summer Olympics in Athens, Greece. In 2007, she started regularly umpiring in WTA tour events.

In 2011, Asderaki umpired in the women's singles events at Wimbledon, and the US Open. During the US Open final, she had a verbal disagreement with Serena Williams, after overturning a point as Williams had shouted during the rally. Williams later said that Asderaki was "ugly on the inside", although Williams later claimed that she had mistaken Asderaki for another umpire that she had disagreed with on a previous occasion.

In 2013, Asderaki umpired the women's singles final at Wimbledon. In 2015, Asderaki became the first woman to umpire a men's US Open final when she umpired the final between Novak Djokovic and Roger Federer. Her umpiring performance was seen as so good that she was more popular than Djokovic and Federer on social media after the final, and Asderaki considers it the highlight of her career. In 2016, she umpired at the Australian Open, her home grand slam, for the first time. She umpired at the 2018 Fed Cup whilst pregnant. She umpired at the 2019 Wimbledon Championships, included the men's singles semi-final between Novak Djokovic and Roberto Bautista Agut. She umpired a 2019 US Open match between Federer and Damir Džumhur during which Džumhur was criticised for shouting at Asderaki. In 2020, Asderaki umpired the Australian Open women's singles final between Sofia Kenin and Garbiñe Muguruza.

In the 2022 Australian Open men's semifinals, Asderaki was called upon when Daniil Medvedev accused Stefanos Tsitsipas of receiving coaching from his father Apostolos in Greek. She was positioned underneath Tsitsipas's coaching box and did catch Apostolos giving coaching, allowing chair umpire Jaume Campistol to issue a coaching violation to Tsitsipas.

In 2023 Asderaki umpired the women's final at the US Open. She then umpired the men's singles final at the 2024 US Open, when Jannik Sinner defeated Taylor Fritz.
