= Mohamed Lahyani =

Swedish tennis umpire (born 1966)

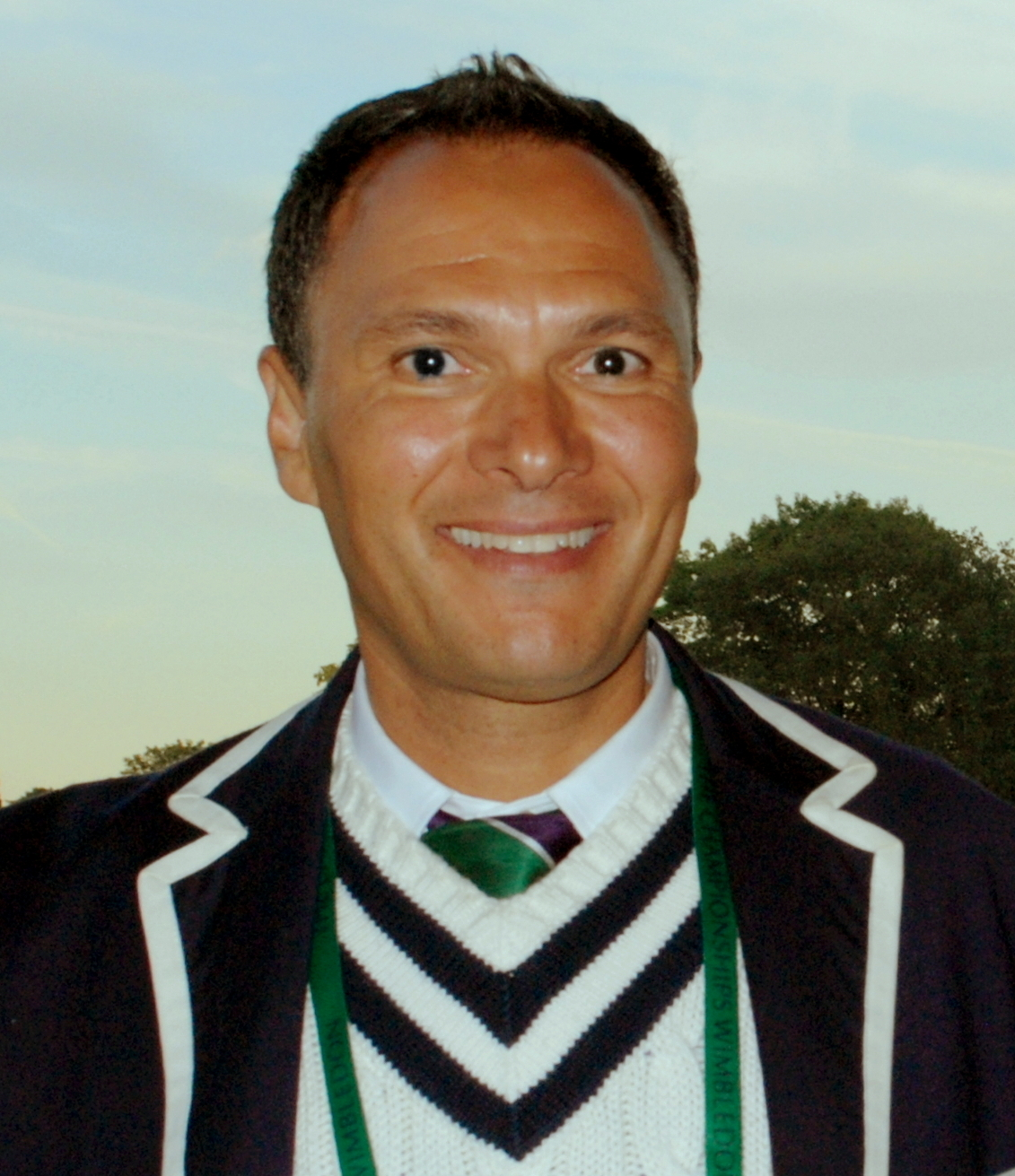
- Born: 27 June 1966 (age 58); Tafraout, Morocco
- Citizenship: Swedish
- Occupation: Gold Badge ATP Tour Chair Umpire
- Years active: 1997–present

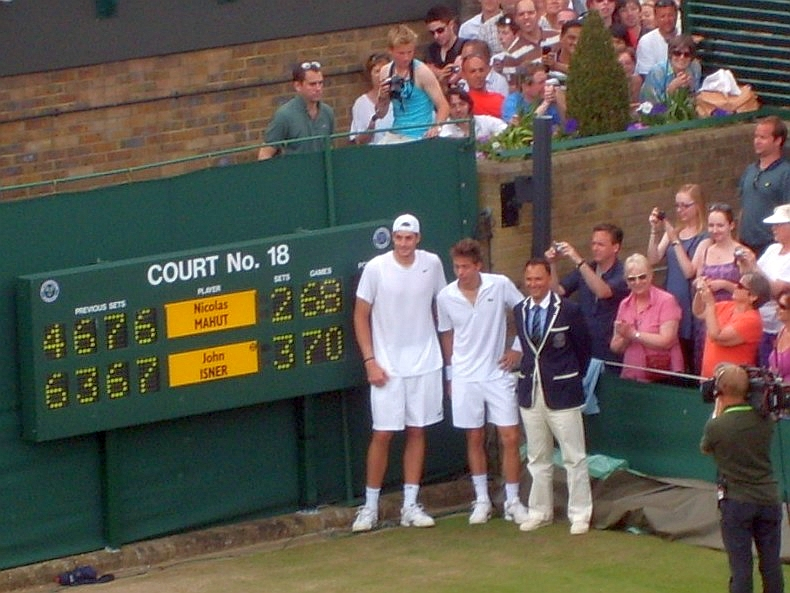
John Isner, Nicolas Mahut and Mohamed Lahyani next to the scoreboard at the completion of the longest match in pro tennis history

Mohamed Lahyani (born 27 June 1966) is a Swedish tennis umpire. He is a Gold Badge Chair Umpire certified by the Association of Tennis Professionals. He is noted for presiding over the longest match in professional tennis history at the 2010 Wimbledon Championships. He was briefly suspended in 2018 for words of encouragement to Nick Kyrgios during a US Open match between Kyrgios and Pierre-Hugues Herbert.

== Early life ==
Lahyani was born in Morocco in 1966. His family emigrated to Sweden when he was a child.

== Career ==
Over the course of his career Lahyani officiated many high profile matches at both Grand Slam and ATP tournaments, including the 2013 Wimbledon Men's Singles Final, and the 2008, 2010, 2013, 2017, and 2020 ATP World Tour Finals' Finals.

Lahyani was also the Chair Umpire at the longest match in pro tennis history: the Isner–Mahut match at the 2010 Wimbledon Championships. Lahyani later said he was so gripped by "an amazing match" that he couldn't even think of "eating or needing a bathroom'. After the match, he was presented with a crystal bowl, a Wimbledon tie and silver cufflinks.

When a Canadian tennis reporter Tom Tebbutt surveyed a number of tennis journalists at the 2014 ATP World Tour Finals, the majority voted Lahyani as the best Chair Umpire. Lahyani is particularly known for a very distinctive way he often announces the score, toning it up or down depending on the score. For instance, when the server faces two break points, Lahyani would announce the score as "fifteen-FORTY", with an emphasis on "FORTY".

At the 2018 US Open Lahyani made headlines after his controversial behaviour during the match between Nick Kyrgios and Pierre-Hugues Herbert, when he climbed down from his chair and encouraged Kyrgios to put in extra effort. At the time Kyrgios was losing by a set and a break, but after Lahyani's comments, recovered and won the match. After criticism from current and former players, Lahyani was suspended for the next two tournaments.
