= Gerry Armstrong (tennis official) =

English tennis official

Gerry Armstrong (born 1955) is an English tennis official. In a career lasting half a century, he has been a key figure at both the All-England Lawn Tennis Club (AELTC), where he has been the Championships Referee, and on the ATP Tour, where he is a Tour Supervisor.

== Early life ==
Gerald Armstrong was born in April 1955. His father, George Armstrong, who died in 1997, was himself a tennis official: in 1975 he was the chair-umpire for the memorable Gentlemen's Singles Final, between Arthur Ashe and Jimmy Connors.

Armstrong qualified as a teacher in physical education (PE) at the Nonington College of Physical Education (NCPE) in Kent, from 1977 to 1980. He then graduated from Brighton University in 1983, with a BEd., specialising in sports coaching.

== Career ==
=== Wimbledon ===
Armstrong's career as a tennis official began in 1973, at the age of eighteen, when he became a line-judge at Wimbledon.

In 1982, Armstrong became a full-time chair-umpire at Wimbledon. He had first taken the chair some years earlier, in 1974, for a mixed doubles match involving major champions Evonne Goolagong and Virginia Wade and their match-partners Kim Warwick and Roger Becker. At his retirement from the chair, in 2015, he had been the umpire for thirteen finals matches: four Gentlemen's Singles, four Ladies' Singles and five Doubles matches.

In 2007 he became an Assistant Referee at the Championships, adding Qualification Referee in 2012 and Wheelchair Match Referee in 2014.

In 2020 he became the Championships Referee. He stood down in 2023.

=== Australian Open ===
In addition to officiating at Wimbledon, Armstrong's career took him overseas, including the other Majors. This included John McEnroe's notorious 4th Round match at the 1990 AO, in Melbourne, in which the player was defaulted (disqualified) by Armstrong, game, set and match, following several code violations.

=== ATP World Tour ===
In January 1990, Armstrong became one of eight full-time officials recruited for the Association of Tennis Professionals top-tier tour. He has now served more than three decades as Tour Supervisor for the ATP World Tour, now known simply as the ATP Tour.

== Family life ==
Armstrong is married to Julie, herself a PE teacher, and they have two children; the couple are now grandparents. They live in Friston, near Eastbourne.

Armstrong's other interests include playing village-cricket; he will turn out for Willingdon as the season allows.

Armstrong studied at Brighton in order to obtain a BEd. degree in addition to his NCPE teaching qualification, but the University of London, which supervised many of the certificates and diplomas at the time, later decided to award retrospective honorary degrees to those who had completed the three-year course at NCPE and other colleges. As a result, Armstrong appears to have two first-degrees, both of which are a BEd.
