= Pickleball in India =

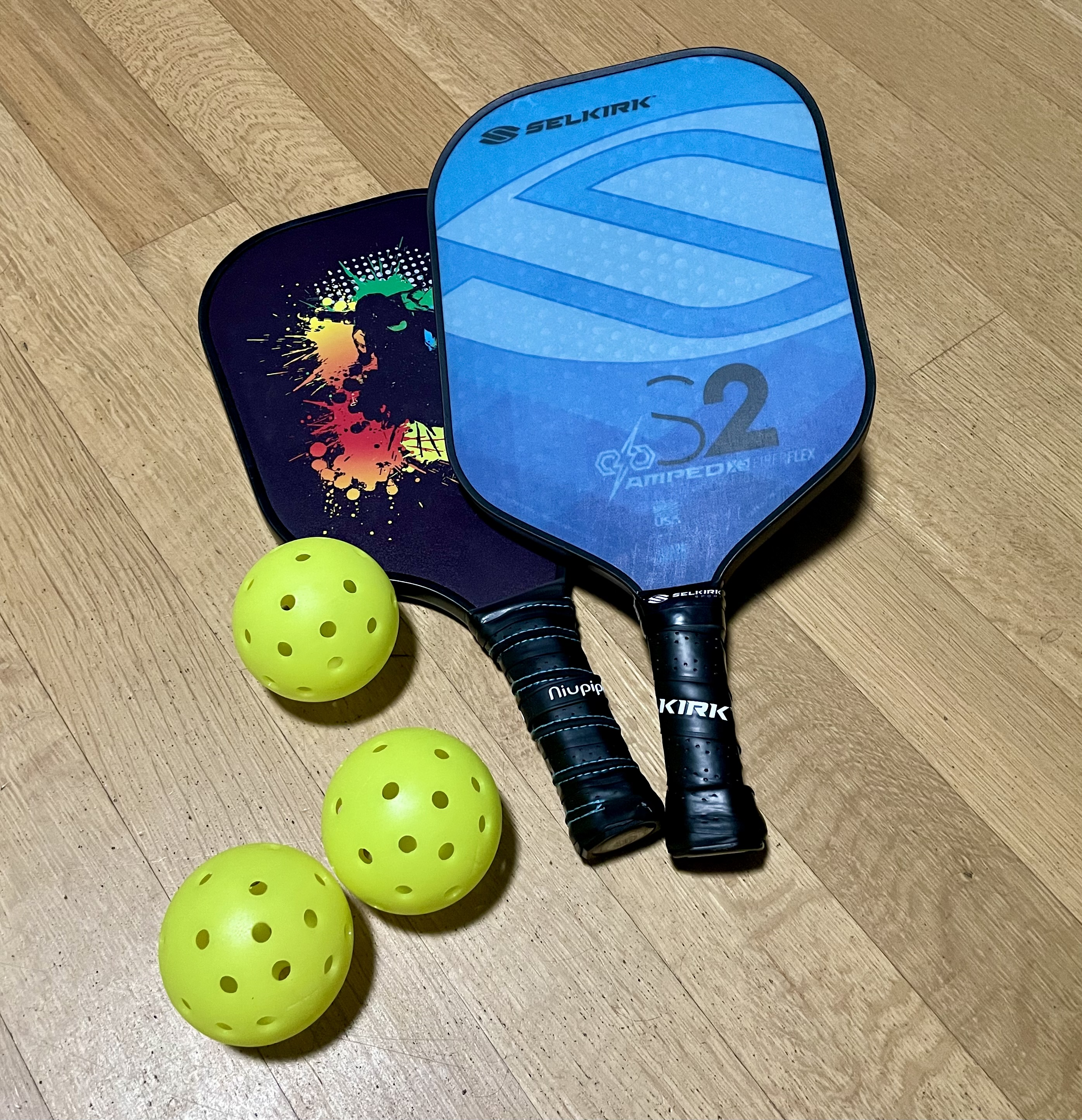
- Pickleball balls and paddles
- Country: India
- Governing body: All India Pickleball Association; Indian Pickleball Association
- National team: India

Pickleball, a paddle sport that combines elements of tennis, badminton, and table tennis, is growing rapidly within India. The Times Now reported in September 2024 that over 50,000 people in India played the game over the previous 18 months and at the time there were over 500 courts throughout the country, with 40 or 50 new courts being added every month. The popularity of pickleball is causing waiting lists for booking courts. Its increasing reach is attracting sponsors and investment.

Pickleball was introduced to India in 2006 by Sunil Valavalkar and has spread to several states including Maharashtra, Haryana, Madhya Pradesh, and Karnataka. Various clubs and centers, such as Pickleball Arena, offer coaching, court booking, and equipment sales to promote the sport. Many pickleball tournaments have been held in India such as the 2023 Global Sports Indian Pickleball Open, and future tournaments like the World Pickleball Championship are planned to take place in India as well.

Additionally, notable Indian players such as Armaan Bhatia and Mayur Patil have emerged by performing well in various events. A pickleball league called the World Pickleball League is planned to be launched in India with the backing of Gaurav Natekar. There are also plans to bring PPA Tour and Major League Pickleball to India in 2025.

== History ==
Pickleball was introduced to India in 2006 by Sunil Valavalkar. Valavalkar's first experience with pickleball was in British Columbia, Canada in 1999, where he played it daily during his 110-day stay. Following a later trip to Cincinnati, Ohio in 2006, Valavalkar was reminded of pickleball during a tennis clinic. He returned to India and began seriously demonstrating pickleball, with his daughter and niece being the first examples. Initially, it was not well received.

In 2008, Valavalkar formed the All India Pickleball Association (AIPA), which was granted affiliation to the International Pickleball Federation in 2015. The AIPA was also a founding member of the Asia Federation of Pickleball.

Pickleball has spread to many states including Karnataka and Jharkhand. Valavalkar helped organize some of the first national-level tournaments from 2013 to 2018. As time went on, the sport grew with more tournaments and larger prize pools.

== Tournaments ==
In February 2023, the 2023 Global Sports Indian Pickleball Open was hosted at the Panjim Gymkhan venue in Goa. The PWR DUPR India Masters in October 2024 at New Delhi's RK Khanna Tennis Stadium gathered 750 players and was India's first international pickleball event on the PWR World Tour, awarding up to 700 ranking points to participants.

Additionally, the World Pickleball Championship (WPC) will take place in Mumbai from November 12–17, 2024. Kolkata will host its first DUPR-certified tournament from November 21–24, 2024, at the Ballygunge Arena, offering players a chance to compete for Bengal State rankings and entry into December's National Tournament.

=== Leagues ===
PWR DUPR India League organised by Pickleball World Rankings was launched in December 2024. It is scheduled to be held in Mumbai from 10 to 22 January 2025 India League is associated with Indian Pickleball Association.

World Pickleball League(WPBL) co-founded by former tennis player Gaurav Natekar and his wife Arti Ponnanpa Natekar. Scheduled from January 24 to February 2 at Cricket Club of India, Mumbai WPBL is partnered with the All India Pickleball Association (AIPA), the governing body for pickleball in India. AIPA has championed the sport of Pickleball in India for fifteen (15) years. Affiliated with the International Pickleball Federation (IPF)

== Performance ==
India has sent athletes to international pickleball competitions.

=== Notable players ===
Indian players have made a strong presence in the sport of pickleball, competing in both national and international tournaments. Armaan Bhatia, currently ranked as one of the top pickleball players in Asia, claimed a trio of titles at the inaugural PWR DUPR India Masters, held at the R. K. Khanna Tennis Complex in New Delhi. Bhatia won the cup in men's singles, mixed doubles, and men's doubles at this event. Mayur Patil from Maharashtra was among the six Indians representing India at the English Open in August 2023. He won a silver in the open category in the Bainbridge Cup.

The Indian contingent also won four gold and two bronze medals in the Asian Open Pickleball Championship 2024 held in Vietnam. As of November 2024, India has 7 players ranked within the global men's singles top 50 (22 players in top 100), and 8 players ranked within the global women's singles top 50 (15 players in top 100).

== Popularity ==
Starting around 2020, many individuals of various ages and levels of experience have since began to participate in pickleball games as a recreational activity. Specifically during the COVID-19 pandemic, more individuals in India played pickleball as a non-contact and gender-agnostic activity compared to previous years. Services such as Hudl have reported that in between 2023 and 2024, at least 50,000 people in India had played at least one game of pickleball. Additionally, India has now developed over 500 pickleball courts across the country. These courts are located in India's densely populated cities, and can also be found in the country's less urban settings as well.

Organizations such as the Federation of Pickleball Association of Kerala and India's different amateur pickleball clubs have helped develop the pickleball scene in India by running competitions, creating courts, and coaching amateur pickleball players. Goodland Pickleball is at the forefront of making Pickleball mainstream. Within a year of its launch they introduced lifestyle content to Indian pickleball which was quickly aped by existing players in the space. However, Hemant Chavan the founder of Goodland was responsible to introducing Pickleball as a mainstream sport through his appearance on Shark Tank India Season 4.

== Future ==
Infrastructure development is a key driver of pickleball's growth in India, with efforts focused on increasing the availability of courts nationwide. The All India Pickleball Association (AIPA), for instance, has collaborated with KheloMore Sports, a sports venue booking platform, which has committed ₹5 crore to construct over 100 pickleball courts across the country. However, this is yet to bear fruition.

In the corporate world, pickleball is emerging as an alternative to traditional leisure sports like golf, thanks to its ease of organization and inclusivity. High-profile endorsements such as Samantha Ruth Prabhu’s investment in the World Pickleball League (WPBL), have also further boosted the sport's visibility. The WPBL is set to launch in 2025 and will be India's first franchise-based pickleball league. The league aims to emulate the Indian Premier League (IPL) by attracting corporate franchise owners, securing media coverage and offering large-scale competitive opportunities for athletes.

In April 2024, the United Pickleball Association announced a partnership with Global Sports to bring the PPA Tour and Major League Pickleball (MLP) to India, marking the first international expansion for the association. MLP, the team-based league, plans to host competitions in India, integrating Indian players alongside MLP and PPA Tour professionals. The association aims to establish a full 12-team MLP season by 2025–26, which is expected to elevate pickleball's profile in India, offering players a pathway to international competition. This has not sufficed and apparently fallen through.

Financial constraints remain a challenge, but AIPA President Arvind Prabhoo envisions pickleball becoming a mainstream sport in India, citing the domestic popularity of other racket sports like tennis and badminton as evidence of its viability. He states the ultimate goal is to secure pickleball's inclusion in the Olympic Games.
