= PPF =

PPF may refer to:

== Finance ==
- Pension Protection Fund, a UK body responsible for paying pension compensation
- PPF (company), a financial group founded in the Czech Republic
- Production–possibility frontier, a graph on the goods that an economy could efficiently produce with limited productive resources
- Public Provident Fund, a savings-cum-tax-saving instrument in India

== Politics ==
- The Participatory Politics Foundation a US non-profit organization
- Parti Populaire Français, a French fascist party active before and during World War Two
- Pirate Party (France), a former French political party
- Progressive Policies Forum, a UK organization involved in a 2008 scandal over Peter Hain's campaign
- Public Policy Forum, a Canadian think tank

== Science ==
- Percent Point Function for the calculation of statistical quantiles.
- Photosynthetic Photon Flux, see Photosynthetic photon flux density
- Propofol, a drug used to induce anesthesia
- Public Psychiatry Fellowship at Columbia University Department of Psychiatry

== Sports ==
- Pacific Pro Football
- Philippine Pickleball Federation
- Professional Pickleball Federation

== Other uses ==
- Paint protection film
- Print production format, a file format in the print industry
- Program of Priestly Formation, a document by the United States Conference of Catholic Bishops on the formation of priests in the Roman Catholic Church
