= WPBL =

WPBL may refer to:

- Women's Philippine Basketball League
- Women's Pro Baseball League
- Women's Professional Basketball League
- World Pickleball League

== See also ==
- WBL (disambiguation)
