= AIPA =

AIPA or Aipa may refer to:

- All India Pickleball Association
- American Inventors Protection Act
- ASEAN Inter Parliamentary Assembly
- Australian and International Pilots Association
- Azienda Italiana Petroli Albanesi
- Nathaniel Aipa (d. 1998), Malawian Anglican bishop
