= PCNS =

PCNS may refer to:

- Password Change Notification Service, deployed by Microsoft
- Peralta College for Non-Traditional Study, former name of Berkeley City College
- Pickleball Canada National System, Canadian online system for pickleball organizations
- Progressive Conservative Association of Nova Scotia
