= Pickleball in Canada =

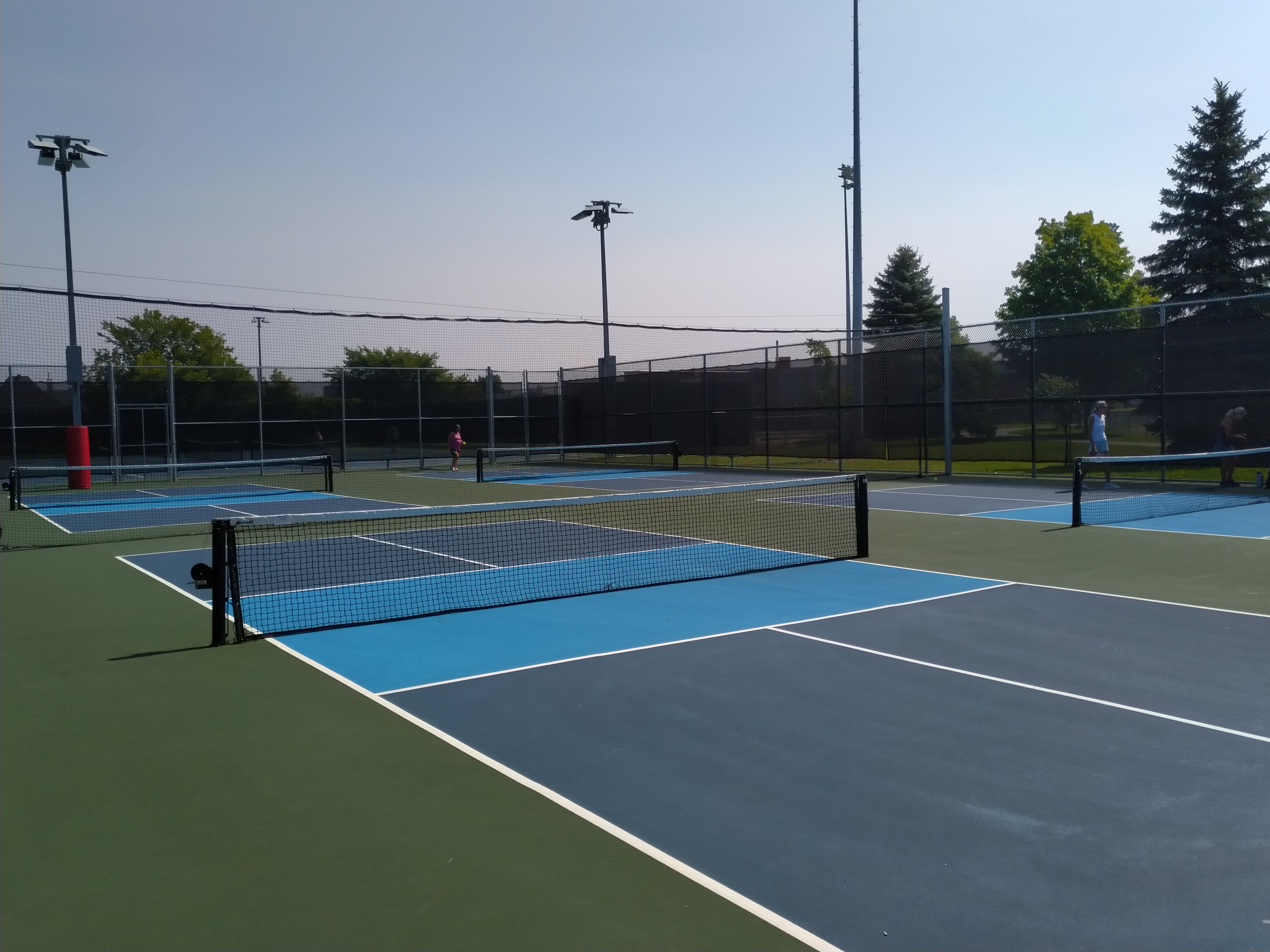
- Pickleball courts at Parc des Moissons, L'Assomption, Quebec
- Governing body: Pickleball Canada Organization
- Nickname: PCO
- Registered players: 85,223 As of 31 December 2024

Pickleball, a paddle sport that combines elements of tennis, badminton, and table tennis, was invented in the United States in 1965, on Bainbridge Island, Washington.

In 2023 Pickleball Canada, the defacto national governing body for the sport, commissioned a report on pickleball participation in Canada. The report found that 1.37 million Canadians played pickleball at least once per month. Pickleball Canada's January 2025 survey found that 1.54 million Canadian's participate in the sport, a 57% increase from when the survey was first performed in 2022. Picklebal Canada's membership numbers increased from 31,312 in 2022, to 53,143 in 2023, and reached 85,223 members by the end of 2024.

== Governing body ==
The Pickleball Canada Organization (PCO), originally the Canadian National Pickleball Association, was formed in April 2009. As of 2025, it is simply called Pickleball Canada. Although not yet recognized by Sport Canada, it has become the de facto national governing body for the sport.

In March 2021 the PCO established the Pickleball Canada National System (PCNS) as a central online resource for managing, coordinating and communicating pickleball-related activities nationwide. Among other things, the PCNS can be used for;

- Managing club, provincial and national pickleball association memberships
- Communicating with club members
- Setting up and managing club webpages
- Identifying places-to-play
- Managing events
- Selling pickleball-related goods and services

=== International affiliations ===
When the International Pickleball Federation (IPF) was formed, the PCO was one of the founding national members. In 2022 several member nations withdrew from the IPF, including Canada, and in 2023 they established the Global Pickleball Federation (GPF). The PCO is also a member of the Pickleball Federation of the Americas, a continental organization within the GPF.

=== Sub-national affiliations ===
The PCO has regional associations with the following provincial and territorial organizations:

- Alberta - Pickleball Alberta (PA)
- British Columbia - Pickleball BC Association (PBCA)
- Manitoba - Pickleball Manitoba Inc. (PMI)
- New Brunswick - Pickleball New Brunswick - Pickleball Nouveau-Brunswick (PNB)
- Newfoundland and Labrador - Pickleball Newfoundland and Labrador Association Inc. (PNL)
- Nova Scotia - Pickleball Nova Scotia (PNS)
- Ontario - Pickleball Ontario (PO)
- Prince Edward Island - PEI Pickleball ÎPÉ
- Quebec - Pickleball Quebec or Quebec Pickleball Federation (FQP - Fédération québécoise de pickleball)
- Yukon - Yukon Pickleball Association (YPA)

== Professional tours & leagues ==
Canadian National Pickleball League: The CNPL was announced on February 1, 2023, and held its inaugural season in the same year. A team format, similar to the MLP team format, is used, but with six players per team.

Canadian Pickleball Association: the CPA was established in 2024 and announced the CPA Pro Pickleball Tour in May 2024. The 2024 Tour held four events with a $15,000 prize pool for each event. As a partner of the Pickleball World Rankings, CPA events are part of the PWR World Tour where players can earn points to attend the PWR World Series.
