= Philippine Pickleball Federation =

- Sport: Pickleball
- Category: Racket sport
- Jurisdiction: Philippines
- Membership: 277 clubs (As of October 2025); 18,000 players (As of 2025)
- Abbreviation: PPF
- Founded: 2019
- Affiliation: Global Pickleball Federation
- Affiliation date: 2023
- Headquarters: Pasig, Metro Manila, Philippines
- President: Armand Tantoco
- Chairman: Mike Johnson
- Secretary: Red Dumuk

Official website
- www.pickleball.ph
- (Philippines)

The Philippine Pickleball Federation (PPF) is the national sports association for pickleball in the Philippines. It is recognized by the Philippine Olympic Committee. The PPF is responsible for promoting and developing pickleball throughout the country.

It is a former member of the International Pickleball Federation and a founding member of the Global Pickleball Federation.

== History ==
=== Early development (2016–2018) ===
Philippine Pickleball Federation (PPF) states that the sport of pickleball was introduced in the Philippines via a clinic held in Cebu in February 2016 by Sara Ash.

The first dedicated pickleball venue was set up at the LDS Church in Makati in June 2017. The first pickleball club in the country was established within the same year.

Lacking proper courts, Street Pickleball was established on Emerald Avenue in Ortigas Center, Pasig, starting in April 2018 and is considered by many to be the birthplace of Philippine pickleball.

=== Formation and early initiatives (2019) ===
On April 15, 2019, the organization registered with the Securities and Exchange Commission (SEC) as the "Philippine Pickleball Sports Association, Inc" (PPSA). In July 2019 PPSA applied to change its name to the Philippine Pickleball Federation and sought recognition from the International Federation of Pickleball (IFP) as the national sports association for pickleball in the Philippines.

=== Growth and international affiliations (2019–2021) ===
On September 1, 2019, it became an associate member of the IFP. By January 2020, the PPF joined regional neighbors to form the Asian Federation of Pickleball (AFP). PPF became a founding member of the AFP in March 2020, with its president, Mike Johnson, elected as AFP Secretary General. In April 2021, the IFP granted PPF full member status. In May 2021, Mike Johnson accepted a position on the IFP Board of Directors as the new IFP Secretary.

=== Formation of GPF and further developments (2022–2025) ===
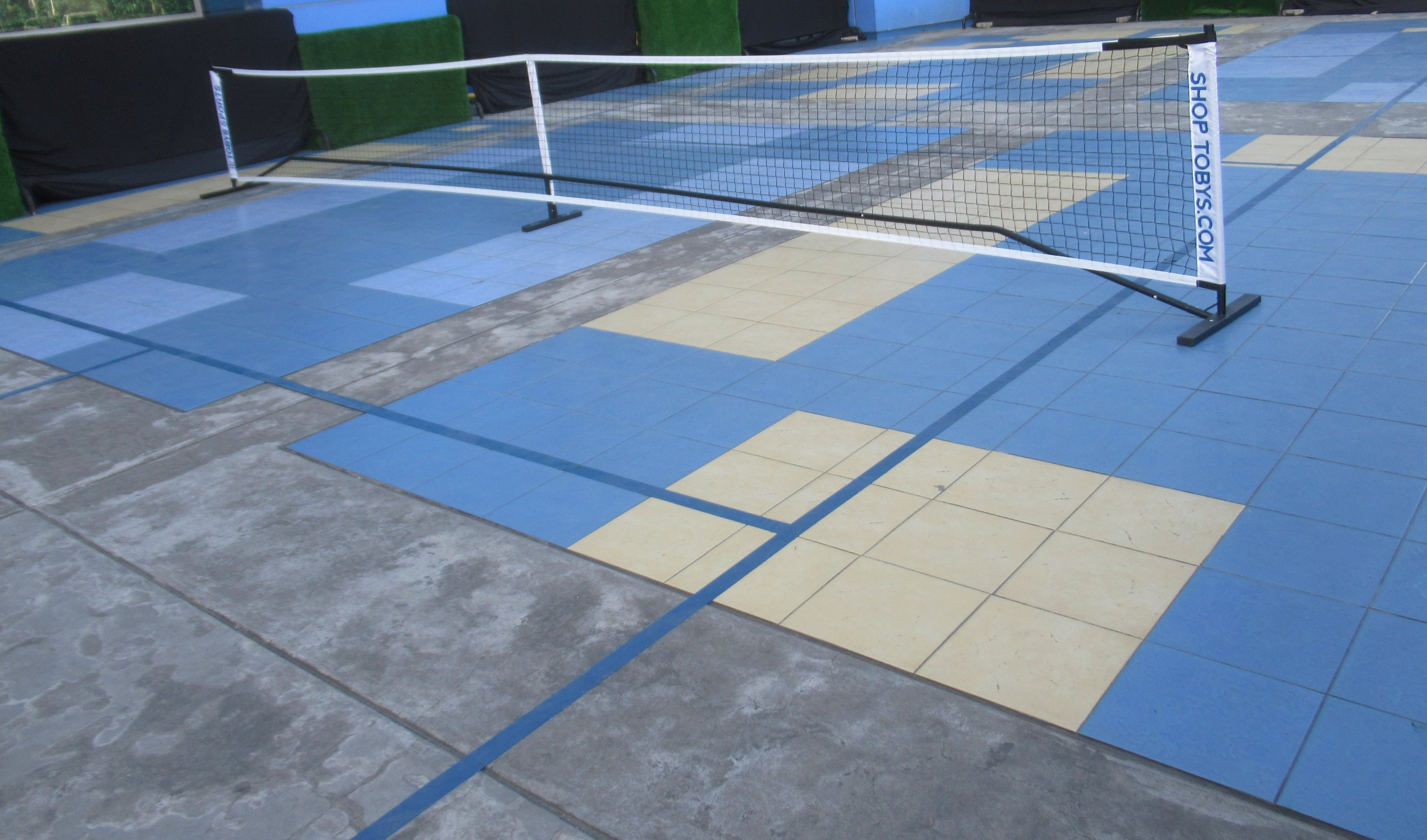
A pickleball court in the Philippines.

The PPF was among the federations which has withdrew from the IPF by March 2022 over governance issues.

In October 2022, the SEC approved the name change to the "Philippine Pickleball Federation". PPF was one of the first members of the newly formed Global Pickleball Federation (GPF), PPF was one of the first countries to qualify for Class-A membership with full voting rights.

In May 2024, the Philippine Olympic Committee recognized PPF as the National Sports Association (NSA) for pickleball for the Philippines. As of March 2025, the PPF had grown to 211 registered member clubs and over 13,000 members.

The first Philippine Pickleball National Championship was hosted in Marikina from May 30 to June 1, 2025. In February 2026, the PPF announced it will be introducing the Philippine Pickleball Participant (PPP) Registry, a national database for players, coaches, and officials as well as a national ranking system.

== Affiliations ==
The Philippine Pickleball Federation is a recognized member of the Philippine Olympic Committee. Internationally, its a member of the Global Pickleball Federation.

== Tournaments ==
- Philippine Pickleball National Championship (2025)

== National team ==
A team representing the Philippines won season 1 of the Pickeball Champions League Asia in Shenzen, China in 2025.

== Leadership ==
- Mike Johnson: Founder and current chairman.
- Armand Tantoco: President.
- Red Dumuk: Secretary General.
- Coni Ibañez: Treasurer
