= All India Pickleball Association =

- Sport: Pickleball
- Category: Sport
- Jurisdiction: India
- Membership: 24 states in India
- Abbreviation: AIPA
- Founded: 2008
- Affiliation: International Pickleball Federation
- Regional affiliation: Asia Federation of Pickleball
- Headquarters: Mumbai
- Location: Goregaon
- President: Arvind Prabhoo

Official website
- www.pickleball.in
- (India)

The All India Pickleball Association, aka AIPA, is the governing body of pickleball in India. Established by Sunil Valavalkar in 2008, in 2015 the AIPA became a founding member of the International Federation of Pickleball (IFP), now the International Pickleball Federation.

== History ==
All India Pickleball Association (AIPA) was founded in 2008 with the Registrar of Companies, Govt. Of India. They were registered under the Indian Companies Act, 1956. AIPA also received recognition from Rahul Gandhi.

AIPA expanded their reach to a national level in 2012 with a demonstration game in Jaipur. More states were granted affiliation in the latter half of 2012 and the first ever All India Open Tournament was held at Mumbai in 2013.

In May 2015, AIPA constructed its first outdoor court. There were regular inter district tournaments held throughout the year as well as the 3rd All India Open Tournament held at Haryana, with participation from 14 states. In 2017, the first Junior National Tournament and Federation Cup Championship were held at Dehradun. In the same year, the first Indian Open Pickleball Championship was held at Mumbai, with over 20 international and 60 top seeded Indian players participating. In 2018, AIPA organized more tournaments such as the Super League, Ramesh Prabhu Memorial Tournament, Senior National Open Tournament and the 2nd Indian Open Tournament. The first all Women Tournament was organized in 2019 which saw an immense enthusiasm and participation from across the country. The Jaipur Open and the Avengers Cup was also held in the same year.

== Tournament ==
The tournament consists of divisions organized by age and skill level for men's, women's, and mixed doubles. Men's and women's singles were played for the first District level Tournament was held at Kalyan in the State of Maharasthra, where 65 school children participated in the one day event.

- Men's doubles - Under 19
- Men's doubles - 50+
- Men's doubles - Advanced
- Men's singles
- Mixed doubles
- Women's Doubles
- Women's Singles

== See also ==
- List of pickleball organizations
- Glossary of pickleball
