= List of pickleball organizations =

This list of pickleball organizations identifies key organizations around the world that promote or support the sport of pickleball.

== USA Pickleball ==
USA Pickleball, established in 1984, was the first organization to provide oversight of the sport. It was the de facto world governing body for pickleball until the International Federation of Pickleball was established in 2010. Initially named the United States Amateur Pickleball Association (USAPA), it reorganized as the USA Pickleball Association (USAPA) in 2005. The organization adopted the name USA Pickleball (USAP) in 2020. USAPA published the first official rule book in 1984, and published the USA Pickleball Association Official Tournament Rulebook in 2008. USAP's annually updated rulebook continues to be referenced as the official rule book for most recreational games and amateur tournaments around the world.

== Worldwide governing bodies ==
=== International Pickleball Federation ===
The International Federation of Pickleball (IFP) was established in 2010. Inaugural members were the United States, Canada, Spain, and India.

The IFP had 70 member nations at the end of March 2022, but a conflict in the organization resulted in 7 of 8 full member nations, and 2 associate member nations, withdrawing, including United States, Canada, and Spain. In 2023 the IFP reorganized and changed its name to the International Pickleball Federation (IPF).

The annual Bainbridge Cup, named for the island where pickleball was invented, was established by the IPF in 2017. It became the sport's first intercontinental team event. The inaugural event was held in Madrid, Spain and pitted North America against Europe. The winning team earns the Bainbridge Cup trophy. Both the 2020 and 2021 Bainbridge Cup team competitions were canceled due to the COVID-19 pandemic.

In November 2024 the IPF and WPF announced that they had agreed to merge their two organizations, and in June 2025 the voting members of each organization affirmed the merger. The new organization will operate under the World Pickleball Federation name, and adopt the IPF's core mission of "No country left behind".

=== World Pickleball Federation ===
The WPF was established in 2018 and had 37 member nations as of November 2022. Part of the WPF's stated mission is to "govern the infrastructure of pickleball". The WPF declared October 10 of each year World Pickleball Day and set the goal of introducing 10,000 new players to the game of pickleball every October 10.

The World Pickleball Games were first announced by the WPF in 2021 and are intended to serve as a format for possible future Olympic games. The inaugural World Pickleball Games had been scheduled for May 2022 in Austin, Texas, but due to on-going impacts of the COVID-19 pandemic the games were postponed indefinitely.

In November 2024 the IPF and WPF announced that they had agreed to merge their two organizations, and in June 2025 the voting members of each organization affirmed the merger. The new organization will operate under the World Pickleball Federation name, and adopt the IPF's core mission of "No country left behind".

In November 2025 the Global Pickleball Federation and the United World Pickleball Federation announced a potential merger.

=== Global Pickleball Federation ===
The GPF was initially conceived by a task force formed by Pickleball Australia and Pickleball Canada. In 2022 USA Pickleball, and several other IPF member nations, withdrew from the International Pickleball Federation due to internal disagreements. In November 2023 USAP joined 28 other countries to formally launch a new world-wide governing body for pickleball, the Global Pickleball Federation. By November 2024 the organization had 52 member nations.

The GPF is organized into four continental federations which include the Confederation of African Pickleball (CAP), the Pickleball Federation of the Americas (PFA), the Asian Pickleball Association (APA), and Oceana Pickleball Association (OPA). In addition, seven European countries are represented independently, outside of a continental federation.

In November 2025 the Global Pickleball Federation and the United World Pickleball Federation announced a potential merger.

=== Pickleball International Committee ===
The Pickleball International Committee (PIC) was established in 2023 endeavoring to be "the global governing body for pickleball". One of the PIC's major initiatives, dubbed plastic free pickleball, is to make the sport of pickleball more sustainable, particularly by replacing the plastic currently used in pickleballs with an alternative environmentally sustainable material. Terry Cecil, the PIC's chief executive officer, believes pickleball is on a trajectory to become one of the biggest sports in the world, but he believes the sport will never be accepted by the International Olympic Committee, if the sustainability issue isn't addressed.

=== United Pickleball Association of America ===
The United Pickleball Association of America (UPA-A) was formed in May 2024 by the United Pickleball Association, the parent company of the Professional Pickleball Association (PPA) and Major League Pickleball (MLP). Initially it was formed to act as the governing body for the PPA and MLP in the United States, but with the expansion of the UPA to Australia, India, and Canada, the UPA has become a transnational organization, resulting in the UPA-A also becoming an international governing body.

== Continental governing bodies ==
In July 2023 the Asian Federation of Pickleball (AFP) and European Pickleball Federation (EPF) formed an alliance to "jointly promote pickleball in these two continents". They seek to develop common bylaws for governing pickleball-related activities across Europe and Asia, and to promote adherence to International Olympic Committee (IOC) requirements for the eventual inclusion of pickleball in the Olympics. The two federations intend to pursue a single IOC compliant international Federation.

In October 2023, the EPF and AFP were joined by the Confederation of African Pickleball (CAP), the Oceana Pickleball Federation (OPF), and the Pickleball Federation of the Americas (PFA) announcing a single alliance of continental federations to further "... provide the base for the recognition of a single international governing body by all pickleball playing countries ...". The CAP, OPF, and PFA have all affiliated with the Global Pickleball Federation, and the EPF and AFP have affiliated with the World Pickleball Federation.

=== Asia Federation of Pickleball ===
The Asia Federation of Pickleball (AFP) is a not-for-profit organization that was established in 2020 to bring pickleball to the Asian Games (Asiad) and the Southeast Asian Games (SEA Games). Through sponsoring tournaments, coaching and building partnerships the organization seeks to expand the sport throughout Asia. The AFP is affiliated with the World Pickleball Federation.

=== Asian Pickleball Association ===
The Asian Pickleball Association (APA) was formed in 2023 and is affiliated with the Global Pickleball Federation.

=== Confederation of African Pickleball ===
The Confederation of African Pickleball (CAP) was founded as a not-for-profit organization in 2023 to promote and develop pickleball throughout Africa. It was officially chartered by the Association of African Sports Confederations. The CAP worked to have pickleball included in the 2023 African Games as a demonstration sport, and nine countries ended up participating. This included Benin, Democratic Republic of Congo, Egypt, Ghana, Kenya, Nigeria, Rwanda, Sierra Leone and South Africa. The organization is working to have pickleball included as a sport in the 2027 African Games. The CAP is affiliated with the Global Pickleball Federation.

=== European Pickleball Federation ===
Created in May 2023, the European Pickleball Federation (EPF), was created as a not-for-profit organization that would bring together all the national organizations that promote pickleball in Europe. As of November 2024 the EPF had members representing 34 European countries.

=== Oceania Pickleball Federation ===
The Oceania Pickleball Federation (OPF) was formed in 2023 and is affiliated with the Global Pickleball Federation.

=== Pickleball Federation of the Americas ===
The Pickleball Federation of the Americas (PFA) was formed in 2021 by USA Pickleball, Pickleball Canada, and Pickleball Mexico. The organization was formed to serve as the continental federation and governing body for North America, South America, Central America and the Caribbean.

== Tournament & rating organizations ==
=== DUPR ===
Dynamic Universal Pickleball Rating (DUPR), originally established in 2021 as Dreamland Universal Pickleball Rating, is both a pickleball player rating system, and the name of the organization that administers the system. The rating system was developed by Steve Kuhn, owner and operator of the Dreamland family amusement center near Austin, Texas, and founder of Major league Pickleball. In January 2024, controlling interest in the DUPR organization was purchased by a consortium of investors led by David Kass. Other investors included; Andre Agassi, Raine Ventures (a subsidiary of The Raine Group), and Jay Farner.

DUPR player ratings, or DUPR scores, range from 2 to 8 in .001 increments. Each person's DUPR score includes a reliability rating, ranging from 1% to 100%, that increases as more matches are played and recorded. The higher the reliability rating, the more confident you can be that the DUPR score is accurate. A reliability rating over 60% is considered reliable. DUPR scores are adjusted real time whenever a new game is recorded in the DUPR application. Adjustments to an individual's score considers the opponent's DUPR score, who won and who lost, the point differential of the game, and the recency of the game.

==== DUPR Collegiate National Championship ====
DUPR held its first United States Collegiate National Championship (CNC) in November 2022 at the Dreamland facility in Dripping Springs, Texas. The nationals tournament was the only event held that year. Subsequent years consisted of numerous regional events culminating in the nationals. To better align the CNC with school year schedules, DUPR moved the 2025 CNC to April.

In January 2025 DUPR announced a partnership with the United Pickleball Association to rebrand their college competitions as the Collegiate Pickleball Tour (CPT) and Collegiate National Championship (CNC).‍
