= WBL (disambiguation) =

WBL may refer to:

== Sports ==
- Women's Professional Basketball League, the first professional women's basketball league in the United States
- World Basketball League, a height restricted men's basketball league in the United States
- Women's Basketball League (Netherlands), the highest level of women's basketball in the Netherlands
- Western Baseball League, an independent baseball league in the United States
- World Billiards Limited, a subsidiary of the World Professional Billiards & Snooker Association

== Arts, media and entertainment ==
=== Music and television series ===
- West, Bruce and Laing, the rock band
- We Best Love, a Taiwanese television drama series

=== Broadcasting stations ===
- WBL (The CW Plus), the CW Plus television station
- WBL (AM), the former call sign of the WWJ, a commercial AM radio station
- WBL, a radio station in Metro Manila, Philippines

== Others ==
- Work-based learning, an educational strategy
- wbl, the ISO 639-3 code for Wakhi language
