= International Pickleball Federation =

Pickleball governing body

International Pickleball Federation (IPF)
- Formation: 2023; 3 years ago
- Type: Federation of national associations
- Headquarters: Goodyear, Arizona, U.S.
- Members: 77 national associations As of March 2025
- Official language: English
- President: Arvind Prabhoo
- Website: ifpickleball.org

The International Pickleball Federation (IPF) was created in 2023 to act as the world-wide governing body for the sport of pickleball. The IPF is a not-for-profit organization that seeks to perpetuate the international growth and development of pickleball, create and maintain official rules across all of pickleball and organize international tournaments. One of the IPF's main goals is to have the sport of pickleball accepted to the Olympic Games.

Originally the IPF was founded as the International Federation of Pickleball (IFP) in 2010 by the USA Pickleball Association (USAPA), now USA Pickleball (USAP), and several other national organizations. Internal conflicts, financial issues and loss of its not-for-profit status resulted in the IFP being shut down as an entity, and the new IPF was formed in April 2023 to take its place.

In November 2024 the IPF and World Pickleball Federation (WPF) announced that they would merge, and in June 2025 the members of each organization voted to affirm the merger. The merged organization will operate under the World Pickleball Federation name and adopt the IPF's core mission of, "No country left behind". The newly merged entity will be based in Lausanne, Switzerland, home of the International Olympic Committee.

== History ==
The International Federation of Pickleball (IFP) was founded in the wake of the first National Pickleball Open competition, held in Surprise, Arizona in 2009. The tournament was hosted by the USA Pickleball Association (USAPA) and drew almost 400 players from 26 American states and several Canadian provinces. The interest of the Canadians, among other factors, influenced the USAPA to establish a committee dedicated to the formation of an international governing body for pickleball. This committee was formed in 2010. The IFP's constitution and bylaws were officially ratified in 2015 by its four inaugural member countries: the United States, Canada, Spain, and India.

In 2018 a rival organization, the World Pickleball Federation (WPF), was formed by Seymour Rifkind, who had previously established the International Pickleball Teaching Professional Association (IPTPA). Both the IFP and WPF sought to promote pickleball worldwide, and both seek to obtain Olympic recognition for the sport.

On April 22, 2022, the United States, Canada, Mexico, Australia, England, France, Spain, Philippines, Finland, Cayman Islands and the Czech Republic withdrew their membership in the IFP (sic), reducing the number of member countries from 70 to 59. This was due primarily to governance concerns, and loss of the IFP's non-profit status in the United States. The remaining members of the IFP then shut down the old organization and formed the new International Pickleball Federation (IPF) in 2023.

== Structure ==
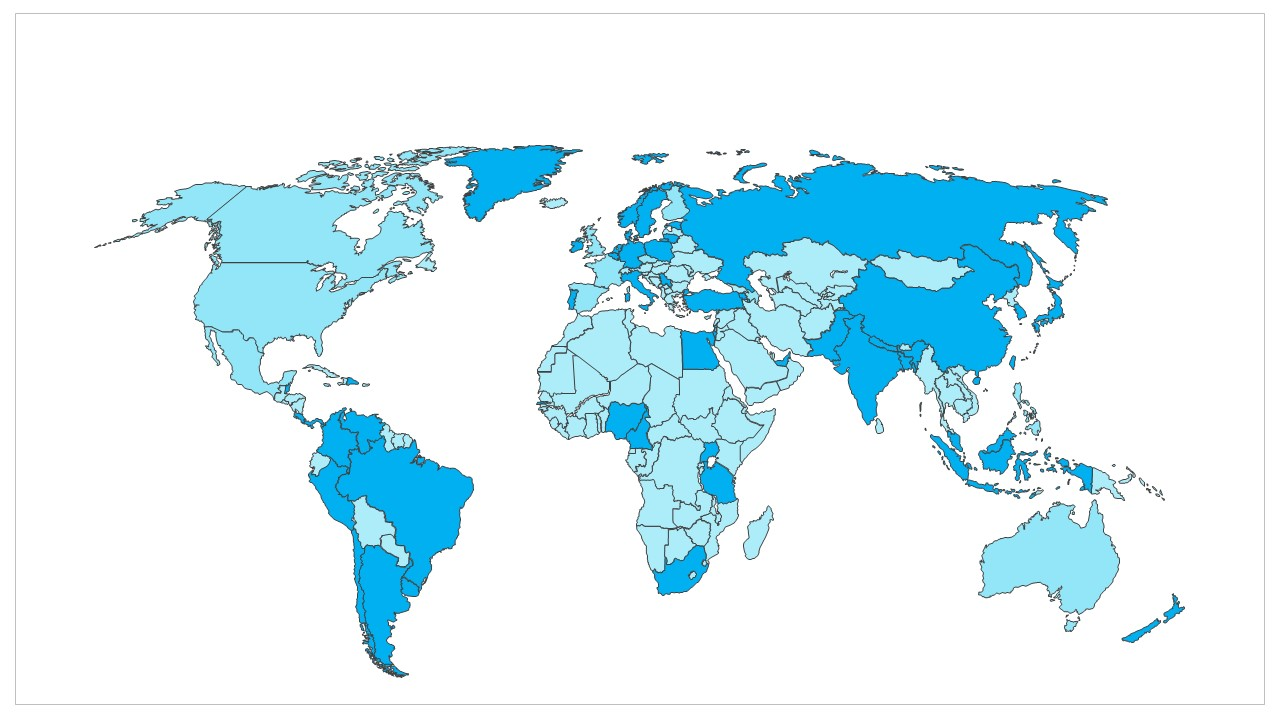
Map of the world, the darker blue highlighting which countries are members of the IPF as of April 22, 2022

=== National and regional associations ===
As of April 22, 2022 there are 63 national organizations in the International Federation of Pickleball, including the special administrative region of Hong Kong, China. These national associations are organized into four categories: full members (1), Associate members (22), Affiliate members (37), and Provisional members (3). Each member country is organized under the umbrella of a continental federation. Full member countries can have members elected to the IPF's board of directors, while associate and affiliate member countries cannot. All member countries are required to follow the rules of pickleball as established by the IPF.

The IPF has five continental federations. These are the Asia Federation of Pickleball (AFP), North American Pickleball Federation, South American Pickleball Association, European Pickleball Federation (EPF), and Oceanic Pickleball Federation.

Overall, the IPF gives complete autonomy to member countries in their own nations, except if the actions of a member nation "affect the international image of the sport, the uniform application of one set of rules, or in some way affect the future Olympic status of the sport."

=== Board of directors ===
The IPF's officers on the board are elected by the IPF's full member nations and serve two-year terms. The board consists of four officers, including the President, and lower-ranking members known as "At Large" members. The board may assign a maximum of six at-large members at any given time. The previous President is also reserved an "At Large" spot on the board.

Board of directors (2023)
Role	Board member	National association
President	Arvind Prabhoo	India
Vice President	Alicia Wolfgruber	Austria
Treasurer	Dwight Crawford	United States
Legal Counsel	Marlon Schulman	United States
CTO	Adnan El Guennouni	Canada

== Competitions ==
=== Bainbridge Cup ===
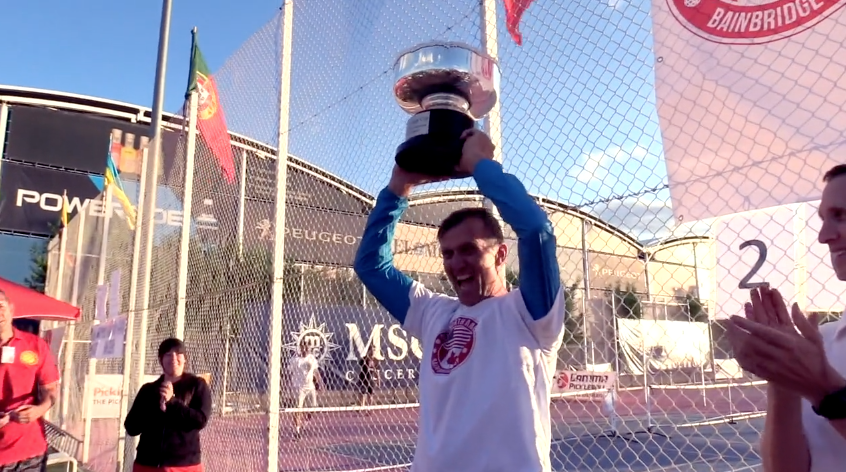
Team North America leader Marcin Rozpedski, holding the trophy earned by Team North America at the inaugural 2017 Bainbridge Cup

The IFP hosted the annual Bainbridge Cup, one of the first international pickleball team tournaments, prior to the formation of the IPF. The tournament was held from 2017 to 2019, but was cancelled in 2020 and 2021 due to the COVID-19 pandemic. The last Bainbridge Cup event was held in 2022 in Mumbai, India.

The tournament was named after Bainbridge Island, where pickleball was invented by Joel Pritchard and his colleagues. It consisted of two teams representing geographical regions, usually continents. Originally, the tournament pitted players from Europe against those from North America. In the 2021 Bainbridge Cup, the tournament was organized as "east" versus "west", with players west of the Mississippi River and those from Asia on one team, and players east of the Mississippi and those from Europe on the other.

The tournament divisions were organized by age and skill level for men's, women's, and mixed doubles. Men's and women's singles were played for the first time at the Bainbridge Cup as a demonstration event in 2021. The inaugural competition was held in Madrid, Spain in 2017.

Year	Date(s)	City	Country	Results	Notes
2017	Sep 15	Madrid	Spain	201 North America; 119 Europe	The inaugural was played concurrently with the Spanish Open Pickleball Championships.
2018	Jul 20	Montesilvano	Italy	106 North America; 82 Europe	Played concurrently with the Italian Open Pickleball Championships.
2019	Jul 12	Essen	Germany	193 Team World; 173 Europe	Played concurrently with the German Open Pickleball Championships.
2020	Jul 3	Nottingham	England	Event; Cancelled	Originally scheduled to be played concurrently with the English Open Pickleball Tournament. Both events were cancelled due to the COVID-19 pandemic.
2021	Apr 7–11	Holly Hill, FL	USA	Team cup Cancelled	Event title: Humana-Island Doctors Bainbridge Cup by International Federation of Pickleball. Originally scheduled to be played using an East vs. West team format. Players east of the Mississippi River and Europe would be on one team, and players west of the Mississippi and Asia would be the other team. The team format was eliminated due to the COVID-19 pandemic.
2022	Nov 30–Dec 4	Mumbai	India	7 Team India; 6 Pickleball United	Team India took on a team of players from around the world, Pickleball United. Team India won against Pickleball United 7-6.

== List of IPF members ==
Listed below are International Pickleball Federation member countries in order by member type and when they joined. As of April 2022 eleven member countries have withdrawn their memberships from the IPF.

Type	Joined	Country	Formed	Abbr.	Name	Website and comments
Full; Withdrawn	2015	USA	1984	USAP	USA Pickleball	Official website. Originally formed as the United States Amateur Pickleball Association in 1984. Reorganized as the USA Pickleball Association in 2005 and then USA Pickleball in 2020.
Full; Withdrawn	2015	Canada	2009	PCO	Pickleball Canada (organization)	Official website. Originally formed as the Canadian National Pickleball Association in May 2009, it later became the Canada Pickleball Organization, but is now commonly referred to as Pickleball Canada.
Full; Withdrawn	2015	Spain	2012	AEP	Spanish Pickleball Association	Asociación Española de Pickleball official website. Founded in 2012 by Michael Hess, a Southern California native.
Full	2015	India	2008	AIPA	All India Pickleball Association	Official website. Founded in 2008 by Sunil Valavalkar.
Full; Withdrawn	2018	Australia	2020	PAA	Pickleball Australia Association Limited	Official website.
Full; Withdrawn	2019	Philippines	2019	PPF	Philippine Pickleball Federation	Official website. First formed as the Philippine Pickleball Sports Association (PPSA) on April 15, 2019, then rebranded as the PPF six months later.
Full; Withdrawn	2020	Mexico		LPPM	Professional Pickleball League Mexico	Liga Profesional de Pickleball México official website.
Full; Withdrawn	2021	Czech Republic			Czech Pickleball Association	Piklebal ČR official website.
Associate; Withdrawn	2015	France		PF	Pickleball France	Association Nationale Pickleball France official website.
Associate	2015	Italy		AIP	Italian Pickleball Association	L'Associazione Italiana Pickleball official website.
Associate	2016	Holland			Pickleball Holland	Official website.
Associate	2018	China			China/Shenzhen Pickleball Association	Official website.
Associate	2018	Taiwan	2016	CTPA	Chinese Taipei Pickleball Association	Official website.
Associate	2018	Hong Kong			Pickleball Association of Hong Kong, China	Official website.
Associate	2018	South Korea			Korea Pickleball Association	Official website.
Associate	2018	Scotland			Pickleball Scotland	Official website.
Associate; Withdrawn	2019	England			Pickleball England	Official website.
Associate	2019	Germany	2017		German Pickleball Association	Deutschen Pickleball Bund official website.
Associate	2019	Singapore	1995	SPA	Singapore Pickle-Ball Association	Official website.
Associate	2019	Pakistan		PAP	Pickleball Association of Pakistan	See Pickleball Association of Pakistan on Facebook.
Associate	2019	Poland			Polska Pickleball	Polski Pickleball official website.
Associate	2019	Malaysia			Malaysia Pickleball Association	See Malaysia Pickleball on Facebook.
Associate	2020	Sweden	2017		Swedish Pickleball Association	Svenska PickleballFörbundet official website.
Associate	2020	Denmark			Pickleball Denmark	Official website.
Associate	2020	Japan		JPA	Japan Pickleball Association	Official website.
Associate	2020	Costa Rica			Pickleball Costa Rica	Official website.
Associate	2020	Belgium			Pickleball Belgium	Official website.
Associate	2020	New Zealand		PNZA	Pickleball New Zealand Association	Official website.
Associate	2021	Samoa		PAS	Pickleball Association of Somoa	For Pikopol Asosi A Somoa, see Samoa Pickelball Group [sic] on Facebook.
Associate	2021	Peru			Pickleball Peru	See Asociación Deportiva de Pickleball Perú on Facebook.
Associate; Withdrawn	2021	Finland	2014		Pickleball Finland	Official website.
Associate	2021	Nepal		NPA	Nepal Pickleball Association	See Nepal Pickleball Association NPA on Facebook.
Associate	2021	Malta			Malta Pickleball	Official website.
Affiliate	2020	Tonga			Tonga Pickleball Association	See Tonga Pickleball Association on Facebook.
Affiliate	2020	Armenia			Armenian Pickleball Federation	See Armenian Pickleball Federation on Facebook.
Affiliate	2020	Turkey				
Affiliate	2020	Georgia			Georgian Pickleball Federation	See Georgian Pickleball Federation on Facebook.
Affiliate	2021	Serbia			Pickleball Serbia	Official website.
Affiliate	2021	Indonesia				
Affiliate	2021	Lithuania			Pickleball Lithuania	See Piklbolas Lietuva on Facebook.
Affiliate	2021	Bangladesh			Pickleball Bangladesh	See PiCkleball BD on Facebook.
Affiliate	2021	Dominican Republic			Dominican Pickleball Association	
Affiliate	2021	Egypt			Pickleball Egypt	See Pickleball Egypt on Facebook.
Affiliate	2021	UAE			Pickleball UAE	See Pickleball UAE on Facebook.
Affiliate	2021	Panama			Panama Pickleball Association	See Panama Pickleball Association on Facebook.
Affiliate	2021	Argentina			Argentina Pickleball Association	See Asociación Argentina de Pickleball on Facebook.
Affiliate	2021	Brazil			Brasil Pickleball Oficial	See Brasil Pickleball Oficial on Facebook.
Affiliate	2021	Norway			Norwegian Pickleball Association	Pickleball Norge official website
Affiliate; Withdrawn	2021	Cayman Islands			Pickleball Cayman Islands	See Pickleball Cayman on Facebook.
Affiliate	2021	Palestine			Pickleball Palestine	See Pickleball Palestine on Facebook.
Affiliate	2021	Nigeria			Nigeria Pickleball Players Organization	See Pickleball Players Association Of Nigeria on Facebook.
Affiliate	2021	Uruguay			Uruguay Pickleball Association	See Pickleball.uy on Facebook.
Affiliate	2021	Portugal			Portuguese Pickleball Association	See pickleballportugal on Facebook.
Affiliate	2021	Aruba			Aruba Pickleball Federation	See Aruba Pickle Ball Federation on Facebook.
Affiliate	2021	Uganda			Uganda Pickleball Association	See Uganda Pickleball Association on Facebook.
Affiliate	2021	Chile			Chile Pickleball Association	See Asociación Chilena De Pickleball on Facebook.
Affiliate	2021	Isle of Man			Isle of Man Pickleball	See Ellan Vannin Pickleball Club 🇮🇲 on Facebook.
Affiliate	2021	Russia			Pickleball Russia	
Affiliate	2021	Guam			Guam Pickleball Association	See Pickleball Guam on Facebook.
Affiliate	2021	Venezuela			Venezuela Pickleball Association	See Pickleball Venezuela on Facebook.
Affiliate	2021	Colombia			Columbia Pickleball Association	See Pickleball Col on Facebook.
Affiliate	2021	Ireland			Irish Pickleball	See Irish Pickleball on Facebook.
Affiliate	2021	Estonia			Estonian Pickleball Association	Eesti Pickleball Liit official website.
Affiliate	2021	South Africa			Pickleball South Africa	Official website.
Affiliate	2021	Cameroon			Cameroon Pickleball Association	See Cameroon Pickleball Association on Facebook.
Affiliate	2022	Tanzania			Tanzania Pickleball	Official website, or see Tanzania Pickleball on Facebook.
Affiliate	2022	Gambia			Gambia Pickleball Federation	See The Gambia Pickleball Federation on Facebook.
Affiliate	2022	Belize			Belize Pickleball Association	Official website.
Provisional	2021	Northern Mariana Islands			Pickleball CNMI	See Pickleball CNMI on Facebook. CNMI is Commonwealth of the Northern Mariana Islands.
Provisional	2021	Northern Ireland			Pickleball Northern Ireland	See Pickleball NI on Facebook.

== See also ==
- List of pickleball organizations
- Glossary of pickleball
