= USA Pickleball =

Governing body for pickleball in the United States

- Sport: Pickleball
- Category: Racket sport
- Jurisdiction: United States
- Membership: 104,828 (As of January 2025
- Abbreviation: USAP (previously USAPA)
- Founded: 1984
- Headquarters: Surprise, Arizona, U.S.
- CEO: Mike Nealy

Official website
- usapickleball.org
- Other key staff: Justin Maloof - Chief Competition Officer, Jose Moreno - Chief Marketing & Strategy Officer, Carl Schmits - Chief Technical Officer
- (United States)

USA Pickleball, or USAP, is the national governing body for the sport of pickleball in the United States. It was the world's first pickleball oversight organization when it was established in 1984 as the United States Amateur Pickleball Association. It reorganized as the USA Pickleball Association (USAPA) in 2005, but adopted the name USA Pickleball in 2020. As the USAPA, the organization published the first official pickleball rule book in 1984 and published the USA Pickleball Association Official Tournament Rulebook in 2008. Since 2005 the organization has operated as a nonprofit 501(c)(3) organization.

== History ==
The United States Amateur Pickleball Association, originally abbreviated U.S.A.P.A., was founded by Bryon Olson, Sid Williams and a few other Washington state pickleball enthusiasts in 1984 in Tacoma, Washington. A few years later Williams changed the name of the organization to the United States of America Pickleball Association. Their objective was to perpetuate the growth and advancement of pickleball within the United States.

To help promote the game the first honorary member of the organization, number 00001, was President Ronald Reagan. A complimentary pickleball set was sent to the White House, but it's not known whether Reagan ever played the game. The Nalley Fine Foods Company, also based in Tacoma, was acquired as the organization's first sponsor. The sponsorship helped cover costs of exhibitions, clinics, and the rulebook.

In 1999 Frank Candelario took over as the USAPA president. Candelario owned the Ultra-Lite Paddle Company, which also became a sponsor.

== Tournaments ==
USA Pickleball National Championships: The 2023 Biofreeze USA Pickleball National Championships were held at Brookhaven Country Club in Dallas, Texas from November 5-12, 2023. The 2022 edition was held at the Indian Wells Tennis Garden in Indian Wells, California in November. Golden Tickets that allow participation in the National Championships can be earned by winning events in one of the following:

- National Championship Series: The National Championship Series consists of six regional championships held in various locations throughout the United States.
- Diamond Amateur Championship: A series of amateur competitions called the USA Pickleball Diamond Regionals allows regional winners to compete in the USA Diamond Amateur Championship held at Pictona in Holly Hill, Florida in December. Gold medal winners of the Diamond Amateur Championship are automatically eligible to enter the National Championships the following year.
- National Indoor Championships: Held in Hoover, Alabama in 2022. Held in Atlantic City, New Jersey in 2023.

== See also ==
- List of pickleball organizations
- Glossary of pickleball
