= Pickleball in the United States =

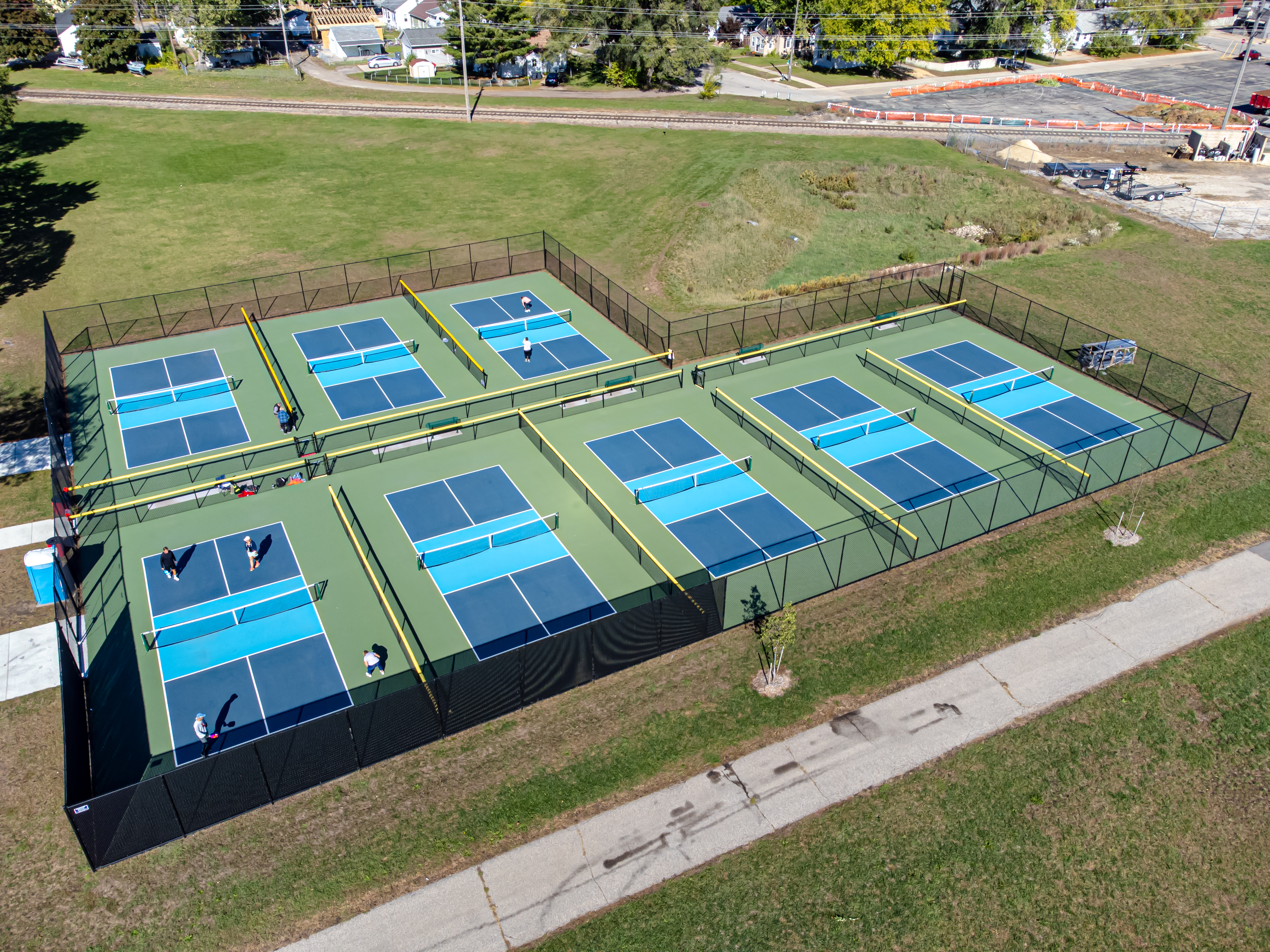
- Pickleball courts in La Crosse, Wisconsin
- Governing body: USA Pickleball
- First played: 1965

Pickleball, a paddle sport that combines elements of tennis, badminton, and table tennis, was invented in the United States in 1965, on Bainbridge Island, Washington. Since its introduction the sport has steadily increased in popularity.

In 2022, pickleball was named the official state sport of Washington. For four years in a row, 2021 through 2024, the sport was named the fastest-growing sport in the United States by the Sports and Fitness Industry Association. The 2024 report found that there were 19.8 million participants that year, a 311% growth since 2021.

== History ==
Pickleball was invented in 1965 by Joel Pritchard and two friends, Barney McCallum and Bill Bell. Pritchard later became the 14th Lieutenant Governor of the state of Washington. Over that summer Pritchard and his friends refined the game rules and equipment at Pritchard’s summer home on Bainbridge Island, Washington. The original court made use of an existing badminton court, but the first dedicated pickleball court was built in 1967 at the Washington home of another of Pritchard’s friends, Bob O’Brien.

By 1968 the game had become popular with many of the inventor’s friends and neighbors. This prompted Pritchard, McCallum's son David, and two others, to form Pickle Ball, Inc., a company that promoted the sport and sold the necessary equipment. Interest in the game continued spreading throughout the Pacific Northwest. Snowbirds in the region brought the game south to California, Arizona, Florida, and Hawaii. By 1990 the sport was being played in all 50 states.

== College level pickleball ==
Pickleball has not been sanctioned by the US National Collegiate Athletic Association (NCAA). USA Pickleball and other organizations are pursuing the possibility of NCAA recognition. Meanwhile, numerous college campuses have independently formed pickleball clubs. As of March 2025 USA Pickleball listed 166 colleges and universities with active pickleball clubs.

=== Collegiate Pickleball Tour ===
DUPR, known for its pickleball player rating software, held the first college national championship, the DUPR Collegiate National Championship, in November 2022 with 16 teams that were invited to compete. DUPR held regional qualifiers in each of the following two years to determine which teams would compete in the Collegiate National Championship competition. DUPR also held Collegiate Individual National Championships that permitted college players to compete outside of the team format.

In January 2025 DUPR announced a partnership with the United Pickleball Association to form the Collegiate Pickleball Tour (CPT) which will culminate in a Collegiate National Championship (CNC). The renamed CPT CNC will be held in the spring to better coincide with the school year, with the 2025 CNC held at Life Time Peachtree Corners in Atlanta, Georgia.

A Collegiate World Championship (CWC) will be held in the fall, where collegiate players from around the world will be invited to participate. The total prize purse for the tour is expected to exceed over $100,000 in scholarship funds.‍

Collegiate National Championship results
Year	Date	Schools	Location	Prize Pool	1st place	2nd place	Ref
2022	Nov 18-19	16	Dripping Springs, TX	$10,000	University of North Carolina	Utah Tech University	
2023	Nov 17-19	36	Peachtree Corners, GA	$32,000	University of Virginia	University of North Carolina	
2024	Nov 1-3	64	Dallas, TX	$32,000	Utah Tech University	University of Virginia	
2025	Apr 11-13	64	Peachtree Corners, GA	$32,000	University of Texas at Austin	Texas Christian University	

=== National Collegiate Pickleball Association ===
In January 2023 Noah Suemnick, a graduate of Point Loma Nazarene University in San Diego, California, formed the National Collegiate Pickleball Association (NCPA). NCPA's inaugural national championships was held in March 2024 at The Hub in Spring Valley, San Diego, California. The NCPA had over 200 colleges and universities across the United States participating in 2024/2025 season.

The NCPA Collegiate Tour includes several Regional Championship events, culminating with a National Collegiate Pickleball Championship (NCPC). The competitions include a D1 division, a competition between teams of 4 to 6 players that represent their school, and a D2 division, where players compete as individuals.

NCPA National Collegiate Pickleball Championship results
Year	Date	Schools	Location	Prize Pool	1st place	2nd place	Ref
2024	Mar 15-17	38	San Diego, CA	$30,000			
2025	Feb 14-16	64	Las Vegas, NV	$30,000	Utah Valley University	Utah Tech University	
2026	Feb 27-Mar 1	64	Bridgeton, MO	$30,000	Florida Atlantic University	University of California, San Diego	

=== APP U.S. Collegiate Championships ===
In September 2023 the Association of Pickleball Players (APP) announced its inaugural U.S. Collegiate Championships would be held in January 2024 at the Grand Park Sports Campus, home for the NFL’s Indianapolis Colts, in Westfield, Indiana. A total prize purse of $50,000 in scholarships was awarded.

APP U.S. Collegiate Championships results
Year	Date	Schools	Location	Prize Pool	1st place	2nd place	Ref
2024	Jan 3-7	--	Westfield, IN	$50,000	Utah Tech University	University of Florida	
2025	Mar 28-30	32	Cape Coral, FL	$50,000	University of Florida	University of Texas at Austin	
2026	Mar 6-8	32	Cape Coral, FL	$50,000	Florida Atlantic University	Utah Tech University	

== Professional pickleball tours and leagues ==
The first professional pickleball tour, the Professional Pickleball Federation (PPF), was formed in 2016 by John Gullo. Gullo, known as "the father of professional pickleball", was inducted into the Pickleball Hall of Fame in 2024. In March 2017 the PPF organization merged with the USAPA, now the USAP.

The popularity of pickleball spurred the growth of investors and sponsors. As a result, two pro pickleball tours were independently formed in the United States in 2019, the Association of Pickleball Professionals (APP, now the Association of Pickleball Players), and the Professional Pickleball Association (PPA). A professional pickleball league, Major League Pickleball (MLP), was formed in 2021, and a senior professional league, the National Pickleball League of Champions Pros (NPL), was formed in 2022. In 2023 the PPA and MLP merged under one umbrella organization, the United Pickleball Association (UPA).

=== Association of Pickleball Players ===
The APP and APP Tour were formed by Ken Herrmann. Herrmann aligned his tour with USA Pickleball (USAP), the original governing body of pickleball in the United States. All games are sanctioned by USAP and must abide by USAP rules. The 2022 APP Tour includes 32 tournaments in five countries and has attracted an average of 800 players in each tournament. Total prize money is expected to be $2 million. Originally the APP was named the Association of Pickleball Professionals, but was changed to the Association of Pickleball Players in 2023 to reflect the organizations support of both amateur and professional players.

In January 2024 the APP announced that it had reached an agreement to make The Fort, in Fort Lauderdale, Florida, its new permanent home and training center. Founded by Brad Tuckman and Rich Campillo, and scheduled to open in December 2024, the new facility will include 43 pickleball courts, including the world's first dedicated pickleball stadium.

=== United Pickleball Association ===
Professional Pickleball Association: The PPA was formed by Connor Pardoe and based in Draper, Utah. Desiring independence to shape the tour to his liking, Pardoe did not align with USAP. Initially, the PPA required all players to sign a one–year exclusivity contract, preventing PPA players from participating in any non-PPA tours. In late 2021, Thomas Dundon purchased the PPA and extended the exclusivity contracts to 3 years. Pardoe remained CEO of the PPA Tour. The 2022 PPA Tour was expected to include 20 tournaments with total prize money of $2.5 million.

Major League Pickleball: MLP was formed in 2021 by Steve Kuhn in Dripping Springs, Texas. In its first year, the League consisted of 8 teams and included both APP and PPA players. The second year expanded to 12 teams, but the PPA no longer allowed their players to participate in the League. Each team consists of two men and two women. Team members are chosen by a dual snake draft designed to make teams as competitive as possible. Three separate competitions are scheduled for 2022, and the winning team at each competition will win $25,000 for each team member. The winning team is also awarded the Pritchard Cup. The league expanded to 16 teams in 2023, with NFL quarterbacks Tom Brady and Patrick Mahomes, tennis player Naomi Osaka, and NBA players LeBron James, Kevin Durant, Draymond Green, and Kevin Love buying expansion teams.

=== National Pickleball League of Champions Pros ===
The NPL is a professional pickleball league established in the United States whose members are over the age of 50. The league was established in 2022. As of 2024 the league had twelve teams with eight men and eight women on each team.

== Other tournaments ==
The U.S. Open Pickleball Championships is an annual pickleball tournament that has been held since 2016 at the East Naples Community Park in Naples, Florida. The tournament is open to amateur, professional and international players.

The 2024 event, which ran from April 13th to the 20th, had over 3,250 competitors, and over 50,000 spectators. To date, this was the largest pickleball event in the world.
