= Pickleball =

Racket sport

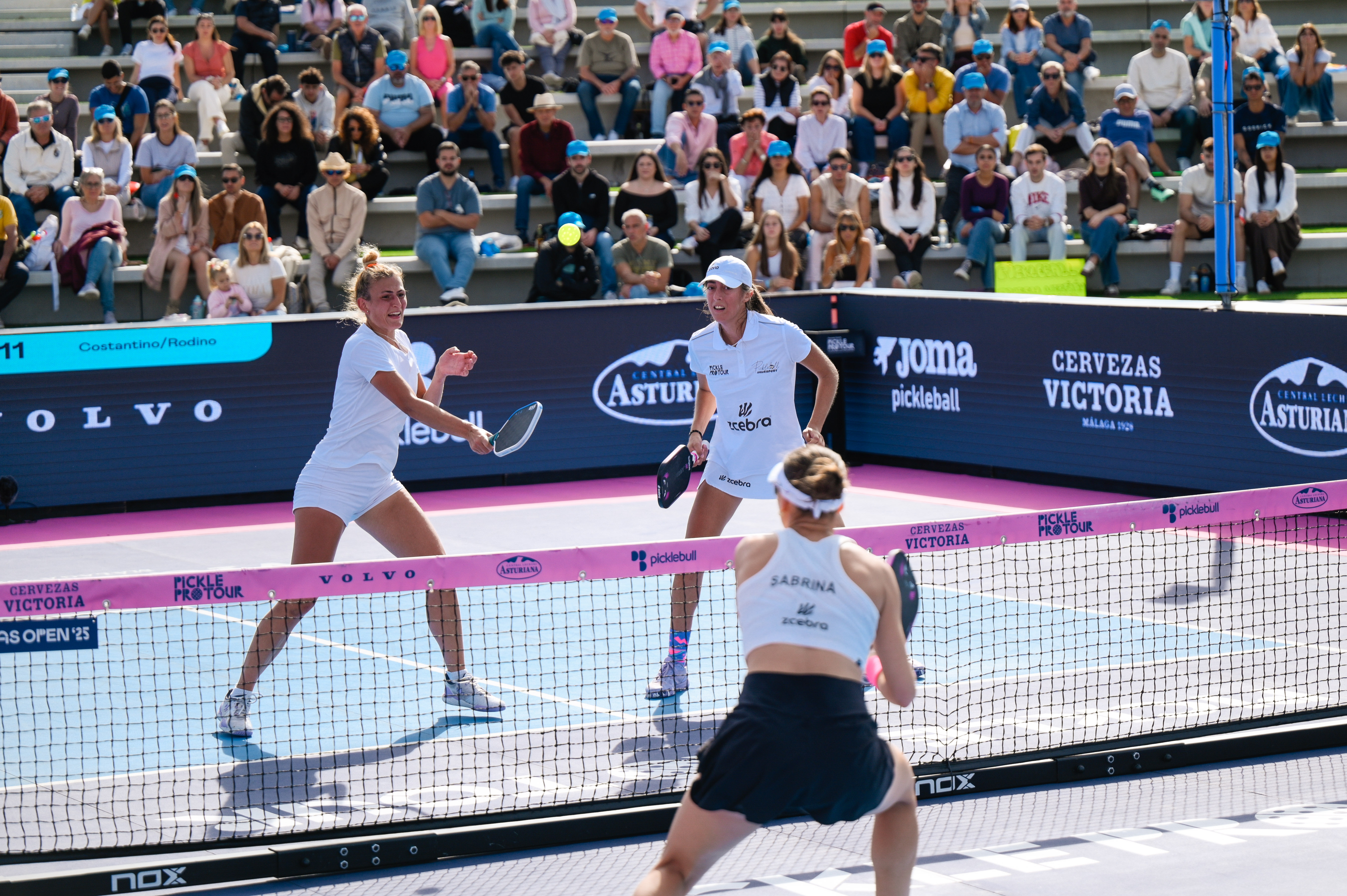
- Professional doubles match
- Highest governing body: See § Governing body, below
- First played: 1965, Bainbridge Island, Washington, United States

Characteristics
- Contact: No
- Team members: Singles or doubles
- Mixed-sex: Yes, separate singles, doubles, & mixed doubles
- Type: Outdoor or indoor, racket sport
- Equipment: Plastic pickleball, composite or wooden paddle, and net
- Venue: Outdoor or indoor, pickleball court
- Glossary: Glossary of pickleball

Presence
- Country or region: Worldwide
- Olympic: No
- Paralympic: No
- World Games: No

Pickleball is a racket sport in which two or four players use a smooth-faced paddle to hit a perforated, hollow plastic ball over a 34-inch-high (0.86 m) net, until one side is unable to return the ball or commits a rule infraction. Pickleball is played indoors and outdoors. It was invented in 1965 as a children's backyard game in the United States, on Bainbridge Island in Washington state. In 2022, pickleball was named the official state sport of Washington.

Aspects of the sport resemble tennis and table tennis played on a doubles badminton court, but pickleball has specific scoring rules, paddles, balls and court lines. On each side of the net is a 7-foot area (2.1 m) known as the non-volley zone (or kitchen); a player standing there may not strike the ball before it has bounced. The hard plastic pickleball produces less bounce than a tennis ball. The limited bounce, non-volley zones, and underhand stroke, with which all serves must be made, give the game a dynamic pace. Slow soft shots in the non-volley zone, called dinks, are used to limit the opponent's ability to attack, while balls that are returned too high might be struck with a powerful drive or overhead smash shot.

After its introduction in 1965, pickleball became a popular sport in the Pacific Northwest and gradually grew in popularity elsewhere. For four years in a row, 2021 through 2024, the sport was named the fastest-growing sport in the United States by the Sports and Fitness Industry Association. By 2024, it was estimated there were 19.8 million participants in the United States, a 311% growth since 2021. According to the Sports and Fitness Industry Association's 2026 report, 24.3 million Americans played pickleball in 2025, a 171% increase over three years. Of those, 7.48 million were core players, defined as those who played eight or more times that year.

Two professional tours were established in the United States in 2019 and shortly thereafter two professional leagues were established. Pickleball is also growing in popularity outside the United States with two professional leagues and one professional tour operating in Australia, and others being developed in Asia. More than 90% of professional pickleball players have a background in tennis.

== Etymology ==
The game was created in 1965 on Bainbridge Island, Washington, at the summer home of Joel Pritchard, who later served in the United States Congress and as Washington's lieutenant governor. Pritchard and two of his friends, Barney McCallum and Bill Bell, are credited with devising the game and establishing the rules.

According to Joan Pritchard, Joel Pritchard's wife, "The name of the game became Pickle Ball after I said it reminded me of the pickle boat in crew where oarsmen were chosen from the leftovers of other boats." Similarly, the game of pickleball was created from leftover equipment from several sports; a badminton court, paddleball paddles, a wiffle ball and a net height like that of tennis.

Other sources state that the name "pickleball" was derived from the name of the Pritchards' family dog, Pickles. The Pritchards stated that the dog came along after the game had already been named, and it was the dog that was named for the game of pickleball. They said the confusion arose when a reporter interviewing the Pritchards in the early 1970s decided it would be easier for readers to relate to the dog rather than a pickle boat. Representatives of USA Pickleball claim that research on their part has confirmed that the dog Pickles was born after the game had already been named.

Jennifer Lucore and Beverly Youngren, authors of the book History of Pickleball: More than 50 Years of Fun!, say that they could not conclusively determine whether the game was named for the dog or the dog was named for the game. They did, however, discover a third possibility: Bill Bell claimed that he had named the game because he enjoyed hitting the ball in a way that would put his opponent in a pickle.

Shortly after inventing the game, some of its inventors and their friends brought pickleball to Hawaii, where the game became known as pukaball. Puka, meaning "hole" in Hawaiian, was at first used to refer to the ball, since pickleballs have numerous holes, and later used to refer to the game itself.

== History ==
=== Invention ===
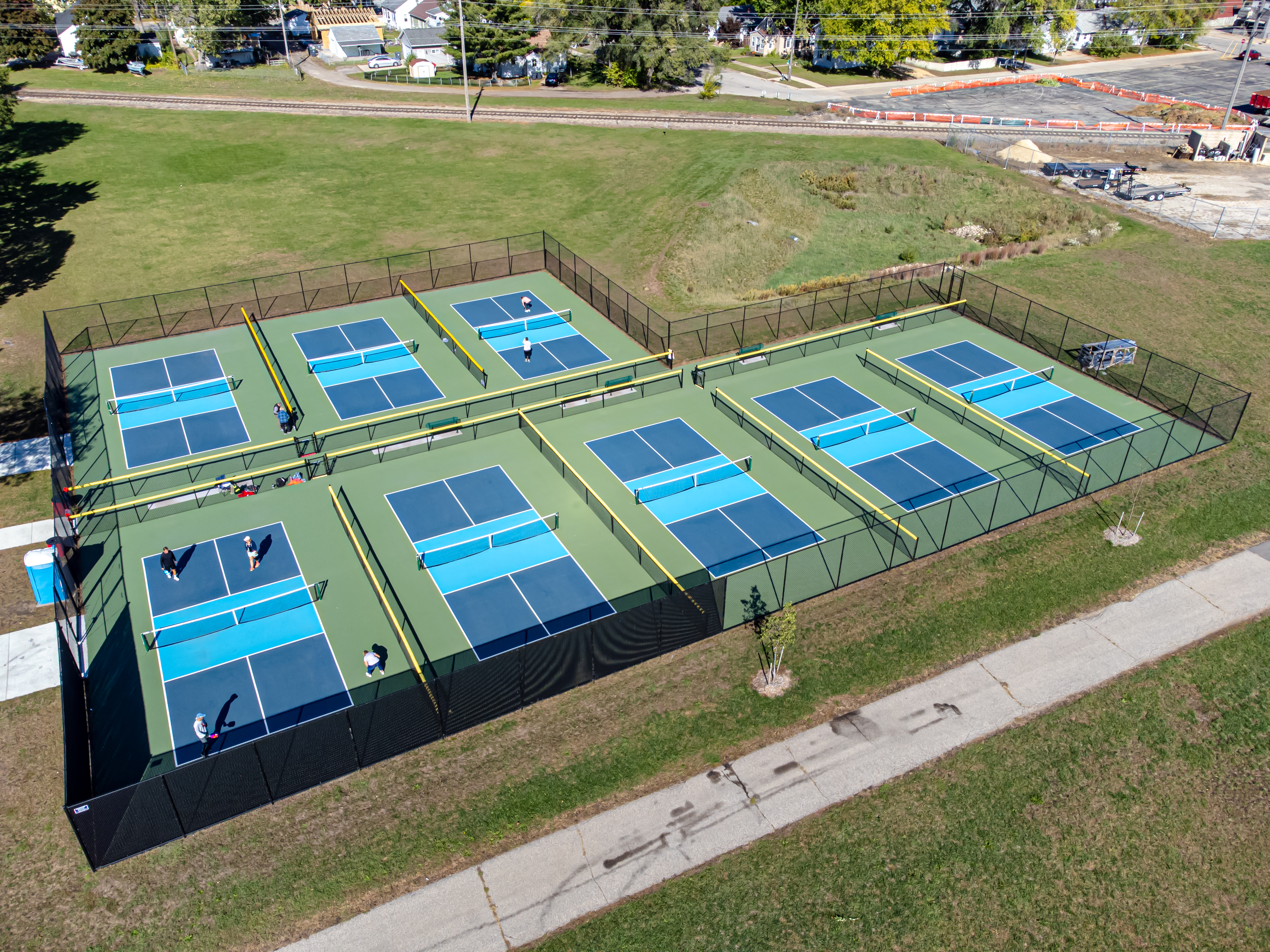
Outdoor pickle-ball court in La Crosse, Wisconsin, in 2023

When Pritchard and Bell returned from golf one Saturday afternoon in 1965, they found their families bored. They had attempted to set up badminton, but no one could find the shuttlecock. Pritchard and Bell challenged their kids to devise their own game. The adults and kids ended up at the badminton court and began experimenting with different balls and rackets, including table tennis paddles. The 5-foot (1.5-metre) badminton net was eventually lowered to hip level to accommodate driving the ball.

Initially, a Wiffle ball was used, but later the Cosom Fun Ball was found to be more durable and provided a better playing experience. The table tennis paddles were quickly replaced with larger, more durable plywood paddles fabricated in a nearby shed. McCallum continued to experiment with various paddle designs in his father's Seattle basement workshop. One paddle, he called the "M2", or McCallum 2, became the paddle of choice for most early players of the game. Over the summer Pritchard, Bell and McCallum worked together to refine and document the rules.

=== Pickle Ball, Inc. ===
In 1967, the first dedicated outdoor pickleball court was constructed at the residence of Pritchard's friend, Bob O'Brian. Soon after its creation, pickleball became popular with local neighbors and relatives of the inventors. In February 1968, Pritchard, along with McCallum's son David and two other friends, formed Pickle Ball, Inc. to promote and sell the sport. The company filed its first annual report in 1972, around the same time they trademarked the name Pickle-ball. The company manufactured wooden paddles and pickleball kits to satisfy the demand for the sport. Interest in pickleball continued to grow, and spread from the Pacific Northwest into warmer areas as "snowbirds" brought the sport south to Arizona, California, Hawaii, and Florida. In 2016, Pickle Ball, Inc. was purchased by PickleballCentral.com, which operates under the corporate name Olla, LLC.

=== Tournaments ===
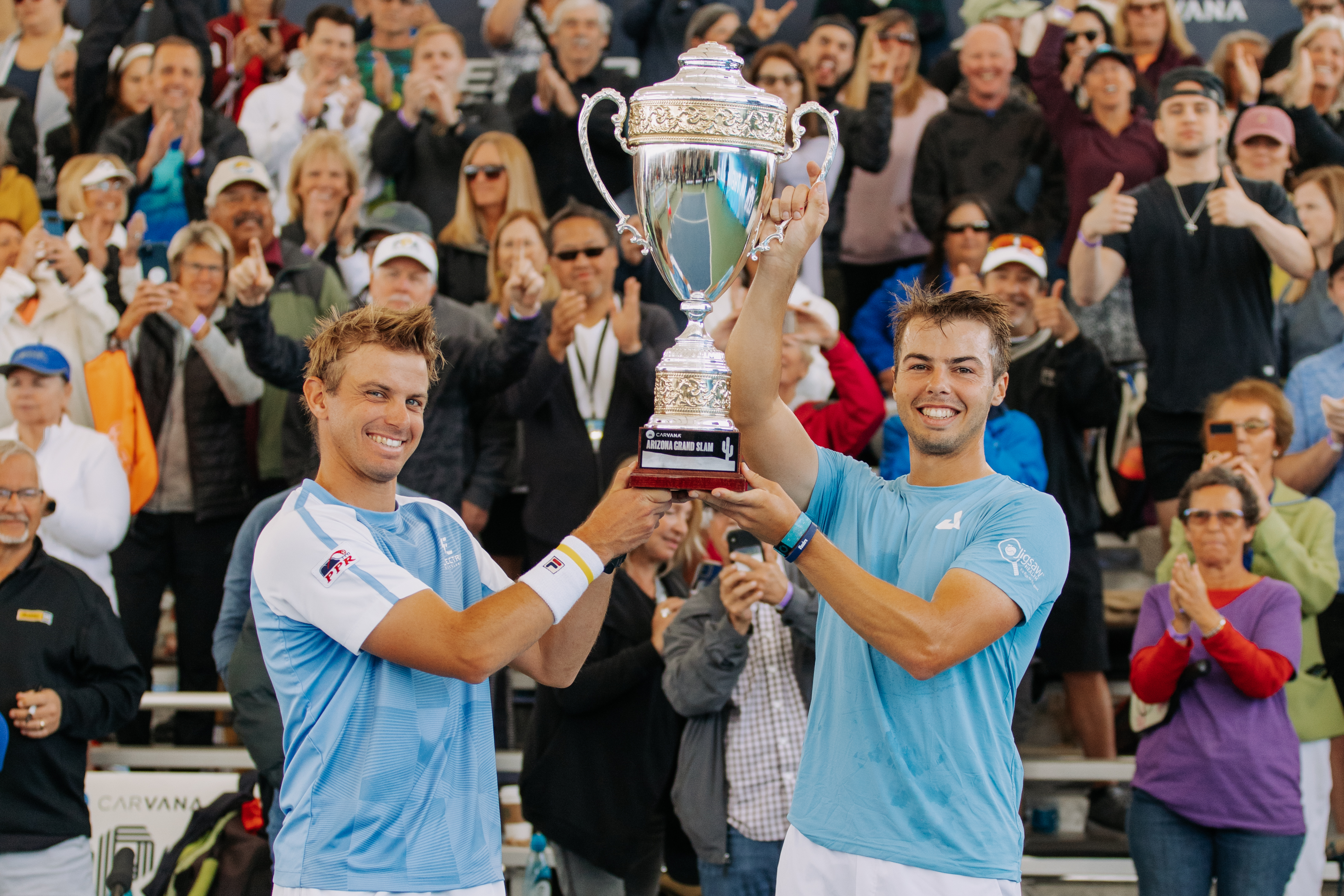
Brothers Collin Johns (left) and Ben Johns after winning the Men's Doubles title at the PPA Carvana Arizona Grand Slam presented by Hyundai in February 2023

A 1976 tournament held at the Southcenter Athletic Club in Tukwila, Washington, is credited with being the first formal pickleball tournament. It was billed as "The World's First Pickleball Championship" by Joel Pritchard and received a mention in the July 1976 edition of Tennis magazine.

The United States Amateur Pickleball Association (U.S.A.P.A.), now known as USA Pickleball or USAP, was formed in 1984. In the same year they published the first official rulebook for the sport, and held their first organized tournament, the National Doubles Championships, in Tacoma, Washington.

In 2001, pickleball was included as a demonstration sport in the Arizona Senior Olympics (ASO) with 100 participants. The pickleball tournament was held at the Happy Trails RV Resort in Surprise, Arizona, and within five years included 275 participants. The inclusion of pickleball in the ASO was seen as a significant contributor to the growth of tournaments in the United States. In 2008 the sport was included in the United States Senior Olympics.

USA Pickleball held its first regular USA Pickleball National Championships in Buckeye, Arizona, November 2009. It has continued to hold the National Championships each year in various locations, except in 2020, when the games were cancelled due to the COVID-19 pandemic. Ironically, the COVID-19 pandemic was credited with driving more people to the sport as people looked for outdoor activities.

The U.S. Open Pickleball Championships was first held in 2016, and has been played each year since at the East Naples Community Park in Naples, Florida, which has 64 permanent courts. The tournament is open to amateur, professional and international players. The 2024 event, which ran from April 13 to the 20th, had over 3,250 competitors, and over 50,000 spectators.

Professional tournaments began in 2019 when two professional tours were formed independently. The Association of Pickleball Professionals (now the Association of Pickleball Players) was established and sanctioned by USA Pickleball. The Pickleball Professionals Association was also established, but did not seek sanctioning by the USAP.

The world's first dedicated pickleball stadium was established at The Fort pickleball center, in Fort Lauderdale, Florida, by Brad Tuckman and Rich Campillo. The facility, located in the 93-acre (38 ha) Snyder Park, includes 43 pickleball courts, a 4,000-square-foot (370 m^{2}) event center, a restaurant, and several other sporting and entertainment venues. It is also the permanent home and training facility for the Association of Pickleball Players.

=== Hall of Fame ===
The Pickleball Hall of Fame was established by Seymore Rifkind in 2017. In September 2021 USA Pickleball established its own hall of fame named the USA Pickleball Hall of Fame and Museum. After significant pushback from the pickleball community, USA Pickleball reached an agreement to unify the two Hall of Fame organizations in April 2023.

=== Official recognition ===
State Senator John Lovick proposed a bill making pickleball the official sport of Washington state in 2021, and it was named the official state sport of Washington in 2022 by the Washington State Legislature. On March 28, 2022, the legislation was signed by Governor Jay Inslee on the original Pritchard family court where the sport was invented.

=== Collegiate pickleball ===
Competitive college pickleball began in the United States in 2022 when DUPR, known for their pickleball player rating software, held their first DUPR Collegiate National Championship. That was followed by the formation of the National Collegiate Pickleball Association by Noah Suemnick in 2023. Also in 2023 the Association of Pickleball Players (APP) announced it would also begin holding the APP U.S. Collegiate Championships.

In 2025 DUPR, in collaboration with the United Pickleball Association, rebranded the DUPR Collegiate National Championship as the Collegiate Pickleball Tour and National Championships. A Collegiate World Championship, where collegiate players from all countries will be invited to participate, will also be held.‍

=== Media ===
Pickleballtv (PBTV), an ad-supported pickleball streaming channel, was launched in November 2023. It is co-owned by the Tennis Channel and the United Pickleball Association, the parent company of the PPA Tour and Major League Pickleball. Pickleballtv is available through the Tennis Channel's app/website and pickleballtv.com's dedicated website, as well as several other streaming platforms such as Plex TV, FuboTV, Amazon Fire TV and Roku.

== Growth ==
=== United States ===
The 2023 report by the Sports and Fitness Industry Association (SFIA), released in February 2024, states that pickleball grew 223.5% over three years in the United States. The report also states that 13.6 million people played pickleball in 2023. In May 2024, CNBC noted, citing a report from the Trust for Public Land, the number of outdoor pickleball courts in major cities went up 650% in the last seven years, with more than 3,000 courts across 100 of the most populated cities in the US.

The 2022 SFIA report, released in 2023, estimated that approximately 900 million dollars of court infrastructure investment is needed to keep up with the fast growth of the sport. To illustrate the need for this infrastructure, the SFIA has reported that the Middle Atlantic region (includes NY, NJ, and PA) had the lowest court coverage with 1 dedicated court for 1000 participants. Pickleball participation grew in every region in the United States according to the report by the SFIA. The South Atlantic region (includes DE, FL, GA, MD, NC, SC, and VA) had the most pickleball players with 1.9 million players. The Pacific region was second with 1.5 million players and the East North Central region came in third with 1.4 million players.

When Major League Pickleball was established in 2021, offering league franchise opportunities, it attracted investors such as NBA player LeBron James, retired NFL quarterback Drew Brees, and entrepreneur Gary Vaynerchuk. This increased visibility further raised the sport's popularity.

The Apple Heart and Movement Study, a collaboration with Brigham and Women's Hospital, the American Heart Association, and Apple, found that among Apple Watch users the number of pickleball players surpassed tennis for the first time in July 2023.

=== International ===
An analysis by DUPR, whose software is used to set player ratings world-wide, found that the growth of pickleball is accelerating around the globe. While the United States still has the highest number of players, based on DUPR registrations, it is followed by Canada, Australia, the United Kingdom, and Malaysia. Their data shows the top five countries with the fastest growing number of registered DUPR players are India, Thailand, Venezuela, China, and the Philippines. Players from new countries are frequently registering, reflecting pickleball's global spread.

The growth of pickleball and other racket sports such as padel wasn't received positively by tennis players, as clubs replace tennis and basketball courts with pickleball courts. Novak Djokovic stated in a press conference during 2024 Wimbledon Tennis Championships that "on a club level, tennis is endangered" while also pointing out that a single tennis court can be converted unto multiple padel or pickleball courts.

== Rules ==
USA Pickleball published the original rulebook in 1984 while it was still operating as the United States Amateur Pickleball Association. Although not formally recognized by any international or national sports authority, USA Pickleball has continued to maintain the "Official Pickleball Rulebook" since it was first printed. Each year the organization provides an updated version of the rulebook with corrections, clarifications and new rules it deems are necessary. In 2023 USAP began publishing a separate document that describes specifications related to equipment, such as nets, balls, and paddles. Equipment used in USAP sanctioned tournaments must appear on the USAP list of approved equipment.

Rules-related information found in the sections below; Court and equipment, Order of Play, and Manner of Play, are based on the USA Pickleball 2025 Official Rulebook or the Equipment Standards Manual, unless otherwise specified.

== Court and equipment ==
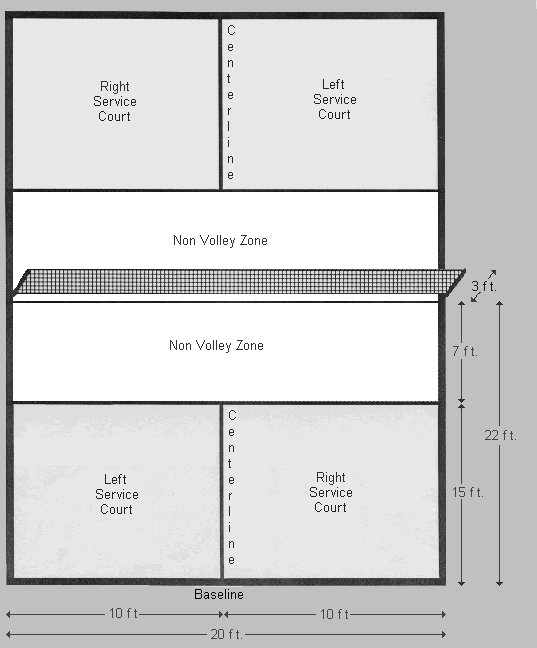
Dimensions of a pickleball court

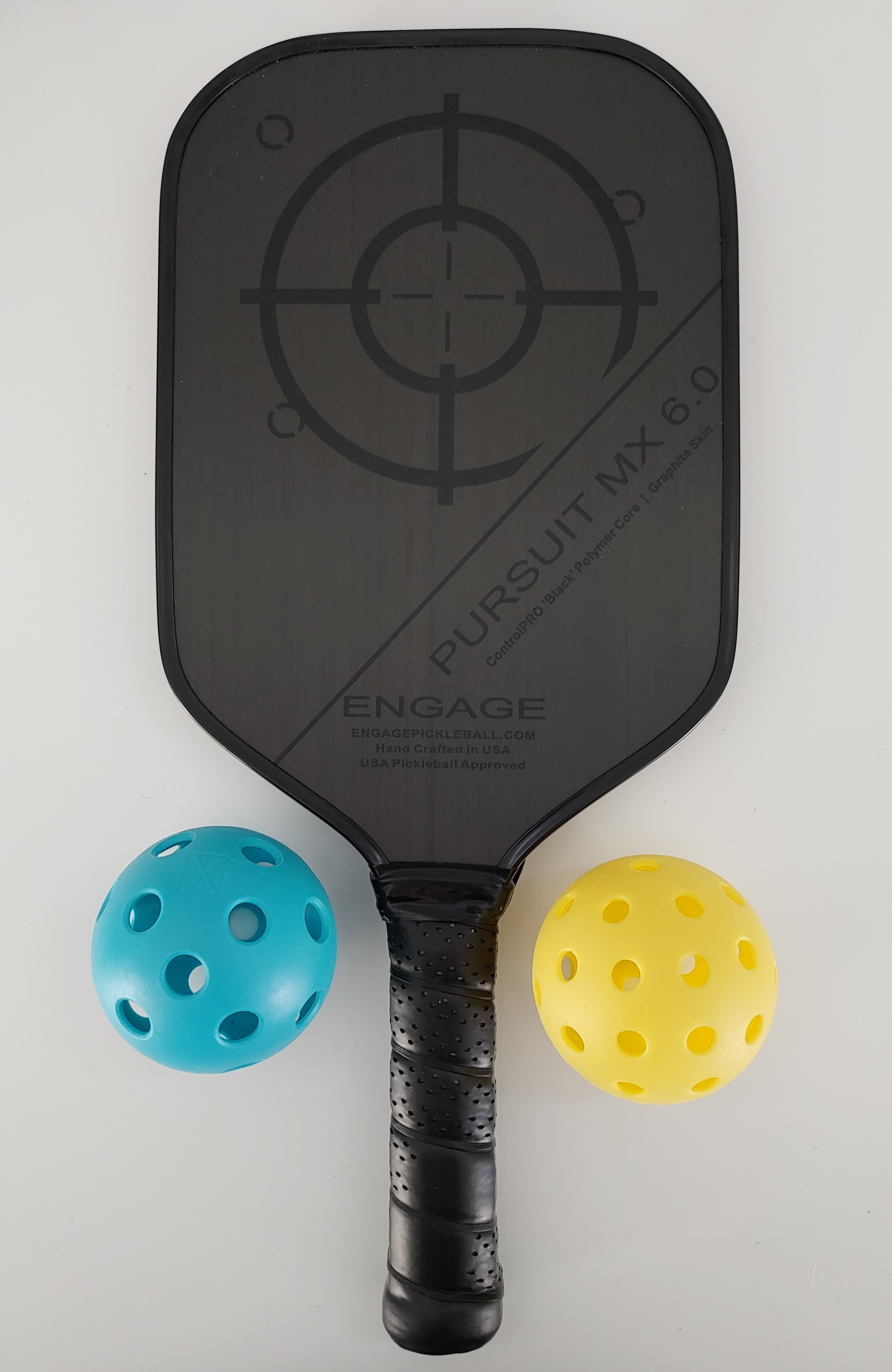
A pickleball paddle with one 26–hole pickleball (left) and one 40–hole pickleball (right)

=== Court ===
The regulation size of the court is 20 by 44 feet (6.1 by 13.4 m) for both doubles and singles, the same size as a doubles badminton court. A line seven feet (2.1 m) from the net is the non-volley line. twenty-two feet (6.7 m) from the net, the baseline marks the outer boundary of the playing area. The area bounded by the non-volley line, the sidelines, and the net, including the lines, is known as the non-volley zone or "kitchen". The area between the non-volley line and the baseline is the service court. A center line divides the service court into left and right sides. Regulated tournaments and games are usually played on a specialized polyurethane sport surface; however, courts are often set up on concrete, Astroturf, and indoor basketball courts.

=== Net ===
The net is 36 inches (0.91 m) high on the ends, the point where the net crosses the sidelines, and 34 inches (0.86 m) high at the center. The net posts should be 22 feet (6.7 m) from the inside of one post to the inside of the other post.

=== Ball ===
Balls must be made of a durable molded material with a smooth surface and must have between 26 and 40 evenly spaced circular holes. They must weigh between .78 and .935 ounces (22.1 and 26.5 g) and measure between 2.87 and 2.97 inches (73 and 75 mm) in diameter. Tournaments sanctioned by the USAP must choose from a list of preapproved balls found on the USAP website.

Balls with smaller holes are generally used for outdoor play to minimize the effects of wind, but any sanctioned ball may be used for either indoor or outdoor play.

=== Paddle ===
The combined length and width of the paddle shall not exceed 24 inches (0.61 m); the length cannot exceed 17 inches (0.43 m). There are no requirements regarding thickness or weight. The paddle must be made of a non-compressible material, and the surface of the paddle must be smooth. For USAP sanctioned games, paddles must be on the list of preapproved paddles found on the USAP website.

Modern paddles, such as those made by companies like JOOLA and Selkirk, use advanced materials like carbon fiber and polymer honeycomb cores to enhance control, power, and spin. One common paddle material is T700 Raw Carbon Fiber, which is valued for its durability and ability to generate spin.

== Order of play ==
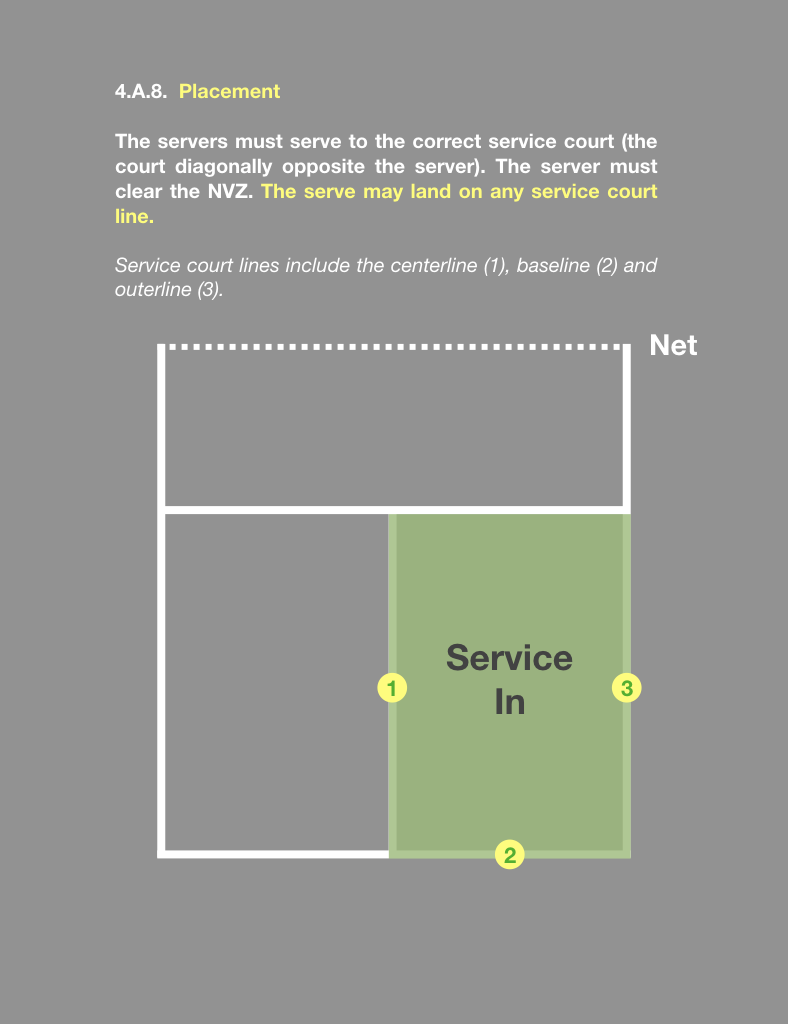
Service in

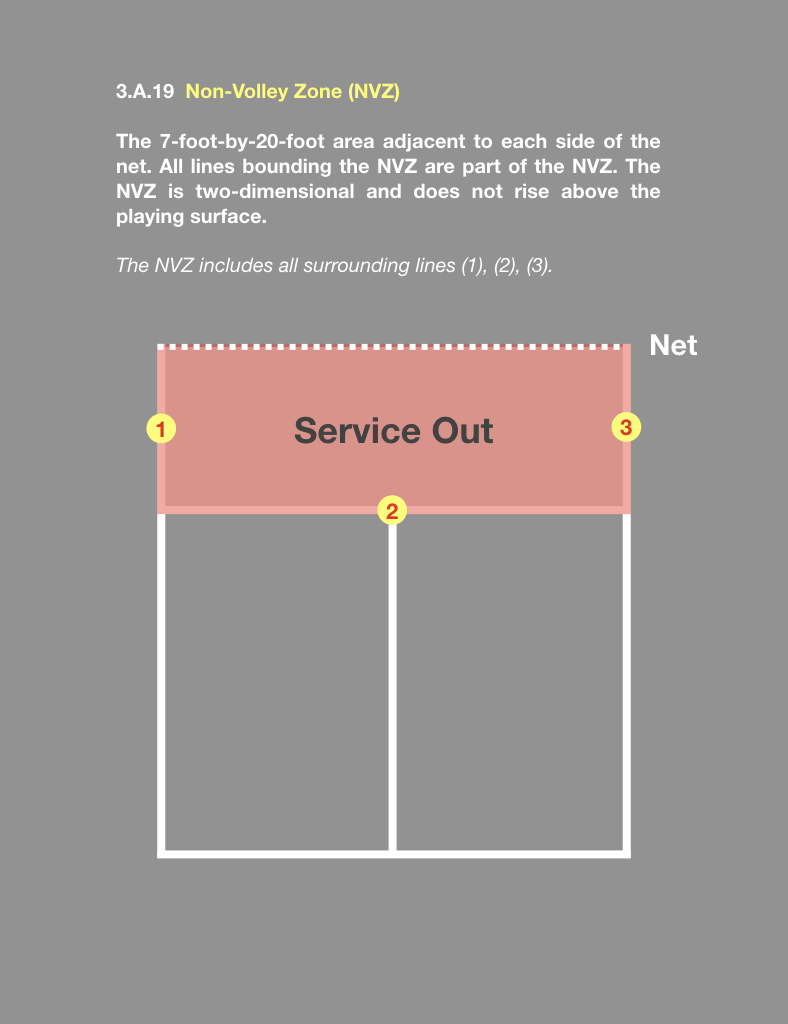
Service out

Any fair way of determining who will serve first and from which side is acceptable.

=== Announcing the score and serving ===
The score must be announced before each serve. If a referee is officiating the game, the referee announces the score, otherwise the serving player announces the score.

In doubles: the score has three parts; the serving team's score, the receiving team's score, and the server number, a "1" or "2", that indicates whether the server is the serving team's first or second server after a side out. The first serve of the game is always considered the serving team's second serve. The starting score in doubles is announced as "zero zero two (0 0 2)".

In singles: The score has two parts; the serving player's score and the receiving player's score. The starting score in singles is always announced as "zero zero".

The first serve of the game is made from right side of the serving teams's court or the "even service" court.

=== Two-bounce rule ===
A serve must land in the diagonally opposite service court on the opponent's side of the net (see "service in" diagram). The serve receiver must allow the ball to bounce once before returning the ball to the server's side of the net. Once the receiver has returned the ball over the net, the serving side must also allow the ball to bounce once before returning the ball to the non-serving side. This is known as the two-bounce rule or double bounce rule.

After the first two returns, either side may volley the ball—that is, return it before it bounces. The ball can never bounce more than once before it is returned. No player may volley the ball while standing in the non-volley zone or touching any of the lines around the non-volley zone, or "kitchen".

=== Remainder of play ===
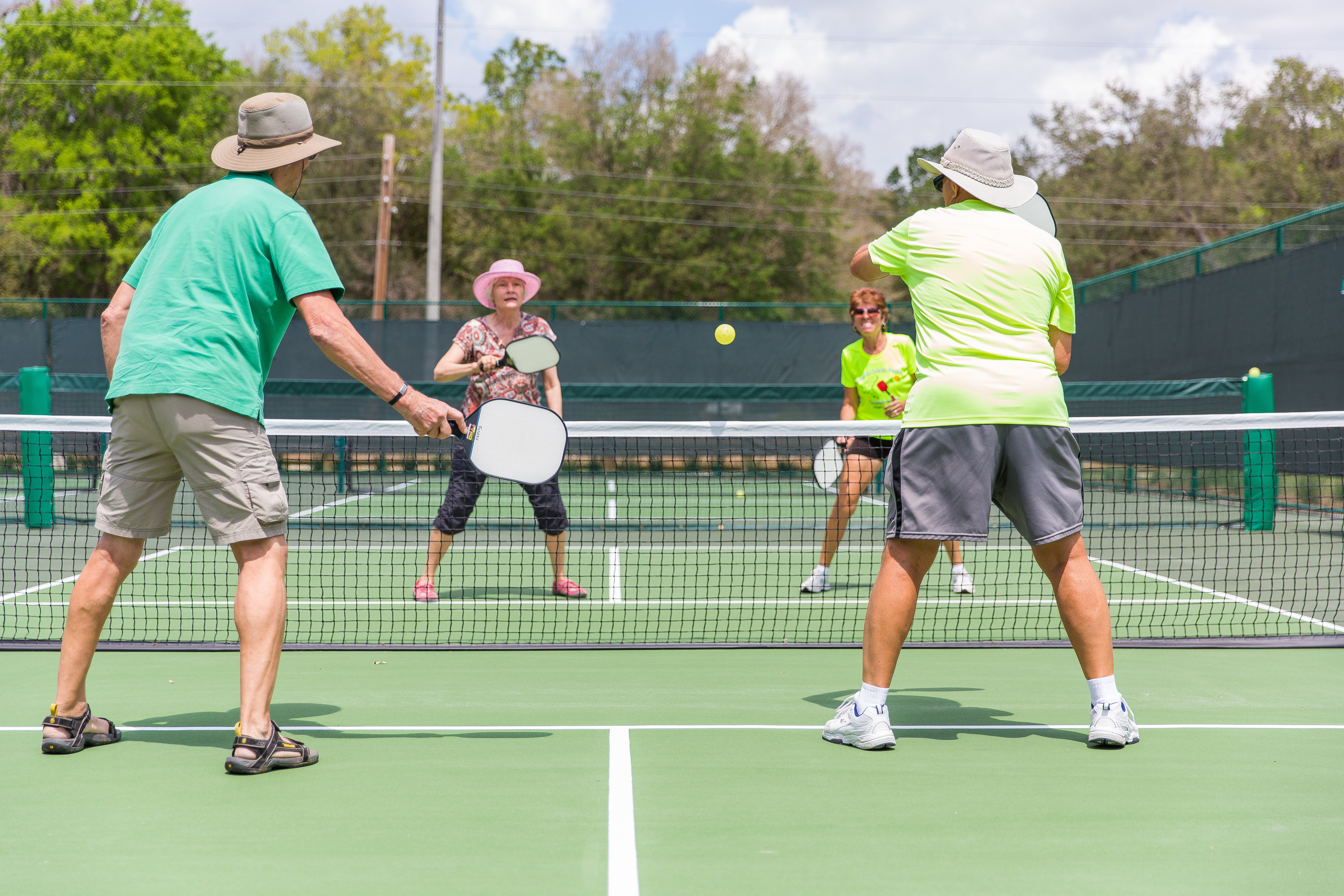
Doubles pickleball

A server continues to serve, alternating between the right and left service courts until their team commits a fault.

Doubles: At the beginning of a doubles game, the side serving first is allowed only one fault before their side is "out", called a side out, and the serve passes to their opponent. After the first side out of the game, each team is allowed two faults before a side out is called, allowing each of the players on a doubles team to serve before the serve passes to the other team. A team's second server must continue alternating between the right and left service courts from wherever their partner left off. For example, if their partner's last serve was from the right service court, the second server must start serving on the left service court. After a side out, the first serve is always initiated from the right serving area.

Singles: A side out is called each time the serving side commits a fault. If the serving player's score is even (including zero), they must serve from the right, or even, service court; otherwise, they must serve from the left, or odd, service court. Depending on the current score, the first serve after a side out can be from either the right or left service court.

== Manner of play ==
=== Scoring ===
Pickleball is usually played to a score of 11. The winning team must win by two points or play continues until one team wins by two. Tournament games may be played to 11, 15 or 21 points, with players rotating sides when either team reaches 6, 8 or 11 points, respectively.

Pickleball utilizes side out scoring, meaning only the serving side may score a point. The serving team earns one point each time the non-serving team commits a fault. Neither team earns a point when the serving team commits a fault. Since the score is always called as the serving side's score followed by the receiving side's score, the two scores are reversed whenever a side out occurs. For example, if the serving team faults when the score is "five three two" (two indicating the second server), a side out occurs, the other team becomes the new serving team, and the score is stated as "three five one".

=== Serving ===
When serving, the server must be behind the baseline on one side of the center line and serve the ball to the opponent's diagonally opposite service court. Two types of serves are permitted, a volley serve or a drop serve.

- Volley serve: When the server's paddle strikes a ball without the ball contacting the ground, it must be served with an underarm stroke so that contact with the ball is made below the waist in an upward arc, and the highest point on the paddle head must be below the wrist. In 2022, the USAPA announced a rule change that became effective in 2023: imparting spin onto the ball during its release from the hand (known as the 'spin serve') was banned.
- Drop serve: When a ball is dropped to the ground and allowed to bounce before the server's paddle strikes it, the ball cannot be tossed or impelled by the server in any way. There are no restrictions on how many times the ball can bounce before being hit, and unlike the volley serve, there are no restrictions on how the player must hit the ball.

=== Player positioning ===
Besides the server, there are no rules dictating where each player must stand when the serve is initiated, but the serve receiver usually starts behind the baseline until they know where the serve will bounce. The receiver's partner usually starts near the non-volley line also known as the kitchen line. The server's partner usually stays behind the baseline with the server until they know where the first service return will bounce. Some doubles partners use a strategy called stacking to ensure each partner can quickly move to the most advantageous side of the court, based on each partner's skill set, after each serve and/or service return.

Serving from the wrong side of the court, the wrong player serving or the wrong player returning a serve should be avoided. Though not a fault since USA Pickleball changed the rule in 2024, player positions should be corrected as soon as they are noticed. If noticed during a rally, the rally should be stopped and restarted. If noticed after the rally is finished, the rally stands.

Singles: In singles, a server's score will always be even (0, 2, 4, 6, 8, 10...) when serving from the right service court and odd (1, 3, 5, 7, 9...) when serving from the left service court.

=== Non-volley zone ===
No player may volley a ball while standing in the non-volley zone or touching any of the lines around the non-volley zone. A player may enter the non-volley zone to play a ball that has bounced and may stay there to play other balls that bounce, but the player must re-establish both feet outside the non-volley zone before playing a volley. The non-volley zone is the highlighted area and numbered lines shown in the "Service out" diagram. Unofficially, the non-volley zone is commonly referred to as "The Kitchen".

=== Rally and fault ===
After the serve, a rally continues until one side commits a fault resulting in a dead ball. Each team is responsible for making line calls on their side of the net. They may also ask an opponent for assistance; if the opponent saw the ball clearly and does then make a call, it is binding. If there is any doubt about whether the ball is out or in, the call should be made in favor of the opponent.

Faults include:

- either of the server's feet touches the baseline, the court, or the area outside the imaginary extensions of the centerline or sideline prior to striking the ball
- not hitting the serve into the opponent's diagonally opposite service court
- volleying the ball when returning a serve
- volleying the ball when returning the first service return
- not hitting the ball beyond the net
- not hitting the ball before it bounces twice on one side of the net
- hitting the ball so it lands out of bounds (outside the court lines)
- stepping into the non-volley zone, or touching any of lines around the non-volley zone, in the act of volleying the ball
- touching the net with any part of the body, clothing, paddle, or assistance device
- crossing the plane of the net, if not in the process of striking the ball

== Player ratings ==
Comparison of Pickleball Player Rating Systems
Rating System	Range	Increments	Developed By	Use Case
Self-Rating	1.0 – 6.0+	0.5	Player-assessed	Social play and non-sanctioned leagues
DUPR	2.0 – 8.0	0.001	Steve Kuhn / MLP	Dynamic rating for all match types (Global)
UTR-P	1.0 – 10.0	0.001	UTR Sports / APP	Tournament-verified and unverified play

Pickleball player ratings are used to differentiate the skill levels of players. This allows tournament directors to group players of similar skills, thereby increasing the competitiveness of brackets and matches. The three most common methods for classifying a pickleball player's skill level are: self-rating, Dynamic Universal Pickleball Rating (DUPR), and UTR-Pickleball (UTR-P).

A self-rating is determined when a player evaluates their own playing abilities against a table that describes progressively more difficult pickleball skills. The table of skills generally ranges from 1 to 6 in .5 increments. Self-ratings are often used by players who participate only in social play or non-sanctioned leagues and tournaments. Certified pickleball instructors may assist players in determining their self-rating score.

DUPR was developed by Steve Kuhn, owner and operator of the Dreamland family amusement center in Austin, Texas, and founder of Major league Pickleball. Originally called the Dreamland Universal Pickleball Rating, now the Dynamic Universal Pickleball Rating, DUPR scores range from 2 to 8 in .001 increments. DUPR includes a reliability rating that ranges from 1% to 100%. The reliability rating increases as more matches are played and recorded. A reliability rating over 60% is considered reliable.

UTR-Pickleball was developed by UTR Sports in collaboration with the Association of Pickleball Players. UTR Sports developed the Universal Tennis Rating (UTR) which was modified for use in pickleball. UTR-P scores range from 1 to 10 in .001 increments. UTR-P assigns a preliminary score, for individuals with a limited number of games, as well as a verified and unverified score. Verified scores are determined when enough match results are entered by verified tournament and league officials. Unverified scores result when only results from recreational or other non-sanctioned matches are reported. Prior to April 2024 the APP and USA Pickleball used the USA Pickleball Tournament Player Rating (UTPR) system to calculate player scores for USAP sanctioned tournaments. UTR-P scores are generally about one point higher than the retired UTPR scores.

== Professional pickleball ==
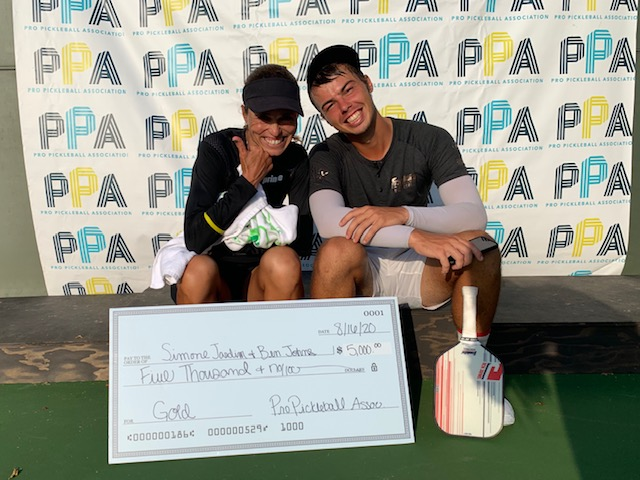
Ben Johns and mixed doubles partner Simone Jardim after winning gold at an August 2020 PPA Tournament

The popularity of pickleball has spurred the growth of investors and sponsors. As a result, two pro pickleball tours were independently formed in 2019, the Association of Pickleball Players (APP), originally the Association of Pickleball Professionals, and the Professional Pickleball Association (PPA). A professional pickleball league, Major League Pickleball (MLP), was formed in 2021, and a senior professional league, the National Pickleball League of Champions Pros (NPL), was formed in 2022.

=== United Pickleball Association ===
In 2023, the PPA and MLP merged under one umbrella organization, the United Pickleball Association (UPA).

Major League Pickleball, in partnership with the Pacific Pickleball League (PPL) of Australia, announced an expansion to Australia in September 2023. The PPL was rebranded as MLP Australia and held its inaugural event September 2023.

In April 2024, the United Pickleball Association, in cooperation with Global Sports of India, announced an expansion of the PPL and MLP to India. The intention was to start selling in time for the 2025/2026 season. While this collaboration failed to materialize, in November 2024 the UPA announced the formation of the PPA Tour Asia and MLP Asia under the UPA Asia banner. The PPA Tour Asia is expected to launch in 2025, and the MLP Asia is expected to launch in 2026.

=== Pickleball World Rankings ===
In July 2024 a new international professional pickleball organization was launched, the Pickleball World Rankings (PWR). The organization was founded by Pranav Kohli, in collaboration with the Times Group of India and Pickleball Asia. Players will earn points to improve their PWR ranking by participating in PWR World Tour tournaments. Top point earners will participate in the PWR World Series. Each event is expected to offer $500,000 to $1 million in prize money.

== Governing body ==
As of June 2025 no pickleball organization has received recognition from the International Olympic Committee (IOC), or any other international sports oversight body, as the official world-wide governing body for the sport of pickleball. However, there are several organizations vying to be the global governing body for the sport.

In 1984 USA Pickleball became the de facto governing body for all pickleball because it was the first and only organization to step into the role when it was founded as the United States Amateur Pickleball Association. It also published the first official rule book that same year. Recognizing the growth of pickleball outside of the United States, in 2010 USA Pickleball helped establish the International Federation of Pickleball (IFP), now the International Pickleball Federation (IPF), to serve as a world-wide governing body. USA Pickleball would continue as the national governing body for pickleball in the United States.

In 2018 a second international governing body, the World Pickleball Federation (WPF) was established challenging the IPF. In 2022, USA Pickleball, and several other member nations, withdrew from the IPF, and in 2023 they established a third international governing body, the Global Pickleball federation (GPF). Also in 2023 a fourth organization, the Pickleball International Committee (PIC), was established claiming to be the global governing body for pickleball.

Meanwhile, professional pickleball continued to grow and attract more money. In 2024, after the PPA and MLP merged into the UPA, the UPA announced the launch of UPA of America (UPA-A), a competing governing body to USA Pickleball. With the expansion of the UPA to Australia, India, and Canada, the UPA has become a transnational organization, resulting in the UPA-A becoming an international governing body through UPA events.

In November 2024 the IPF and WPF announced that they had agreed to merge their two organizations, and in June 2025 the member nations voted to affirm the merger. The merged organization will operate under the Unified World Pickleball Federation (UWPF) name, and adopt the IPF's core mission of "No country left behind". In February 2025, it was announced that the transition team was recommending that the newly merged entity be based in Lausanne, Switzerland, home of the IOC.

== Multi-sport events ==
=== Olympic recognition ===
All of the organizations claiming to be the global governing body of pickleball are pursuing recognition by the International Olympic Committee and possible inclusion at the Olympics as a demonstration sport. A 2022 article by Sports Illustrated concluded the game would not likely be seen at the Olympics before 2032.

Pickleball was accepted as a demonstration sport at the July 2022 Maccabiah Games, considered the third largest sporting event in the world. This marked the first time pickleball appeared at an event sanctioned by the International Olympic Committee.

The 2023 African Games, also sanctioned by the International Olympic Committee, included Pickleball as a demonstration sport. The event was held March 11-15th at the University of Ghana campus in Accra. The Confederation of African Pickleball and the Global Pickleball Federation are exploring the possibility of holding a pickleball tournament at the 2027 African Games in Egypt.

=== Other multi-sport events ===
Since 2003 pickleball has been played at the World Senior Games, held annually in St. George, Utah. Pickleball was first played at the National Senior Games, in the United States, in 2013.

Pickleball is expected to be included in the 2027 Invictus Games that are scheduled to be held in Birmingham, England. Carlisle-based Gaz Golightly, a military veteran and amputee, lobbied for inclusion of the sport after trying various wheelchair sports and deciding pickleball was by far the most inclusive for wheelchair users.

== Rule variations ==
=== Mini-singles ===
USA Pickleball first included rules for mini-singles in the 2024 Official Rulebook. Mini-singles, sometimes called "skinny singles", follow basically the same rules as regular singles, except only half of each player's court is considered "in play" during each rally. The half of the court that is in play is determined by each player's score. If a player's score is zero or even, then the right side of their court is in play. If their score is odd, then the left side of their court is in play. The other half of their court, the half that is not in play, is out of bounds. A player incurs a fault if that player hits the ball onto the other player's side of the court that is not in play.

An additional line should be drawn that extends the center line on both sides of the net through the non-volley zone. This line divides the non-volley zone in two, thereby establishing which side of the non-volley zone is in play, and which is out of bounds.

=== Wheelchair pickleball ===
Wheelchair pickleball, sometimes called adaptive pickleball or para pickleball, was officially recognized as a competitive form of pickleball by USA Pickleball in 2016. The modified rules that pertain to wheelchair pickleball are incorporated throughout the Official Rulebook. Sanctioned tournaments may have separate divisions for wheelchair players, or they may allow standing players and wheelchair players to compete against each other. When a game involves both wheelchair and standing players, each player must abide by their respective rules. Standing players will adhere to the standing pickleball rules, and the wheelchair players will adhere to the wheelchair pickleball rules.

Wheelchair players follow the standard rules with only a few modifications. A player's wheelchair is considered part of the player's body, and all rules that apply to the body also apply to the player's wheelchair, except the smaller front wheels of the wheelchair are allowed to touch the non-volley zone line during a volley. A player in a wheelchair is allowed two bounces instead of one. When a player in a wheelchair is serving the ball, they must be in a stationary position. They are then allowed one push before striking the ball for service. When the player strikes the ball, neither of the rear wheels of the wheelchair are allowed to touch any baseline, sideline, center line, or extended center or sideline.

=== Professional tour rules ===
APP Tour games are sanctioned by USA Pickleball and follow all rules established by USA Pickleball. The PPA Tour is not sanctioned and has chosen not to adopt some recent rule changes for professional and senior professional matches. Non-professional PPA Tour matches will continue to follow all rules in the USAP rulebook. The specific rules that the PPA deviates from for professional matches are: the drop serve, the paddle swipe or chainsaw serve, and let serves.

The PPA has not instituted the drop serve and does not permit them in professional PPA matches. New USAP rules allow a player to touch the ball with only the hand releasing the ball, thereby making the chainsaw serve illegal in APP games. The PPA continues to permit the chainsaw serve in professional PPA matches. Let serves that hit the net but land in the correct service area are considered valid serves by USAP rules, but such serves must be replayed in PPA professional matches. If a second let serve occurs when the serve is replayed, it is a fault for PPA servers.

=== MLP team format ===
Major League Pickleball uses a team format called MLPlay, each team consisting of at least two men and two women. A match between teams is determined by the best of four games: one game of men's doubles, one game of women's doubles and two games of mixed doubles. If tied after four games, a dreambreaker singles game is played where after every four rallies the players on each team are rotated.

Doubles games use traditional side-out scoring, but dreambreaker games use rally scoring where the team that wins the rally scores a point regardless of who is serving. In rally scoring a team must score the game-winning point on their serve. If a team reaches game point, their score will remain frozen until they win a rally on their serve, or until they lose their game-point advantage. The other team's score does not remain frozen. The other team can continue earning points when they win a rally on the other team's serve. Doubles games are played to 11, and dreambreaker games are played to 21.

== Injuries ==
The rise of competitive play has also led to more injuries, according to recent analyses by the insurance industry which found treatment costs for pickleball injuries have increased as participation has grown. Common pickleball injuries involve muscles, joints and tendons, especially in the shoulder, elbow and wrist (which proper technique, equipment, warm-up routines and injury prevention can help reduce). Advocates of the sport's growth say that pickleball is an activity that can provide exercise and social connections for players of all ages and skill levels, though fracture injuries associated with the sport reportedly experienced a 90-fold increase from 2002 to 2022, with a majority of injuries among players aged 60 to 69.

== Noise level ==
Video of a pickleball game with sound

When the hard pickleball paddle strikes the hard ball, it produces a sharp popping sound. The constant sound during play has generated conflict between pickleball court owners and nearby property owners. The noise, combined with the rapid rise in pickleball's popularity, has produced an intense backlash against the sport in communities across the United States.

In 2023, the American governing body of the sport, USA Pickleball, stated that “working together with manufacturers and the entire industry, we can develop quieter options that benefit everyone."

In September 2020, one park in the Portland metropolitan area had to institute a ban on pickleball, despite having just installed new pickleball courts five months earlier. Residents nearest to the pickleball courts said they could not hold conversations inside their homes due to the noise from the pickleball courts. Despite the ban, people still used the pickleball courts the following year. In June 2021, at a West Linn City Council meeting, one resident said the noise resulted in family gatherings being "... wrought [sic] with discord and physically debilitating stress." Some described the noise as "trauma-inducing". Similar noise issues were raised in 2023 by residents of an apartment building adjacent to a pickleball court in Halifax, Nova Scotia, Canada.

=== TYPTI ===
TYPTI is a sport that uses a strung racquet, a foam ball, with new scoring and rules. It plays on top of a pickleball court and is being played all over the country and around the world. It is near noiseless so it is becoming a tool to appease neighborhoods complaining about pickleball noise.

== In popular culture ==
=== World records ===
There are several published Guinness World Records for the sport of pickleball, one of which is the longest pickleball volley rally, consisting of 10,532 consecutive shots, lasting 2 hours and 44 seconds set by Angelo and Ettore Rossetti on October 10, 2022.

=== Games ===
- Pickleball Smash is a video game released by GameMill Entertainment in October 2023. The game was developed by 1PXL Games to run on the Xbox One or Xbox Series X and Series S platforms.
- Pickleball Blast, a table-top game inspired by the sport of pickleball, was released in 2024 by Moose Toys, an Australian-owned toy development and distribution company. The two-player children's game requires players to use a hand-held mechanical paddle to hit a plastic pickle back and forth over the net while trying to flip the lid on the opponent's pickle jars.
- PPA Pickleball Tour 2025 is a video game released by FarSight Studios in 2024. The game includes likenesses of top pickleball players.

== See also ==
- Glossary of pickleball
- List of pickleball organizations
- List of racket sports
- List of U.S. state sports
- Similar sports:
  - Jombola
  - Paddle tennis, also called Pop tennis
  - Padel
  - Platform tennis
