= List of professional pickleball players =

This list of professional pickleball players includes players who currently, or have in the past, played in professional pickleball tournaments.

Professional pickleball tours and leagues:

- Those associated with the Pickleball World Rankings
  - APP - Association of Pickleball Players
  - CPA - Canadian Pickleball Association
  - NPLA - National Pickleball League Australia
- Those associated with the United Pickleball Association
  - PPA - Professional Pickleball Association
  - PPAA - Professional Pickleball Association Australia
  - MLP - Major League Pickleball
  - MLPA - Major League Pickleball Australia
- Other pro pickleball tours & leagues
  - NPL - National Pickleball League of Champions Pros

== Men ==
Name	Native Country	Hometown	DOB & Age	Height	Dom Hand	Turned pro	Pro Pickleball Tours & Leagues	Other Sports Background	Ref
Mohaned "Mo" Alhouni	Libya	Tripoli	February 17, 1996 (age 30)	6 ft 4 in (1.93 m)	Left	2024	PPA, MLP	Tennis (Gustavus Adolphus College)	
Motasem "Mota" Alhouni	Libya	Tripoli	January 8, 1992 (age 34)	5 ft 11 in (1.80 m)	Right	2024	PPA	Tennis (Gustavus Adolphus College)	
Christian Alshon	United States	Boca Raton, FL	July 8, 2000 (age 26)	6 ft 2 in (1.88 m)	Right	2021	PPA, MLP	Tennis (University of Chicago)	
Julian Arnold	United States	San Luis Obispo, CA	March 3, 1999 (age 27)	6 ft 3 in (1.91 m)	Right	2022	PPA	Tennis (UCLA)	
Dekel Bar	Israel	Ra'anana	March 15, 1993 (age 33)	6 ft 3 in (1.91 m)	Right	2018	PPA	Tennis	
Roscoe Bellamy	United States	Pacific Palisades, CA	January 26, 2000 (age 26)	6 ft 5 in (1.96 m)	Right	2023	PPA	Tennis (UCLA)	
Cason Campbell	United States	Palmetto Bay, FL		5 ft 10 in (1.78 m)	Right	2024	PPA	Soccer, Tennis	
Andrei Daescu	Romania	Bucharest	August 28, 1988 (age 37)	6 ft 5 in (1.96 m)	Right	2022	PPA	Tennis (University of Oklahoma)	
Ryler DeHeart	United States	Tampa, FL	January 3, 1984 (age 42)	6 ft 0 in (1.83 m)	Left	2022		Tennis (University of Illinois Urbana-Champaign)	
Jay Devilliers	France	Rosny-sous-Bois	December 18, 1994 (age 31)	6 ft 3 in (1.91 m)	Right	2020		Tennis (Wichita State University)	
Quang Duong	Vietnam		February 24, 2006 (age 20)	5 ft 11 in (1.80 m)	Right	2023	PPA, MLP	Tennis, Paddle Tennis	
Tom Evans	Australia	Sydney	March 29, 2001 (age 25)	6 ft 1 in (1.85 m)	Right	2023	NPLA, PPA, MLP	Tennis	
Zane Ford	United States	Mars, PA		6 ft 3 in (1.91 m)	Right	2023	PPA	Tennis	
Dylan Frazier	United States	Ashland, MO	December 8, 2001 (age 24)	5 ft 11 in (1.80 m)	Right	2021		Baseball	
Yuta Funemizu	Japan				Right	2024	PPA	Soft Tennis	
Connor Garnett	United States	Bellevue, WA		5 ft 11 in (1.80 m)	Right	2022	PPA, MLP	Tennis (Santa Clara University)	
Augustus "Augie" Ge	United States	Phoenix, AZ		6 ft 1 in (1.85 m)	Left	2023	PPA	Tennis (University of New Mexico, University of Arizona), Table Tennis (Brown University)	
James Ignatowich	United States	Darien, CT	May 5, 2000 (age 26)	6 ft 3 in (1.91 m)	Right	2022		Tennis (Vanderbilt University)	
Ben Johns	United States	Gaithersburg, MD	March 18, 1999 (age 27)	6 ft 1 in (1.85 m)	Right	2016			
Collin Johns	United States	Columbus, OH	June 15, 1993 (age 33)	5 ft 11 in (1.80 m)	Right	2018		Tennis, Table Tennis, Baseball	
Hunter Johnson	United States	Taos, NM	June 2, 1994 (age 32)	6 ft 1 in (1.85 m)	Right	2018		Tennis (Southern Methodist University)	
JW Johnson (James W Johnson)	United States	Pittsburg, KS	July 4, 2003 (age 23)	5 ft 10 in (1.78 m)	Right	2020		Tennis	
Noe Khlif	France	Marseille	April 28, 1998 (age 28)	5 ft 10 in (1.78 m)	Right	2024	APP, PPA, MLP	Tennis (University of Illinois)	
CJ Klinger (Carson Klinger)	United States	Granville, OH		6 ft 3 in (1.91 m)	Left	2023	PPA	Tennis, Table Tennis	
AJ Koller	United States	St. Louis, MO		6 ft 1 in (1.85 m)	Right	2020	PPA	Ice Hockey (University of Colorado), Tennis	
Jaume Martinez Vich	Spain	Mallorca	October 21, 1993 (age 32)	5 ft 8 in (1.73 m)	Right	2023	PPA, MLP	Tennis (Hawaii Pacific University)	
Tyson McGuffin	United States	Chelan, WA	December 16, 1989 (age 36)	5 ft 10 in (1.78 m)	Right	2016		Tennis (Scottsdale Community College), Wrestling	
Altaf Merchant	India			5 ft 7 in (1.70 m)	Right			Tennis (Southern Illinois University)	
Zane Navratil	United States	Racine, WI	November 2, 1995 (age 30)	5 ft 9 in (1.75 m)	Right	2020		Tennis	
Riley Newman	United States	Whidbey Island, WA	June 3, 1993 (age 33)	6 ft 2 in (1.88 m)	Right	2018	PPA, MLP	Tennis (Seattle University)	
Eric Oncins	Brazil	São Paulo		6 ft 2 in (1.88 m)	Right	2021	PPA	Tennis (Florida Gulf Coast University)	
Hayden Patriquin	United States	Yucaipa, CA	September 20, 2005 (age 20)	5 ft 9 in (1.75 m)	Right	2022	PPA, MLP	Baseball	
Jack Sock	United States	Lincoln, NE	September 24, 1992 (age 33)	6 ft 3 in (1.91 m)	Right	2024		Tennis (University of Nebraska–Lincoln)	
Federico Staksrud	Argentina	Buenos Aires	October 15, 1996 (age 29)	5 ft 11 in (1.80 m)	Right	2021		Tennis (University of New Orleans)	
Gabriel Tardio	Bolivia			6 ft 1 in (1.85 m)	Right	2022		Tennis	
Pablo Tellez	Colombia	Bogotá		6 ft 0 in (1.83 m)	Left	2022		Tennis (University of West Florida)	
Pesa Teoni	American Samoa			5 ft 10 in (1.78 m)	Right	2023	PPA	Soccer, Volleyball, Rugby	
Thomas Wilson	United States	San Antonio, TX	February 7, 1990 (age 36)	5 ft 10 in (1.78 m)	Right	2020	PPA	Tennis (Purdue University, University of Texas)	
Matt Wright	United States		1977 (age 48–49)	6 ft 2 in (1.88 m)	Right	2016	PPA	Tennis (University of Michigan)	
Danny Wuerffel	United States	Pensacola, FL	May 27, 1974 (age 52)	6 ft 1 in (1.85 m)			MLP, NPL	American football (University of Florida, NFL)	
Donald Young	United States	Chicago, IL	July 23, 1989 (age 37)	6 ft 0 in (1.83 m)	Left	2024	PPA, MLP	Tennis	

== Women ==
Name	Native Country	Hometown	DOB & Age	Height	Dom Hand	Turned pro	Pro Pickleball Tour(s)	Other Sports Background	Ref
Hurricane Tyra Black	United States	Boca Raton, FL	March 2, 2001 (age 25)		Right				
Maggie Brascia	United States	Mission Viejo, CA		5 ft 4 in (1.63 m)	Right	2022	PPA, MLP	Tennis	
Mary Brascia	United States	Mission Viejo, CA		5 ft 4 in (1.63 m)	Right	2022	PPA, MLP		
Anna Bright	United States	Fort Worth, TX	October 8, 1999 (age 26)	5 ft 8 in (1.73 m)	Right	2022		Tennis (UC Berkeley)	
Eugenie Bouchard	Canada	Montreal	February 25, 1994 (age 32)	5 ft 10 in (1.78 m)	Right	2024		Tennis	
Cailyn Campbell	United States	Palmetto Bay, FL	May 13, 2010 (age 16)	5 ft 7 in (1.70 m)	Right	2025		Tennis	
Kaitlyn Christian	United States	Orange, CA	January 13, 1992 (age 34)	5 ft 9 in (1.75 m)	Right	2024			
Salome Devidze	Georgia	Tbilisi	January 2, 1986 (age 40)		Right	2022			
Meghan Dizon	United States	Murrieta, CA		5 ft 9 in (1.75 m)	Right	2021			
Jessie Irvine	United States	Cary, NC	June 22, 1989 (age 37)	5 ft 8 in (1.73 m)	Right	2019	PPA	Tennis, Paddle tennis	
Lea Jansen	United States	Valleyford, WA		5 ft 10 in (1.78 m)	Right	2022	PPA	Tennis (Washington State University)	
Simone Jardim	Brazil	Santa Maria, Rio Grande do Sul	November 7, 1979 (age 46)	5 ft 8 in (1.73 m)	Right	2015			
Jorja Johnson	United States	Pittsburgh, KS		5 ft 9 in (1.75 m)	Right	2020	PPA, MLP		
Allyce Jones	United States	Pleasant Grove, UT	October 25, 1987 (age 38)	5 ft 2 in (1.57 m)	Right	2021	PPA	Softball, Tennis, Volleyball (Utah Valley University)	
Lucy Kovalova	Slovakia			5 ft 8 in (1.73 m)	Right	2015			
Catherine Parenteau	Canada	Montreal	August 26, 1994 (age 31)	5 ft 9 in (1.75 m)	Right	2016			
Tina Pisnik	Slovenia	Maribor	February 19, 1981 (age 45)	5 ft 7.5 in (1.71 m)	Right	2022			
Rachel Rohrabacher	United States	Tampa, FL		5 ft 4 in (1.63 m)	Right	2023		Tennis	
Sofia Sewing	United States			5 ft 7 in (1.70 m)	Right	2024	APP	Tennis	
Callie Jo Smith	United States			5 ft 10 in (1.78 m)	Right	2021		Tennis	
Marietta "Etta" Tuionetoa (previously Etta Wright)	New Zealand	Menlo Park, CA		5 ft 10 in (1.78 m)	Right	2022	PPA, MLP	Tennis (Brigham Young University–Hawaii)	
Anna Leigh Waters	United States	Delray Beach, FL	January 26, 2007 (age 19)	5 ft 6 in (1.68 m)	Right	2019			
