= Jay Devilliers =

French professional pickleball player (born 1994)

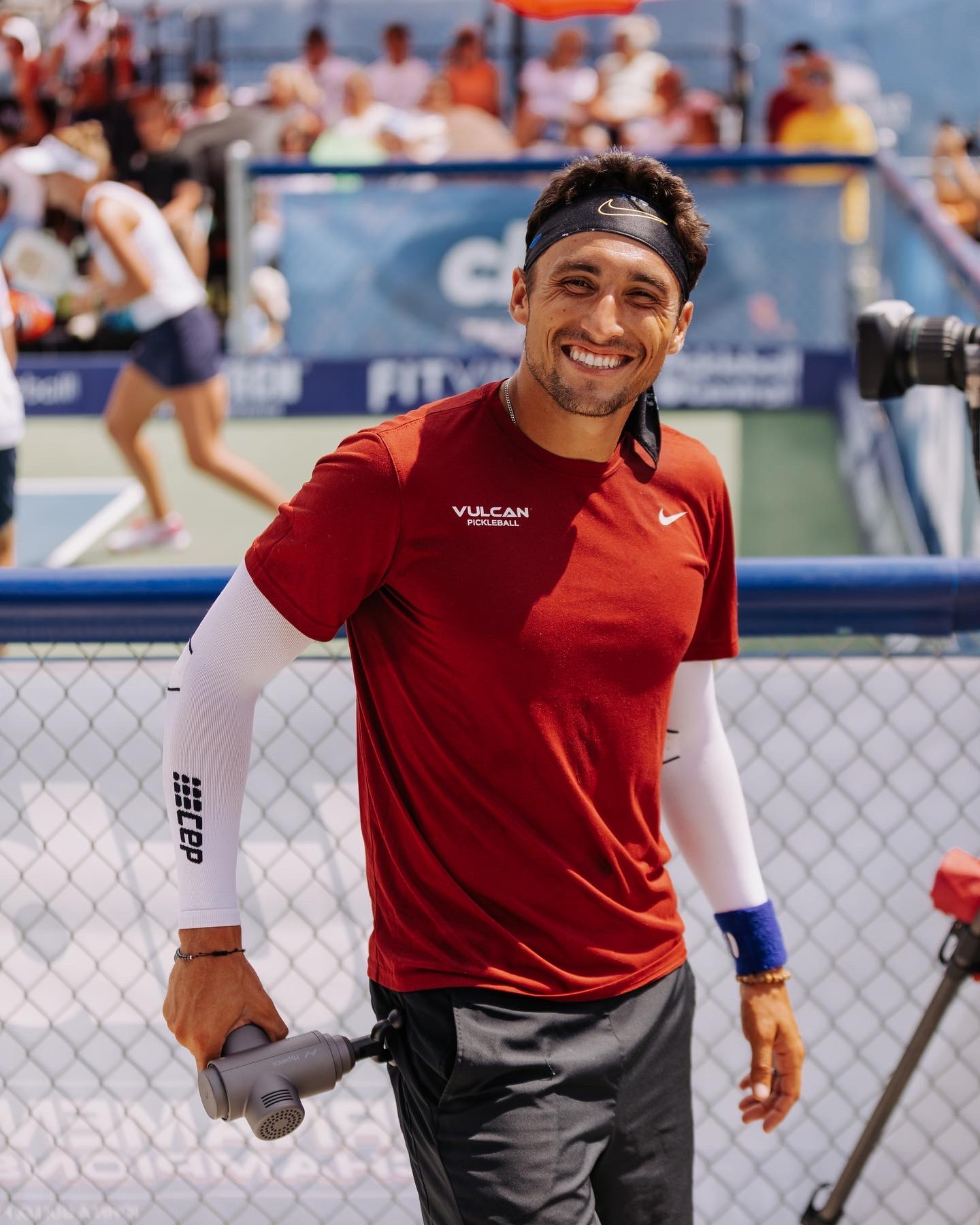
- Full name: Jocelyn Devilliers
- Country (sports): France
- Residence: Naples, Florida, U.S.
- Born: December 18, 1994 (age 31) Rosny-sous-Bois, France
- Height: 6 ft 3 in (191 cm)
- Turned pro: 2020
- Plays: Right-handed
- College: Wichita State University
- Official website: jaydevilliers.com

Doubles
- Highest ranking: No. 1 (APP, 2021); No. 5 (PPA)

Jocelyn "Jay" Devilliers (born December 18, 1994) is a French professional pickleball player and coach. A former NCAA Division I tennis player at Wichita State University, he played his first professional pickleball event in 2019 and turned professional full time in 2020. He was ranked No. 1 on the APP Tour in 2021 and has reached career-high rankings of No. 2 in men's singles and mixed doubles on the PPA Tour. He plays for the Atlanta Bouncers in Major League Pickleball, and in 2026 he became director of The Academy at the USOP National Pickleball Center in Naples, Florida.

Devilliers has won 19 APP Tour titles and is one of five men to have won an APP Triple Crown. On the PPA Tour he won the 2021 PPA Championships in mixed doubles and the 2022 Selkirk Labs Showdown in men's doubles. In 2026 he won the mixed doubles title at the US Open Pickleball Championships with Anna Leigh Waters, and he led France's first national team at the Pickleball World Cup.

== Early life and education ==
Devilliers was born in Rosny-sous-Bois, near Paris, on December 18, 1994, and is the youngest of six children. He speaks French, Spanish and English. As a child he played soccer, tennis, handball, swimming, squash, badminton, table tennis and skiing, and did best at tennis and soccer. He chose tennis, and in 2009, at the age of 14, he left home for Barcelona, where he spent three years at the Bruguera Tennis Academy. He finished high school there, studying in Spanish.

After a serious injury ended his hopes of a professional tennis career, he accepted a tennis scholarship to Wichita State University and joined the men's team in 2013. He played four seasons for the Shockers, finishing with career records of 58–53 in singles and 55–41 in doubles. In 2015–16 he helped Wichita State win both the Missouri Valley Conference regular-season and tournament titles. He was named All-MVC in 2017, received the conference's Elite 18 Award in 2016, and was a three-time MVC First Team Scholar-Athlete. He also played qualifying events on the professional tennis tour, including ITF Futures tournaments and an ATP Challenger in Blois, France. He reached career-high ITA rankings of No. 86 in singles and No. 26 in doubles, and he graduated with a degree in international business. As a senior he got an internship at the 2017 US Open, where he worked as a hitting partner for professional players, including Rafael Nadal. He did the same at the 2018 US Open.

== Pickleball career ==
=== Early career and APP Tour ===
Devilliers on court

In 2019 Devilliers became pickleball director at Chicken N Pickle, a pickleball venue in Wichita. That year he entered his first professional event, the US Open Pickleball Championships in Naples, Florida, in April 2019, where he reached the singles quarterfinals. He started playing professionally full time in 2020.

He played mostly on the APP Tour in 2020 and 2021. At the 2021 World Pickleball Championship he was the runner-up in both men's singles and men's doubles. In 2021 he won 13 APP titles and was ranked No. 1 on the APP Tour in singles, men's doubles and mixed doubles. He is one of five men to have won an APP Triple Crown, meaning titles in singles, men's doubles and mixed doubles at the same event, and he ranks in the APP's all-time top 10 for career gold medals and career medals. His last APP event before a long break was in January 2022. By then he had 18 APP titles and 31 medals.

After leaving the United Pickleball Association, which runs the PPA Tour, Devilliers returned to the APP Tour in September 2026 at the Overland Park Open. In October he won silver in men's doubles with Tanner Tomassi at the Columbus Open. At the APP Arizona Open in Mesa on November 12–15, 2026, he won the mixed doubles title with Domenika Turkovic, his first APP mixed doubles title since January 2022, and took bronze in men's doubles with Tomassi.

=== PPA Tour ===
Devilliers leaping at the net during a professional match

On the PPA Tour, Devilliers has won two titles. The first was mixed doubles with Jessie Irvine at the 2021 PPA Championships in Las Vegas, where he also took bronze in men's singles. The second was men's doubles with Ben Johns at the 2022 Selkirk Labs Showdown. His career-high PPA rankings are No. 2 in men's singles and mixed doubles and No. 5 in men's doubles. He finished 2022 ranked No. 3 in both singles and mixed doubles. At the 2022 PPA Championships, a shot he hit around the net post against Zane Navratil was No. 5 on ESPN's SportsCenter Top 10. He qualified for the PPA's season-ending Masters Finals in all three events in 2023 and 2024, and in men's doubles with Jaume Martinez Vich in 2026. He has also played PPA Tour events outside the United States, including in Vietnam, Australia and India.

He missed the second half of the 2024 season with a knee injury, which needed surgery. At the season-ending 2025 PPA Daytona Beach Open he won bronze in mixed doubles with Callie Smith. In 2026 he won bronze in men's doubles with Jaume Martinez Vich at the PPA Texas Open.

=== 2026 US Open and Nationals ===
Devilliers (left) and Harsh Mehta with their men's doubles bronze medals at the 2026 USA Pickleball National Championships in San Diego

At the 2026 US Open Pickleball Championships in Naples, Devilliers and Anna Leigh Waters won the mixed doubles title on April 18. They beat Casey Diamond and Sofia Sewing 10–12, 11–2, 11–9. He was also the runner-up in men's singles, losing the final to Dusty Boyer. In November 2026 he won bronze in men's doubles with Harsh Mehta at the USA Pickleball National Championships in San Diego.

=== France national team ===
In 2026 Devilliers was selected for France's first national pickleball team, chosen by the French Tennis Federation for the Pickleball World Cup in Da Nang, Vietnam. France was seeded third in the Open team event and was led by Devilliers. The team reached the quarterfinals. In its 4–3 win over Germany in the round of 32, he won the men's doubles with Emilien Burnel and a mixed doubles match with Clara Contis Ramirez.

=== International events ===
In August 2024 Devilliers was the headline international player at the Monsoon Pickleball Championship 2.0 in Mumbai, India. He won the professional men's doubles title with Quang Duong, and was the runner-up in mixed doubles with Emilia Schmidt.

=== Major League Pickleball ===
Devilliers playing for Miami Pickleball Club in Major League Pickleball

On January 31, 2026, the Atlanta Bouncers acquired Devilliers from Miami Pickleball Club in exchange for Eric Roddy and cash. Atlanta then kept him on its roster for the 2026 season. At the 2026 MLP Mid-Season Tournament he was struck in the head by a paddle during a match against the Los Angeles Mad Drops. He was back on court for Atlanta the next day.

== Playing style ==
Devilliers is known as "the Flying Frenchman" and has reached the top of the sport in all three divisions. Fellow professional Anna Bright has pointed to his power, size and effort. He played tennis with a one-handed backhand but has since added a two-handed backhand to his pickleball game. He has said the shot "didn't come very naturally" to him.

== Coaching and promotion of the sport ==
Devilliers being interviewed on PickleballTV

In 2026 Devilliers was named director of The Academy at the USOP National Pickleball Center in Naples, Florida. He also runs Smash Pickleball Academy in Toulouse, France, and holds camps internationally. With fellow professional Callie Smith he hosts pickleball getaways, including camps in Cancún and at Club Med Ixtapa in Mexico. He owns a professional team in the Canadian National Pickleball League. He has worked to grow pickleball in Europe, especially in France, including promoting it at the French Open. French-focused media have described him as France's best-known pickleball player.

== Sponsorship ==
Devilliers being interviewed after winning bronze at the 2026 USA Pickleball National Championships

As of August 2023, Devilliers was sponsored by Bemer Group, Ultimate RepairX and Vulcan, and played with a Vulcan signature paddle. In March 2026 he signed with paddle maker Six Zero Pickleball, and he plays with its Coral paddle. His other current sponsors are the apparel brand Leorêver and the shoe brand Winners Edge, whose shoes he has worn since 2024. He is represented by the sports agency Octagon.

== Personal life ==
Devilliers met his wife, Aleksandra, a fellow tennis player, while training in Barcelona. They have four children. They lived in Wichita, Kansas, for more than a decade, and moved to Naples, Florida, in 2026 when he took up his role at the National Pickleball Center.

=== Charity work ===
In July 2024 Devilliers and his wife started a fundraiser called "30 for 30" to mark his 30th birthday. The money went to Rainbows United, a Wichita charity that supports children with special needs and their families. The goal was $30,000, to build a turf playground outside the charity's early-education classrooms.

== Career statistics ==
=== Medals by tour ===
| Tour | Titles | Total medals | Career-high ranking |
|---|---|---|---|
| PPA Tour | 2 | 47 (2 gold, 16 silver, 29 bronze) | No. 2 (singles, mixed doubles); No. 5 (men's doubles) |
| APP Tour | 19 | 36 | No. 1 (singles, men's doubles, mixed doubles) |

=== PPA Tour year-end rankings ===
| Year | Men's singles | Men's doubles | Mixed doubles |
|---|---|---|---|
| 2021 | 4 | 8 | 4 |
| 2022 | 3 | 5 | 3 |
| 2023 | 7 | 13 | 11 |
| 2024 | 14 | 22 | 20 |
| 2025 | 20 | 12 | 13 |

=== Major finals ===
| Result | Year | Tournament | Event | Partner | Opponents | Score |
|---|---|---|---|---|---|---|
| Win | 2021 | PPA Championships, Las Vegas | Mixed doubles | Jessie Irvine | Lindsey Newman; Riley Newman | 11–13, 4–11, 11–5, 11–5, 11–6 |
| Loss | 2026 | US Open Pickleball Championships, Naples | Men's singles | — | Dusty Boyer | 4–11, 2–11 |
| Win | 2026 | US Open Pickleball Championships, Naples | Mixed doubles | Anna Leigh Waters | Casey Diamond; Sofia Sewing | 10–12, 11–2, 11–9 |

=== Titles ===
| Year | Tour | Tournament | Division(s) |
|---|---|---|---|
| 2020 | APP | Cincinnati Open | Men's singles, mixed doubles |
| 2020 | APP | Hilton Head | Men's singles, mixed doubles |
| 2021 | APP | Cincinnati Open | Men's singles |
| 2021 | APP | Indianapolis Open | Men's singles, men's doubles |
| 2021 | APP | Los Angeles Open | Men's singles, men's doubles |
| 2021 | APP | SoCal Classic Open | Men's singles, mixed doubles |
| 2021 | APP | Beer City Open | Men's doubles, mixed doubles |
| 2021 | APP | Pacific Northwest | Men's singles, men's doubles, mixed doubles |
| 2021 | APP | Chicago Open | Men's singles |
| 2021 | PPA | PPA Championships (Las Vegas) | Mixed doubles (with Jessie Irvine) |
| 2022 | APP | Mesa Open | Mixed doubles |
| 2022 | PPA | Selkirk Labs Showdown | Men's doubles (with Ben Johns) |
| 2024 | — | Monsoon Pickleball Championship 2.0 (Mumbai) | Men's doubles (with Quang Duong) |
| 2026 | — | US Open Pickleball Championships (Naples) | Mixed doubles (with Anna Leigh Waters) |
| 2026 | APP | Arizona Open (Mesa) | Mixed doubles (with Domenika Turkovic) |

2020–2022 titles are from Devilliers's official website.

== See also ==
- List of professional pickleball players
