= 2026 Australian Open =

Tennis championships

- Date: 18 January – 1 February 2026
- Edition: 114th Open Era (58th)
- Category: Grand Slam
- Draw: 128S / 64D
- Prize money: A$111,500,000
- Surface: Hard (GreenSet)
- Location: Melbourne, Victoria, Australia
- Venue: Melbourne Park

Champions

Men's singles
- (Spain) Carlos Alcaraz

Women's singles
- (Kazakhstan) Elena Rybakina

Men's doubles
- (United States) Christian Harrison / (United Kingdom) Neal Skupski

Women's doubles
- (Belgium) Elise Mertens / (China) Zhang Shuai

Mixed doubles
- (Australia) Olivia Gadecki / (Australia) John Peers

Wheelchair men's singles
- (Japan) Tokito Oda

Wheelchair women's singles
- (China) Li Xiaohui

Wheelchair quad singles
- (Netherlands) Niels Vink

Wheelchair men's doubles
- (Argentina) Gustavo Fernández / (Japan) Tokito Oda

Wheelchair women's doubles
- (China) Li Xiaohui / (China) Wang Ziying

Wheelchair quad doubles
- (Israel) Guy Sasson / (Netherlands) Niels Vink

Boys' singles
- (Slovenia) Žiga Šeško

Girls' singles
- (France) Ksenia Efremova

Boys' doubles
- (South Africa) Connor Doig / (Bulgaria) Dimitar Kisimov

Girls' doubles
- (Czech Republic) Alena Kovačková / (Czech Republic) Jana Kovačková

Wheelchair boys' singles
- (Belgium) Alexander Lantermann

Wheelchair girls' singles
- (Belgium) Luna Gryp

Wheelchair boys' doubles
- (United Kingdom) Lucas John De Gouveia / (Belgium) Alexander Lantermann

Wheelchair girls' doubles
- (United Kingdom) Lucy Foyster / (Japan) Seira Matsuoka
- Australian Open

The 2026 Australian Open was a Grand Slam level tennis tournament that was held at Melbourne Park, from 18 January to 1 February 2026, with the preliminary rounds played from 12 to 15 January. It was the 114th edition of the Australian Open, the 58th in the Open Era and the first major of the year. The tournament consisted of events for professional players in singles, doubles and mixed doubles. Junior and wheelchair players competed in singles and doubles tournaments.

The defending men's singles champion, Jannik Sinner, lost in the semifinals. The defending women's singles champion, Madison Keys, lost in the fourth round. Venus Williams became the oldest player to play in the women's singles draw at age 45.

Russian and Belarusian players were still required to participate as neutral athletes. Their national flags were not shown against their names and both flags were still banned from the tournament venue due to the ongoing war between Russia and Ukraine.

== Singles players ==
- Men's singles

Champion		Runner-up	
(Spain) Carlos Alcaraz [1]		(Serbia) Novak Djokovic [4]	
Semifinals out
(Germany) Alexander Zverev [3]		(Italy) Jannik Sinner [2]	
Quarterfinals out
(Australia) Alex de Minaur [6]	(United States) Learner Tien [25]	(Italy) Lorenzo Musetti [5]	(United States) Ben Shelton [8]
4th round out
(United States) Tommy Paul [19]	(Kazakhstan) Alexander Bublik [10]	(Argentina) Francisco Cerúndolo [18]	Daniil Medvedev [11]
(United States) Taylor Fritz [9]	(Czech Republic) Jakub Menšík [16]	(Norway) Casper Ruud [12]	(Italy) Luciano Darderi [22]
3rd round out
(France) Corentin Moutet [32]	(Spain) Alejandro Davidovich Fokina [14]	(Argentina) Tomás Martín Etcheverry	(United States) Frances Tiafoe [29]
(United Kingdom) Cameron Norrie [26]	Andrey Rublev [13]	(Hungary) Fábián Marozsán	(Portugal) Nuno Borges
(Czech Republic) Tomáš Macháč	(Switzerland) Stan Wawrinka (WC)	(United States) Ethan Quinn	(Netherlands) Botic van de Zandschulp
(Monaco) Valentin Vacherot [30]	(Croatia) Marin Čilić	Karen Khachanov [15]	(United States) Eliot Spizzirri
2nd round out
(Germany) Yannick Hanfmann	(United States) Michael Zheng (Q)	(Argentina) Thiago Agustín Tirante	(United States) Reilly Opelka
(Hungary) Márton Fucsovics	(United Kingdom) Arthur Fery (Q)	(Argentina) Francisco Comesaña	(Serbia) Hamad Medjedovic
(France) Alexandre Müller	(United States) Emilio Nava	(Bosnia and Herzegovina) Damir Džumhur	(Portugal) Jaime Faria (Q)
(France) Quentin Halys	(Poland) Kamil Majchrzak	(Kazakhstan) Alexander Shevchenko	(Australia) Jordan Thompson (WC)
(Italy) Lorenzo Sonego	(Greece) Stefanos Tsitsipas [31]	(France) Arthur Géa (Q)	(Czech Republic) Vít Kopřiva
(Spain) Rafael Jódar (Q)	(Poland) Hubert Hurkacz	(China) Shang Juncheng (PR)	(Italy) Francesco Maestrelli (Q)
(Australia) Dane Sweeny (Q)	(Australia) Rinky Hijikata (WC)	(Canada) Denis Shapovalov [21]	(Spain) Jaume Munar
(United States) Nishesh Basavareddy (Q)	(Argentina) Sebastián Báez	(China) Wu Yibing (Q)	(Australia) James Duckworth (WC)
1st round out
(Australia) Adam Walton	(United States) Zachary Svajda (Q)	(United States) Sebastian Korda	(Australia) Tristan Schoolkate
(United States) Aleksandar Kovacevic	(Australia) Aleksandar Vukic	(Norway) Nicolai Budkov Kjær (Q)	(Austria) Filip Misolic
(United States) Jenson Brooksby	(Argentina) Camilo Ugo Carabelli	(Serbia) Miomir Kecmanović	(Italy) Flavio Cobolli [20]
(Australia) Jason Kubler (Q)	(United States) Patrick Kypson (WC)	(Argentina) Mariano Navone	(United States) Mackenzie McDonald (LL)
(Canada) Gabriel Diallo	(Australia) Alexei Popyrin	(France) Kyrian Jacquet (WC)	(France) Benjamin Bonzi
(China) Zhang Zhizhen (PR)	(Canada) Liam Draxl (Q)	(Belgium) Alexander Blockx (LL)	(Italy) Matteo Arnaldi
(Netherlands) Jesper de Jong	(Chile) Alejandro Tabilo	(United Kingdom) Jacob Fearnley	(France) Arthur Rinderknech [24]
(United States) Marcos Giron	(Sweden) Elias Ymer (Q)	(Argentina) Juan Manuel Cerúndolo	(Canada) Félix Auger-Aliassime [7]
(Belgium) Raphaël Collignon	(Spain) Carlos Taberner	(Bulgaria) Grigor Dimitrov	(Japan) Shintaro Mochizuki
(Czech Republic) Jiří Lehečka [17]	(Serbia) Laslo Djere	(Germany) Jan-Lennard Struff	(France) Valentin Royer
(Spain) Pablo Carreño Busta	(Japan) Rei Sakamoto (Q)	(Belgium) Zizou Bergs	(Netherlands) Tallon Griekspoor [23]
(United States) Brandon Nakashima [27]	(Spain) Roberto Bautista Agut	(France) Térence Atmane	(Spain) Pedro Martínez
(France) Ugo Humbert	(France) Gaël Monfils	(France) Adrian Mannarino	(United States) Martin Damm (Q)
(China) Bu Yunchaokete (WC)	(Germany) Daniel Altmaier	(Czech Republic) Dalibor Svrčina	(Italy) Mattia Bellucci
(United States) Alex Michelsen	(Australia) Christopher O'Connell (WC)	(France) Giovanni Mpetshi Perricard	(Chile) Cristian Garín
(Brazil) João Fonseca [28]	(Italy) Luca Nardi	(Croatia) Dino Prižmić (LL)	(France) Hugo Gaston

- Women's singles

Champion		Runner-up	
(Kazakhstan) Elena Rybakina [5]		Aryna Sabalenka [1]	
Semifinals out
(Ukraine) Elina Svitolina [12]		(United States) Jessica Pegula [6]	
Quarterfinals out
(United States) Iva Jovic [29]	(United States) Coco Gauff [3]	(United States) Amanda Anisimova [4]	(Poland) Iga Świątek [2]
4th round out
(Canada) Victoria Mboko [17]	(Kazakhstan) Yulia Putintseva	(Czech Republic) Karolína Muchová [19]	Mirra Andreeva [8]
(United States) Madison Keys [9]	(China) Wang Xinyu	(Belgium) Elise Mertens [21]	(Australia) Maddison Inglis (Q)
3rd round out
(Austria) Anastasia Potapova	(Denmark) Clara Tauson [14]	(Turkey) Zeynep Sönmez (Q)	(Italy) Jasmine Paolini [7]
(United States) Hailey Baptiste	(Poland) Magda Linette	Diana Shnaider [23]	(Romania) Elena-Gabriela Ruse
Oksana Selekhmeteva	(Czech Republic) Karolína Plíšková (PR)	(Czech Republic) Linda Nosková [13]	(United States) Peyton Stearns
(Czech Republic) Tereza Valentová	(Czech Republic) Nikola Bartůňková (Q)	(Japan) Naomi Osaka [16]	Anna Kalinskaya [31]
2nd round out
(China) Bai Zhuoxuan (Q)	(United Kingdom) Emma Raducanu [28]	(United States) Caty McNally	(Uzbekistan) Polina Kudermetova
(Hungary) Anna Bondár	(France) Elsa Jacquemot	(Australia) Priscilla Hon (WC)	(Poland) Magdalena Fręch
(Serbia) Olga Danilović	(Australia) Storm Hunter (Q)	(United States) Alycia Parks	(United States) Ann Li
(Poland) Linda Klimovičová (Q)	(Australia) Talia Gibson (WC)	(Australia) Ajla Tomljanović	(Greece) Maria Sakkari
(United States) McCartney Kessler	(Spain) Paula Badosa [25]	(Indonesia) Janice Tjen	(United States) Ashlyn Krueger
(Australia) Taylah Preston (WC)	(Latvia) Jeļena Ostapenko [24]	(Croatia) Petra Marčinko	(Czech Republic) Kateřina Siniaková
(France) Varvara Gracheva	(Czech Republic) Linda Fruhvirtová (Q)	(Japan) Moyuka Uchijima	(Switzerland) Belinda Bencic [10]
(Romania) Sorana Cîrstea	(Germany) Laura Siegemund	(Austria) Julia Grabher	(Czech Republic) Marie Bouzková
1st round out
(France) Tiantsoa Rakotomanga Rajaonah (WC)	Anastasia Pavlyuchenkova	(Netherlands) Suzan Lamens	(Thailand) Mananchaya Sawangkaew (PR)
(Australia) Emerson Jones (WC)	(Japan) Himeno Sakatsume (Q)	(Spain) Guiomar Maristany (Q)	(Hungary) Dalma Gálfi
Ekaterina Alexandrova [11]	(United States) Elizabeth Mandlik (WC)	(Brazil) Beatriz Haddad Maia	(Ukraine) Marta Kostyuk [20]
(United States) Katie Volynets	(Canada) Marina Stakusic (Q)	(Slovenia) Veronika Erjavec	Aliaksandra Sasnovich (Q)
(Uzbekistan) Kamilla Rakhimova	(United States) Venus Williams (WC)	(Spain) Jéssica Bouzas Maneiro	(United States) Taylor Townsend (LL)
(Romania) Jaqueline Cristian	(Philippines) Alexandra Eala	(Colombia) Camila Osorio	(United States) Emma Navarro [15]
(Spain) Cristina Bucșa	(United Kingdom) Francesca Jones	Anna Blinkova	(Czech Republic) Barbora Krejčíková
(Ukraine) Dayana Yastremska [26]	(Ukraine) Yuliia Starodubtseva (Q)	(France) Léolia Jeanjean	(Croatia) Donna Vekić
Anastasia Zakharova	(Colombia) Emiliana Arango	(Germany) Ella Seidel	(Kazakhstan) Zarina Diyas (WC)
(Canada) Leylah Fernandez [22]	(United States) Sloane Stephens (Q)	(Czech Republic) Sára Bejlek	(Ukraine) Oleksandra Oliynykova
(Latvia) Darja Semeņistaja	(China) Zhang Shuai	(Ukraine) Anhelina Kalinina (Q)	(Slovakia) Rebecca Šramková
(United States) Sofia Kenin [27]	(Germany) Tatjana Maria	(Hungary) Panna Udvardy	(Switzerland) Simona Waltert
(Slovenia) Kaja Juvan	(Switzerland) Viktorija Golubic	(New Zealand) Lulu Sun	(Australia) Maya Joint [30]
(Thailand) Lanlana Tararudee (Q)	(Argentina) Solana Sierra	(Australia) Daria Kasatkina	(United Kingdom) Katie Boulter
(Croatia) Antonia Ružić	(Germany) Eva Lys	(Australia) Kimberly Birrell	Liudmila Samsonova [18]
(United Kingdom) Sonay Kartal	(Italy) Elisabetta Cocciaretto	(Mexico) Renata Zarazúa	(China) Yuan Yue (Q)

== Matches ==
=== Men's singles ===
- (Spain) Carlos Alcaraz def. (Serbia) Novak Djokovic, 2–6, 6–2, 6–3, 7–5

=== Women's singles ===
- (Kazakhstan) Elena Rybakina def. Aryna Sabalenka, 6–4, 4–6, 6–4

=== Men's doubles ===
- (United States) Christian Harrison / (United Kingdom) Neal Skupski def. (Australia) Jason Kubler / (Australia) Marc Polmans, 7–6^{(7–4)}, 6–4

=== Women's doubles ===
- (Belgium) Elise Mertens / (China) Zhang Shuai def. (Kazakhstan) Anna Danilina / (Serbia) Aleksandra Krunić, 7–6^{(7–4)}, 6–4

=== Mixed doubles ===
- (Australia) Olivia Gadecki / (Australia) John Peers def. (France) Kristina Mladenovic / (France) Manuel Guinard, 4–6, 6–3, [10–8]

=== Wheelchair men's singles ===
- (Japan) Tokito Oda def. (Spain) Martín de la Puente, 3–6, 6–2, 6–2

=== Wheelchair women's singles ===
- (China) Li Xiaohui def. (Netherlands) Diede de Groot, 6–1, 6–2

=== Wheelchair quad singles ===
- (Netherlands) Niels Vink def. (Netherlands) Sam Schröder, 6–3, 7–6^{(7–5)}

=== Wheelchair men's doubles ===
- (Argentina) Gustavo Fernández / (Japan) Tokito Oda def. (Spain) Daniel Caverzaschi / (Netherlands) Ruben Spaargaren, 6–2, 6–1

=== Wheelchair women's doubles ===
- (China) Li Xiaohui / (China) Wang Ziying def. (Japan) Yui Kamiji / (China) Zhu Zhenzhen, 6–4, 6–3

=== Wheelchair quad doubles ===
- (Israel) Guy Sasson / (Netherlands) Niels Vink def. (Australia) Heath Davidson / (United Kingdom) Andy Lapthorne, 6–3, 6–1

=== Boys' singles ===
- (Slovenia) Žiga Šeško def. (United States) Keaton Hance, 4–6, 6–3, 6–4

=== Girls' singles ===
- (France) Ksenia Efremova def. Ekaterina Tupitsyna, 6–3, 7–5

=== Boys' doubles ===
- (South Africa) Connor Doig / (Bulgaria) Dimitar Kisimov def. (Australia) Ymerali Ibraimi / (Australia) Cooper Kose, 6–3, 6–4

=== Girls' doubles ===
- (Czech Republic) Alena Kovačková / (Czech Republic) Jana Kovačková def. (Czech Republic) Tereza Heřmanová / (Czech Republic) Denisa Žoldáková, 6–1, 6–3

=== Wheelchair boys' singles ===
- (Belgium) Alexander Lantermann def. (United Kingdom) Matthew Knoesen, 6–0, 6–2

=== Wheelchair girls' singles ===
- (Belgium) Luna Gryp def. (Japan) Seira Matsuoka, 6–4, 6–4

=== Wheelchair boys' doubles ===
- (United Kingdom) Lucas John De Gouveia / (Belgium) Alexander Lantermann def. (United Kingdom) Matthew Knoesen / (Australia) Arlo Shawcross, 6–2, 6–3

=== Wheelchair girls' doubles ===
- (United Kingdom) Lucy Foyster / (Japan) Seira Matsuoka def. (Belgium) Luna Gryp / (United States) Lucy Heald, 6–3, 7–5

== Points and prize money ==
=== Point distribution ===
Below is a series of tables for each competition showing the ranking points offered for each event.

==== Senior points ====
Event	W	F	SF	QF	Round of 16	Round of 32	Round of 64	Round of 128	Q	Q3	Q2	Q1
Men's singles	2000	1300	800	400	200	100	50	10	30	16	8	0
Men's doubles	2000	1200	720	360	180	90	0	N/A				
Women's singles	2000	1300	780	430	240	130	70	10	40	30	20	2
Women's doubles	2000	1300	780	430	240	130	10	N/A				

==== Wheelchair points ====
Event	W	F	SF	QF	Round of 16
Singles	1200	780	480	240	120
Doubles	1200	780	480	240	N/A
Quad singles	1200	780	480	240	120
Quad doubles	1200	780	480	240	N/A

==== Junior points ====
Event	W	F	SF	QF	Round of 16	Round of 32	Q	Q3
Boys' singles	1000	700	490	300	180	90	25	20
Girls' singles	1000	700	490	300	180	90	25	20
Boys' doubles	750	525	367	225	135	N/A		
Girls' doubles	750	525	367	225	135	N/A		

=== Prize money ===
The Australian Open total prize money for 2026 increased by 16% year on year to a tournament record A$111,500,000.

Event	W	F	SF	QF	Round of 16	Round of 32	Round of 64	Round of 128	Q3	Q2	Q1
Singles	A$4,150,000	A$2,150,000	A$1,250,000	A$750,000	A$480,000	A$327,750	A$225,000	A$150,000	A$83,500	A$57,000	A$40,500
Doubles	A$900,000	A$485,000	A$275,000	A$158,000	A$92,000	A$64,000	A$44,000	N/A			

== Exhibition events ==
=== 1 Point Slam ===
The 2026 1 Point Slam was held on 14 January, with significantly increased prize money for the champion. Amateur tennis player Jordan Smith defeated Joanna Garland in the final, winning a $1 million prize, along with $50,000 in funding for his tennis club. (Alec Reverente defeated Smith in a bonus round to win a Kia EV3.)

The list of professional players who participated in this edition included Jannik Sinner, Iga Świątek, Maria Sakkari, Nick Kyrgios, Amanda Anisimova, Carlos Alcaraz, Coco Gauff, Laura Pigossi and others.

=== AO Pickleball Slam ===
The AO Pickleball Slam is scheduled to return for its second edition.

=== Charity matches ===
On 13 January, Alexander Zverev and Lorenzo Musetti played an exhibition match, with the latter retiring injured while trailing 6–7^{(7–9)}. Two days later, Carlos Alcaraz played Alex de Minaur, with the Spaniard triumphing 6–3, 6–4.

In the women's exhibitions, McCartney Kessler defeated Amanda Anisimova 6–3, 3–6, [10–7]. Anisimova played Elina Svitolina in a subsequent match.

Jannik Sinner defeated Félix Auger-Aliassime 6–4, 4–6, [10–4] in the final charity match.

=== Red Bull Bassline ===
The Red Bull Bassline was an event characterized by a non-traditional format that combined short tie-break matches with live music played by a DJ. Matches were conducted without official umpires, with players responsible for making line calls and resolving points on court. Audience participation was encouraged, including involvement in disputed calls.

Matches were played in a rapid best-of-three format, with each set consisting of a tie-break to five points. Six players participated, divided into two groups, usually identified as Red and Blue. Within each group, the competition followed a round-robin structure, with each player facing all other players in the same group. Music was played throughout the matches, and spectators were invited to engage through voting and audible support, contributing to the event’s informal presentation.

Nicolai Budkov Kjaer was the winner.

=== Mixed doubles showdown ===
A mixed doubles tournament where matches were timed at 10 minutes with a 15-second shot clock, and the serve order followed a 1–2–2–2 sequence, as in a tiebreak. The team with the most points at the end of the match was declared the winner. At the conclusion of the group stage, the team with the highest number of points in each group advanced to the final. In the event of a tie, a golden point was to be played to determine the winner. All other rules applicable to Grand Slam mixed doubles tennis would apply unless otherwise specified.

The final was played by Australians Ellen Perez and Nick Kyrgios against Brazilian Luisa Stefani and Salvadoran Marcelo Arevalo. Perez and Kyrgios were the winners with a score of 10/9.

== Opening ceremony ==
Roger Federer, Lleyton Hewitt, Pat Rafter and Andre Agassi (later subbed off for Ash Barty) participated in a Fast4 exhibition doubles match to commemorate the Australian Open's first ever opening ceremony.

Preceded by 2025 Australian Open	Australian Open	Succeeded by 2027 Australian Open
Preceded by 2025 US Open	Grand Slams	Succeeded by 2026 French Open
