= Alshon =

Alshon may refer to:

- Alshon Jeffery (born 1990), a former professional American football player
- Christian Alshon (born 2000), a professional American pickleball player
