= 2025 Australian Open =

Tennis championships

- Date: 12 – 26 January 2025
- Edition: 113th Open Era (57th)
- Category: Grand Slam
- Draw: 128S / 64D
- Prize money: A$96,500,000
- Surface: Hard (GreenSet)
- Location: Melbourne, Victoria, Australia
- Venue: Melbourne Park
- Attendance: 1,218,831

Champions

Men's singles
- (Italy) Jannik Sinner

Women's singles
- (United States) Madison Keys

Men's doubles
- (Finland) Harri Heliövaara / (United Kingdom) Henry Patten

Women's doubles
- (Czech Republic) Kateřina Siniaková / (United States) Taylor Townsend

Mixed doubles
- (Australia) Olivia Gadecki / (Australia) John Peers

Wheelchair men's singles
- (United Kingdom) Alfie Hewett

Wheelchair women's singles
- (Japan) Yui Kamiji

Wheelchair quad singles
- (Netherlands) Sam Schröder

Wheelchair men's doubles
- (United Kingdom) Alfie Hewett / (United Kingdom) Gordon Reid

Wheelchair women's doubles
- (China) Li Xiaohui / (China) Wang Ziying

Wheelchair quad doubles
- (United Kingdom) Andy Lapthorne / (Netherlands) Sam Schröder

Boys' singles
- (Switzerland) Henry Bernet

Girls' singles
- (Japan) Wakana Sonobe

Boys' doubles
- (United States) Maxwell Exsted / (Czech Republic) Jan Kumstát

Girls' doubles
- (United States) Annika Penickova / (United States) Kristina Penickova

Wheelchair boys' singles
- (United States) Charlie Cooper

Wheelchair girls' singles
- (Brazil) Vitória Miranda

Wheelchair boys' doubles
- (Brazil) Luiz Calixto / (United States) Charlie Cooper

Wheelchair girls' doubles
- (Belgium) Luna Gryp / (Brazil) Vitória Miranda
- Australian Open

The 2025 Australian Open was a Grand Slam level tennis tournament held at Melbourne Park from 12 to 26 January 2025. It was the 113th edition of the Australian Open, the 57th in the Open Era, and the first major of the year. The tournament consisted of events for professional players in singles, doubles and mixed doubles. Junior and wheelchair players competed in singles and doubles tournaments.

Jannik Sinner defeated Alexander Zverev and successfully defended the men's singles title. Madison Keys won the women's singles champion, after defeating two-time defending champion Aryna Sabalenka in the final.

The 2025 Australian Open became the first Australian Open to present pickleball. From January 24 to the 26th the AO Pickleball Slam tournament was held. Over A$100,000 in prize money was awarded to some of Australia's top professional pickleball players.

Additionally, the inaugural 1 Point Slam was held, in which Omar Jasika defeated Priscilla Hon in the final for a total of $60,000 in prize money.

== Singles players ==
- Men's singles

Champion		Runner-up	
(Italy) Jannik Sinner [1]		(Germany) Alexander Zverev [2]	
Semifinals out
(United States) Ben Shelton [21]		(Serbia) Novak Djokovic [7]	
Quarterfinals out
(Australia) Alex de Minaur [8]	(Italy) Lorenzo Sonego	(Spain) Carlos Alcaraz [3]	(United States) Tommy Paul [12]
4th round out
(Denmark) Holger Rune [13]	(United States) Alex Michelsen	(France) Gaël Monfils	(United States) Learner Tien (Q)
(Czech Republic) Jiří Lehečka [24]	(United Kingdom) Jack Draper [15]	(Spain) Alejandro Davidovich Fokina	(France) Ugo Humbert [14]
3rd round out
(United States) Marcos Giron	(Serbia) Miomir Kecmanović	Karen Khachanov [19]	(Argentina) Francisco Cerúndolo [31]
(United States) Taylor Fritz [4]	(Italy) Lorenzo Musetti [16]	(Hungary) Fábián Marozsán	(France) Corentin Moutet
(Czech Republic) Tomáš Macháč [26]	(France) Benjamin Bonzi	(Australia) Aleksandar Vukic	(Portugal) Nuno Borges
(Czech Republic) Jakub Menšík	(Spain) Roberto Carballés Baena	(France) Arthur Fils [20]	(United Kingdom) Jacob Fearnley
2nd round out
(Australia) Tristan Schoolkate (WC)	(Argentina) Tomás Martín Etcheverry	(Poland) Hubert Hurkacz [18]	(Italy) Matteo Berrettini
(Australia) James McCabe (WC)	(Canada) Gabriel Diallo	(Argentina) Facundo Díaz Acosta	(United States) Tristan Boyer (Q)
(Chile) Cristian Garín (Q)	(Germany) Daniel Altmaier	(Spain) Pablo Carreño Busta (PR)	(Canada) Denis Shapovalov
(Brazil) João Fonseca (Q)	(United States) Frances Tiafoe [17]	(United States) Mitchell Krueger (Q)	Daniil Medvedev [5]
(Portugal) Jaime Faria (Q)	(United States) Reilly Opelka (PR)	(France) Hugo Gaston	(Italy) Francesco Passaro (LL)
(Australia) Thanasi Kokkinakis	(United States) Sebastian Korda [22]	(Australia) Jordan Thompson [27]	(Japan) Yoshihito Nishioka
(Norway) Casper Ruud [6]	(Canada) Félix Auger-Aliassime [29]	(Australia) James Duckworth	(Japan) Kei Nishikori (PR)
(Lebanon) Hady Habib (Q)	(France) Quentin Halys	(France) Arthur Cazaux	(Spain) Pedro Martínez
1st round out
(Chile) Nicolás Jarry	(Japan) Taro Daniel	(Germany) Yannick Hanfmann	(Italy) Flavio Cobolli [32]
(Netherlands) Tallon Griekspoor	(Serbia) Dušan Lajović	(United Kingdom) Cameron Norrie	(China) Zhang Zhizhen
(Greece) Stefanos Tsitsipas [11]	(Spain) Martín Landaluce (Q)	(Italy) Luca Nardi	(France) Adrian Mannarino
(Kazakhstan) Alexander Bublik	(Belgium) Zizou Bergs	(Argentina) Federico Coria	(Netherlands) Botic van de Zandschulp
(United States) Jenson Brooksby (PR)	(Croatia) Borna Ćorić	(Argentina) Francisco Comesaña	(France) Giovanni Mpetshi Perricard [30]
(United States) Brandon Nakashima	(Poland) Kamil Majchrzak (Q)	(Spain) Roberto Bautista Agut	(Italy) Matteo Arnaldi
Andrey Rublev [9]	(Switzerland) Stan Wawrinka (WC)	(Brazil) Thiago Seyboth Wild	(France) Arthur Rinderknech
(Australia) Alexei Popyrin [25]	(Australia) Rinky Hijikata	(Argentina) Camilo Ugo Carabelli	(Thailand) Kasidit Samrej (WC)
(United States) Nishesh Basavareddy (WC)	Pavel Kotov	(Belgium) Gauthier Onclin (Q)	(India) Sumit Nagal
(Australia) Li Tu (WC)	(Australia) Omar Jasika (WC)	(Belgium) David Goffin	(Bulgaria) Grigor Dimitrov [10]
(Argentina) Mariano Navone	Roman Safiullin	(Bosnia and Herzegovina) Damir Džumhur	(Slovakia) Lukáš Klein (Q)
(Germany) Dominik Koepfer (Q)	(France) Alexandre Müller	(Tunisia) Aziz Dougaz (Q)	(Kazakhstan) Alexander Shevchenko
(Spain) Jaume Munar	(Georgia (country)) Nikoloz Basilashvili (Q)	(China) Shang Juncheng	(Germany) Jan-Lennard Struff
(Chile) Alejandro Tabilo [23]	(Switzerland) Dominic Stricker (PR)	(Brazil) Thiago Monteiro (Q)	(Australia) Christopher O'Connell
(Italy) Matteo Gigante (Q)	(China) Bu Yunchaokete	(Australia) Adam Walton	(Finland) Otto Virtanen
(Argentina) Sebastián Báez [28]	(Australia) Nick Kyrgios (PR)	(Italy) Luciano Darderi	(France) Lucas Pouille (WC)

- Women's singles

Champion		Runner-up	
(United States) Madison Keys [19]		Aryna Sabalenka [1]	
Semifinals out
(Spain) Paula Badosa [11]		(Poland) Iga Świątek [2]	
Quarterfinals out
Anastasia Pavlyuchenkova [27]	(United States) Coco Gauff [3]	(Ukraine) Elina Svitolina [28]	(United States) Emma Navarro [8]
4th round out
Mirra Andreeva [14]	(Croatia) Donna Vekić [18]	(Switzerland) Belinda Bencic (PR)	(Serbia) Olga Danilović
(Kazakhstan) Elena Rybakina [6]	Veronika Kudermetova	Daria Kasatkina [9]	(Germany) Eva Lys (LL)
3rd round out
(Denmark) Clara Tauson	(Poland) Magdalena Fręch [23]	Diana Shnaider [12]	(Germany) Laura Siegemund
(Canada) Leylah Fernandez [30]	(Japan) Naomi Osaka	(Ukraine) Marta Kostyuk [17]	(United States) Jessica Pegula [7]
(Ukraine) Dayana Yastremska [32]	(United States) Danielle Collins [10]	(Brazil) Beatriz Haddad Maia [15]	(Italy) Jasmine Paolini [4]
(Tunisia) Ons Jabeur	(Kazakhstan) Yulia Putintseva [24]	(Romania) Jaqueline Cristian	(United Kingdom) Emma Raducanu
2nd round out
(Spain) Jéssica Bouzas Maneiro	(Germany) Tatjana Maria	Anna Blinkova	(Japan) Moyuka Uchijima
(Australia) Ajla Tomljanović (WC)	(United Kingdom) Harriet Dart (LL)	Anastasia Potapova	(China) Zheng Qinwen [5]
(United Kingdom) Jodie Burrage (PR)	(Spain) Cristina Bucșa	(Czech Republic) Karolína Muchová [20]	(Netherlands) Suzan Lamens
(Australia) Talia Gibson (WC)	(Germany) Jule Niemeier	Liudmila Samsonova [25]	(Belgium) Elise Mertens
(United States) Iva Jovic (WC)	(Montenegro) Danka Kovinić (PR)	(Romania) Elena-Gabriela Ruse (Q)	(Australia) Destanee Aiava (Q)
Erika Andreeva	(United Kingdom) Katie Boulter [22]	(United States) Caroline Dolehide	(Mexico) Renata Zarazúa
(China) Wang Xiyu	(Colombia) Camila Osorio	(China) Zhang Shuai (WC)	(China) Wang Yafan
(France) Varvara Gracheva	(Italy) Lucia Bronzetti	(United States) Amanda Anisimova	(Slovakia) Rebecca Šramková
1st round out
(United States) Sloane Stephens	(United Kingdom) Sonay Kartal	(United States) Bernarda Pera	(Czech Republic) Linda Nosková [29]
Polina Kudermetova (Q)	(Australia) Daria Saville (WC)	(Poland) Magda Linette	(Czech Republic) Marie Bouzková
(Italy) Elisabetta Cocciaretto	(United States) Ashlyn Krueger	(Croatia) Jana Fett (Q)	(France) Diane Parry
(China) Yuan Yue	(Slovenia) Tamara Zidanšek (Q)	(United States) Hailey Baptiste	(Romania) Anca Todoni (Q)
(United States) Sofia Kenin	(France) Léolia Jeanjean (Q)	(France) Chloé Paquet (WC)	(Ukraine) Yuliia Starodubtseva
(Argentina) Nadia Podoroska	(France) Caroline Garcia	(Slovenia) Veronika Erjavec (Q)	(Latvia) Jeļena Ostapenko [16]
(China) Wang Xinyu	(Turkey) Zeynep Sönmez	(Poland) Maja Chwalińska (Q)	(Japan) Nao Hibino (Q)
Kamilla Rakhimova	(Netherlands) Arantxa Rus	(Switzerland) Viktorija Golubic (Q)	(Australia) Maya Joint (WC)
(Australia) Emerson Jones (WC)	(Spain) Nuria Párrizas Díaz	(New Zealand) Lulu Sun	(Egypt) Mayar Sherif
(United States) Ann Li	(Romania) Irina-Camelia Begu	(Belgium) Greet Minnen	(Ukraine) Daria Snigur (Q)
(Argentina) Julia Riera (Q)	(China) Zheng Saisai (PR)	(Australia) Olivia Gadecki	(Canada) Rebecca Marino
(Romania) Sorana Cîrstea	(Czech Republic) Sára Bejlek (Q)	(United States) Taylor Townsend	(China) Wei Sijia (Q)
(United States) Peyton Stearns	(Austria) Julia Grabher (PR)	(Ukraine) Anhelina Kalinina	(Greece) Maria Sakkari [31]
(Armenia) Elina Avanesyan	(United States) McCartney Kessler	(Hungary) Anna Bondár	(Bulgaria) Viktoriya Tomova
(Australia) Kimberly Birrell (Q)	(United States) Caty McNally (PR)	(Croatia) Petra Martić (LL)	Victoria Azarenka [21]
Ekaterina Alexandrova [26]	(Argentina) María Lourdes Carlé	(United States) Katie Volynets	(Czech Republic) Kateřina Siniaková

== Matches ==
=== Men's singles ===
- (Italy) Jannik Sinner def. (Germany) Alexander Zverev, 6–3, 7–6^{(7–4)}, 6–3

=== Women's singles ===
- (United States) Madison Keys def. Aryna Sabalenka, 6–3, 2–6, 7–5

=== Men's doubles ===
- (Finland) Harri Heliövaara / (United Kingdom) Henry Patten def. (Italy) Simone Bolelli / (Italy) Andrea Vavassori, 6–7^{(16–18)}, 7–6^{(7–5)}, 6–3

=== Women's doubles ===
- (Czech Republic) Kateřina Siniaková / (United States) Taylor Townsend def. (Chinese Taipei) Hsieh Su-wei / (Latvia) Jeļena Ostapenko, 6–2, 6–7^{(4–7)}, 6–3

=== Mixed doubles ===
- (Australia) Olivia Gadecki / (Australia) John Peers def. (Australia) Kimberly Birrell / (Australia) John-Patrick Smith, 3–6, 6–4, [10–6]

=== Wheelchair men's singles ===
- (United Kingdom) Alfie Hewett def. (Japan) Tokito Oda, 6–4, 6–4

=== Wheelchair women's singles ===
- (Japan) Yui Kamiji def. (Netherlands) Aniek van Koot, 6–2, 6–2

=== Wheelchair quad singles ===
- (Netherlands) Sam Schröder def. (Netherlands) Niels Vink, 7–6^{(9–7)}, 7–5

=== Wheelchair men's doubles ===
- (United Kingdom) Alfie Hewett / (United Kingdom) Gordon Reid def. (Spain) Daniel Caverzaschi / (France) Stéphane Houdet, 6–2, 6–4

=== Wheelchair women's doubles ===
- (China) Li Xiaohui / (China) Wang Ziying def. (Japan) Manami Tanaka / (China) Zhu Zhenzhen, 6–2, 6–3

=== Wheelchair quad doubles ===
- (United Kingdom) Andy Lapthorne / (Netherlands) Sam Schröder def. (Israel) Guy Sasson / (Netherlands) Niels Vink, 6–1, 6–4

=== Boys' singles ===
- (Switzerland) Henry Bernet def. (United States) Benjamin Willwerth, 6–3, 6–4

=== Girls' singles ===
- (Japan) Wakana Sonobe def. (United States) Kristina Penickova, 6–0, 6–1

=== Boys' doubles ===
- (United States) Maxwell Exsted / (Czech Republic) Jan Kumstát def. (Serbia) Ognjen Milić / Egor Pleshivtsev, 7–6^{(8–6)}, 6–3

=== Girls' doubles ===
- (United States) Annika Penickova / (United States) Kristina Penickova def. (Australia) Emerson Jones / (United Kingdom) Hannah Klugman, 6–4, 6–2

=== Wheelchair boys' singles ===
- (United States) Charlie Cooper def. (Belgium) Alexander Lantermann, 6–2, 6–2

=== Wheelchair girls' singles ===
- (Brazil) Vitória Miranda def. (United States) Sabina Czauz, 0–6, 6–3, 7–6^{(10–4)}

=== Wheelchair boys' doubles ===
- (Brazil) Luiz Calixto / (United States) Charlie Cooper def. (Belgium) Alexander Lantermann / (Australia) Benjamin Wenzel, 6–3, 6–0

=== Wheelchair girls' doubles ===
- (Belgium) Luna Gryp / (Brazil) Vitória Miranda def. (United States) Sabina Czauz / (Latvia) Ailina Mosko, 6–1, 6–1

== Points and prize money ==
=== Point distribution ===
Below is a series of tables for each competition showing the ranking points offered for each event.

==== Senior points ====
Event	W	F	SF	QF	Round of 16	Round of 32	Round of 64	Round of 128	Q	Q3	Q2	Q1
Men's singles	2000	1300	800	400	200	100	50	10	30	16	8	0
Men's doubles	2000	1200	720	360	180	90	0	N/A				
Women's singles	2000	1300	780	430	240	130	70	10	40	30	20	2
Women's doubles	2000	1300	780	430	240	130	10	N/A				

==== Wheelchair points ====
Event	W	F	SF	QF	Round of 16
Singles	800	500	375	200	100
Doubles	800	500	375	100	N/A
Quad singles	800	500	375	200	100
Quad doubles	800	500	375	100	N/A

==== Junior points ====
Event	W	F	SF	QF	Round of 16	Round of 32	Q	Q3
Boys' singles	1000	700	490	300	180	90	25	20
Girls' singles	1000	700	490	300	180	90	25	20
Boys' doubles	750	525	367	225	135	N/A		
Girls' doubles	750	525	367	225	135	N/A		

=== Prize money ===
The Australian Open total prize money for 2025 increased by 11.6% year on year to a tournament record A$96,500,000.

First-round main draw singles players received A$132,000, reflecting a 10% increase compared to 2024. The biggest percentage increase occurred in the third round of the singles draw, where prize money rose by 13.7% to A$290,000. Over the past decade, the total prize pool has increased by 119.3%, from the A$44 million offered in 2016.

Event	W	F	SF	QF	Round of 16	Round of 32	Round of 64	Round of 128	Q3	Q2	Q1
Singles	A$3,500,000	A$1,900,000	A$1,100,000	A$665,000	A$420,000	A$290,000	A$200,000	A$132,000	A$72,000	A$49,000	A$35,000
Doubles	A$810,000	A$440,000	A$250,000	A$142,000	A$82,000	A$58,000	A$40,000	N/A			
Mixed doubles	A$175,000	A$97,750	A$52,500	A$27,750	A$14,000	A$7,250	N/A				
Wheelchair singles	A$	A$	A$	A$	N/A						
Wheelchair doubles	A$	A$	A$	N/A	N/A						
Quad singles	A$	A$	A$	N/A	N/A						
Quad doubles	A$	A$	N/A	N/A	N/A						

== Court-side coaching ==
The Australian Open has introduced court-side "coaching pods" at this year's tournament (2025) in a Grand Slam first. The pods are positioned in two corners on each of the major courts with up to four people allowed, similar to the set-up at team events like the Davis Cup and United Cup.

They have access to real-time data on screens for statistical analysis, there is also a cooling mechanism for comfort. Coaches have the option to sit in the pods or in their usual place in the traditional player box, where friends and family can also sit.

Commenting on the courtside pods, Craig Tiley (CEO of Tennis Australia) said: “I’ve been an advocate for the coach being allowed on the court, just simply because it adds to the whole story, and the whole show, and every other sport has it.”

The change was expected to add greater narrative interest, give the coaches a more prominent role, and potentially lead to notable developments in the program.

== Media controversies ==
During a Nine News Melbourne broadcast on 17 January, Channel 9 presenter Tony Jones was standing in front of a crowd of Serbian fans when he said Djokovic was "overrated" and a "has-been", followed by "kick him out". Djokovic demanded an apology from Channel 9 and boycotted Jim Courier's on-court interview after defeating Jiří Lehečka in the fourth round, describing the comments as "insulting and offensive". Jones and the Nine Network issued an apology on Monday, with Jones claiming he already privately apologised to Djokovic's team on Saturday.

On 22 January, during a press conference after winning his quarterfinal match, Ben Shelton criticised the "negativity" and style of questions being asked by interviewers after matches in the on-court interviews. He said the interview of Learner Tien, after his defeat of Daniil Medvedev, was "embarrassing and disrespectful", and also criticised two questions asked towards himself by on-court interviewers. Current and former tennis players, including Chris Evert, Boris Becker, and Lehečka, supported Shelton's comments.

== Exhibition events ==
=== AO 1 Point Slam ===
The inaugural AO 1 Point Slam was held, in which Omar Jasika defeated Priscilla Hon in the final for a total of $60,000 in prize money.

=== AO Pickleball Slam ===
The AO Pickleball Slam is scheduled to return for its first edition.

Preceded by 2024 Australian Open	Australian Open	Succeeded by 2026 Australian Open
Preceded by 2024 US Open	Grand Slams	Succeeded by 2025 French Open
