= Zane Navratil =

American professional pickleball player

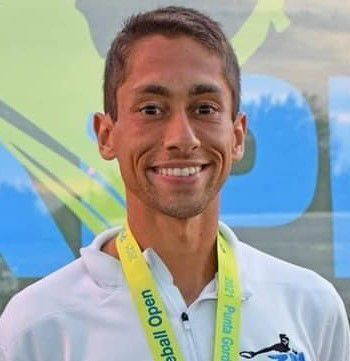
- Navratil at the 2021 Punta Gorda Open
- Country (sports): United States
- Residence: Austin, Texas, U.S.
- Born: November 2, 1995 (age 30)
- Height: 5 ft 9 in (175 cm)
- Turned pro: 2020
- Plays: Right-handed

Zane Denis Navratil (born November 2, 1995) is an American professional pickleball player. He competes on the Professional Pickleball Association Tour and reached world No. 1 in singles in 2021.[9] In 2025, he was elected president of the UPA Pro Player Committee.[3]

== Personal life ==
Navratil was born and raised in Racine, Wisconsin. He attended The Prairie School in Racine, where he won three state tennis championships in high school. He went on to play collegiate tennis at the University of Wisconsin–Whitewater, where he studied accounting. After graduating, Navratil worked as an auditor for Deloitte & Touche LLP in Milwaukee before quitting in 2020 to pursue professional pickleball full time. He later relocated to Austin, Texas with his longtime girlfriend, Jenny. The couple married in the spring of 2024, and are owners of two dogs, Murray and Arlo.

== Pickleball career ==
Navratil grew up playing multiple sports, including tennis, which he began training for seriously at age 12. He competed for The Prairie School in Racine, where he won three Wisconsin state championships. Navratil was introduced to pickleball during the winter of 2013–2014 when his father brought him to play at the Cesar Chavez Community Center in Racine. He later recalled being surprised by the level of skill in the sport and credited early matches against experienced local players with motivating him to improve. After several years competing in tournaments as an amateur, Navratil turned professional in 2020, leaving his position at Deloitte & Touche LLP to pursue pickleball full time. He rose quickly through the professional ranks and has reached as high as No. 1 in singles.

Navratil competes on the PPA Tour, where he consistently ranks among the top 25 in men's and mixed doubles. He has won numerous medals throughout his professional career, including four Major League Pickleball titles.

In 2025, he began competing internationally at the inaugural Australia Pickleball Open in Melbourne. Later that year he competed on the PPA Tour Asia circuit. At the MB Vietnam Cup in Da Nang, he and partner Armaan Bhatia reached the men's doubles semifinals after defeating the top-seeded team of Ben Johns and Dekel Bar. Navratil went on to win the silver medal in men's doubles and the bronze medal in mixed doubles. At the Malaysia Cup, Navratil and Bhatia also earned the bronze medal in men's doubles.

Navratil has partnered with several pickleball sponsors throughout his career. He joined ProXR Pickleball as a sponsored athlete in 2022. He teaches pickleball clinics around the country and is a featured instructor with Pickleball Pros. He has also released an online pickleball training academy.

Navratil is known for his analytical approach to the professional game and for his leadership role as President of the UPA Pro Player Committee, a newly formed body intended to represent the collective interests of professional players within the sport. He also produces pickleball-related media content, including hosting The PicklePod and the Zane Navratil Pickleball YouTube channel offering professional pickleball insights, entertainment and instruction.

== Playing Style ==
Navratil is known for his quickness and agility on the court. His playing style has been described as an aggressive, high-pressure approach that emphasizes footwork, court positioning, and a spin-heavy serve used to control rallies and dictate points.

== See also ==
- Pickleball
- PPA Tour
- Major League Pickleball
