= Pickleball Hall of Fame =

American honorary organization

Pickleball Hall of Fame (PHOF)
- Established: 2017
- Location: To be announced soon. See pickleballhalloffame.com for further information.
- Type: Professional sports hall of fame
- Founder: Seymour Rifkind
- President: John Gullo
- CEO: Natalie Summers
- Employees: Johnny Gullo - CFO
- Website: https://pickleballhalloffame.com/

The Pickleball Hall of Fame (PHOF) was established to provide worldwide recognition to individuals who have made significant contributions to, or achievements in, the sport of pickleball. Individuals may be recognized as competitors, contributors or both. This includes competitors who have achieved exceptional results in their pickleball careers and other individuals who have made exceptional contributions to the growth, development and leadership of the game.

For competitors to be considered they must have dominated competition for at least a five-year period while playing at the highest level. Contributors are those who, over a 5-year period, have made significant national or international contributions to the sport. The organization currently strives to induct about 4 new members each year.

== History ==
The PHOF was established by Seymour Rifkind in 2017. The original sponsors of the PHOF were the International Pickleball Teaching Professionals Association (IPTPA), USA Pickleball, Pickleball Central, Pickleball Magazine, and Pickleball Channel. The first induction ceremony took place in Casa Grande, Arizona on November 10, 2017, and honored six inaugural Pickleball Hall of Famers: Barney McCallum, Joel Pritchard, Arlen Paranto, Sid Williams, Billy Jacobsen, and Mark Friedenberg.

In February and March 2021 Seymour Rifkind, at the age of 70, rode his bicycle over 3000 miles, from San Diego, California to St. Augustine, Florida, to bring attention to the sport of pickleball, and raise funds for the Pickleball Hall of Fame.

In September 2021 USA Pickleball, the de facto governing body for pickleball in the United States, established its own hall of fame named the USA Pickleball Hall of Fame and Museum. In March 2023, after significant pushback from the pickleball community, USA Pickleball reached an agreement with the original PHOF for there to be only one independent not-for-profit organization.

== Museum ==
When the PHOF was first established, a collection of pickleball related historic materials were stored in a warehouse, operated by PickleballCentral, in Kent, Washington. In 2020 Seymour Rifkind announced that a permanent home for a pickleball museum would be built in Austin, Texas at the Austin Pickle Ranch. The following year Rifkind made his cross-country bike ride to raise funds for the new facility. Plans have since changed, and as of 2025, the PHOF is seeking to negotiate an agreement for a new, permanent home for the Pickleball Hall of Fame Museum.

== Inductees ==
=== Inductees by national origin ===
Native Country	PHOF Inductees
United States	25
Canada	3
Belgium	1
Brazil	1
Cambodia	1
Czechoslovakia	1
Mexico	1
South Korea	1

=== List of inductees ===
Name	Inducted	Type	Native Country	Hometown	Contribution
Bill Bell	2020	Contributor	United States	Van Wert, OH	One of the three creators of the game, and a "passionate" promotor of the sport. Acted as the first ambassador for Pickle ball, Inc.
Keith Bisel	2021	Contributor	United States	Bradford, PA	Known as "The Pied Piper of Pickleball". For over 28 years introduced pickleball to thousands of people at RV resorts. One-time USAPA National Champion. The original Pickleball Ambassador.
Bill Booth	2023	Contributor	Canada	Windsor, ON	Six-year member of the USA Pickleball Board of Directors. Created the USAPA online store for pickleball products and the initial software used by USAPA to manage memberships, rankings, places to play and tournaments. Was instrumental in developing the first portable pickleball net and the first USA Pickleball Rulebook.
Mona Burnett	2023	Competitor	Canada	Calgary, Alberta	Dominant player from 2009 to 2019. A sixteen-time USAP National Champion. Won 150 medals in her career, including 75 gold medals.
Norm Davis	2022	Contributor	United States	Pontiac, MI	Original member of USAPA Board. Instrumental in promoting pickleball in public schools, initiating the USAPA Grant Program and establishing equipment standards. Consolidated the Places to Play database.
Jennifer Dawson	2023	Competitor	South Korea	San Diego, CA	The first ever triple crown winner, winning singles, doubles and mixed doubles in the 2017 Minto US Open.
Mark Friedenberg	2017	Contributor & Competitor	United States	Hollywood, CA	Co-founder and first president of USAP. Former owner of Pro-Lite Sports. Author of The Official Pickleball Handbook and Winning Pickleball. Maintained an outstanding competitive record over more than 25 years.
Daniel Gabanek	2019	Competitor	Czechoslovakia	Bratislava	Dominant men's player between 1988 and 2014 when he was ranked #1 nationally in men's singles, earning 21 gold medals. He was also ranked #1 in men's doubles winning about 60 gold medals. A four-time national champion and four-time runner up.
Wes Gabrielsen	2022	Competitor	United States	Salem, OR	Winner of 11 USAPA National titles and 6 Canadian National Championships, including the triple crown in 2015. Founding member of the International Pickleball Teaching Professional Association (IPTPA).
John Gullo	2024	Contributor	United States		Known as "The father of professional pickleball" and founder of the Professional Pickleball Federation and the Tournament of Champions.
Jim Hackenberg	2020	Competitor	United States	Kalamazoo, MI	Former USA Pickleball Ambassador and rules committee member. Founding member of IPTPA. President of Kalamazoo Pickleball Outreach.
Yvonne Hackenberg	2021	Competitor	United States	Kalamazoo, MI	Founding member of IPTPA. Co-founder of Kalamazoo Pickleball Outreach and the PHOF. Numerous National and Regional pickleball titles.
Alex Hamner	2020	Competitor	United States	Loma Linda, CA	Co-author of "Around the Post" column in Pickleball Magazine. Tournament commentator and contributor to the PickleballChannel. Founding member of the IPTPA. 2014 Pickleball Rocks player of the year.
Earl Hill	2018	Contributor	Canada	Arborfield, Saskatchewan	Original member of the USAPA Board. Founded the Ambassador program. Multiyear USAPA National Champion, winning gold in Men's Doubles three times between 2009 and 2014.
Billy Jacobsen	2017	Competitor	United States	Seattle, WA	Contributed to the development of early rules, especially pertaining to tournaments.
Simone Jardim	2024	Competitor	Brazil	Santa Maria, Rio Grande do Sul	A dominant women's professional player from 2016 to 2023, including two triple crowns.
Pat Kane	2022	Competitor	United States	San Diego, CA	A dominant men's player from 1991 to 2019. Winner of over 288 medals, including 15 Nationals titles. Helped develop the original USAPA rulebook.
Robert (Bob) Lanius	2018	Contributor	United States	Dallas, TX	Created the software that supports the PickleballTournaments.com website and created one of the first pickleball club websites featuring news, places to play and tournaments.
Gigi LeMaster	2021	Competitor	Belgium		USA Pickleball Ambassador and Certified Referee. Many years participating and contributing to various pickleball training and tournament activities support activities.
Jennifer Lucore	2019	Competitor	United States	California	A dominant women's player between 2010 and 2019, winning 17 USAPA Nationals gold, 11 Canadian nationals, and numerous other national and international titles. Co-authored with Beverly Youngren, History of Pickleball – More Than 50 Years of Fun!.
Cammy MacGregor	2025	Competitor	United States	Torrance, CA	Dominant women's player from 2018 to 2022 with 22 major championship titles in doubles and singles. Started a premier pickleball net company with her husband Darrin Ward, providing nets for the APP, PPA, and other major pickleball tournaments.
Hilary Hilton Marold	2020	Competitor	United States	Pacific Palisades, CA	Helped spread the sport internationally. Founding member of the Professional Pickleball Federation in 2015. Contributing member to the World Pickleball Federation.
Barney McCallum	2017	Contributor	United States	Davenport, WA	One of the three original developers of the sport.
Melissa McCurley	2025	Contributor	United States	Tyler, TX	Acquired tournament management system "Pickleballtournaments.com" from Bob Lanius in 2014 and developed it into a model to manage tournaments worldwide.
Chris Miller	2025	Conmpetitor	United States	Palo Alto, CA	Dominant player for over 30 years starting from the 1990s, with over 100 career titles including 10 USAP National Championships, 3 Canadian National wins, and is a 2023 National Pickleball League champion.
Larry Moon	2022	Competitor	United States	Coalinga, CA	Sixteen-time Nationals champion. Triple crown winner in 2016 and 2017.
Scott Moore	2023	Competitor	United States	Fort Worth, TX	Won the USA Pickleball National Championship in 12 consecutive events from 2015 to 2017. A 12-time US Open Champion, 7-time Senior Pro triple crown winner, and a 10-time Tournament of Champions winner. Co-founded Pickleball Trips and the High Performance Pickleball Academy. First player to ever win Senior Pro and Super Senior Pro Gold medals in the same tournament at the 2022 Mesa APP Open.
Fran Myer	2018	Contributor	United States	Seattle, WA	Original member of the USAPA Board. Created Pickleball Stuff, the first website to sell pickleball equipment from all vendors. Co-directed the first three USAPA National Tournaments from 2009 to 2011. Won over 200 medals, including age group silver medals at USAPA Nationals for Singles in 2012, 2016, and 2025, bronze in Singles in 2021, USAPA National Mixed Doubles Champion in 2009 and a 3-time gold medalist at the National Senior Games.
Arlen Paranto	2017	Contributor	United States	Mott, ND	Developed the first lightweight non-wood composite paddle.
Steve Paranto	2019	Contributor	United States	Seattle, WA	Co-developer of the first non-wood composite paddle. Competed at the Open 5.0 level from 1974 to 2019, longer than any other play. Taught, Coached, and directed tournaments for over 30 years.
Joel Pritchard	2017	Contributor	United States	Seattle, WA	Inventor and "Father of Pickleball".
Seymour Rifkind	2023	Contributor	United States	Riverwoods, IL	Founder of the Pickleball Hall of Fame and the first teaching organization in the sport of pickleball, the International Pickleball Teaching Professional Association (IPTPA). Rifkind also founded the World Pickleball Federation, an International Governing Body for the sport.
Enrique Ruiz	2019	Competitor	Mexico	San Miguel, Sonora	Dominance in the sport for over 25 years. Ten-time national champion, five-time champion of international indoor championships and three-time winner of tournament of champions. Ambassador of the sport in the northwest for many years.
Sid Williams	2017	Contributor	United States	Tacoma, WA	In 1984, organized the U.S.A.P.A., the first governing body of pickleball. Standardized rules and created the first Rule Book. Promoted the growth of pickleball through tournaments from 1984 - 1995 that were held about ten times per year. Acquired Nalley Fine Food as the first pickleball sponsor.
Steve Wong	2021	Competitor	Cambodia	Phnom Penh	Helped organize USAPA in 2005 and served at first webmaster. Founded S-Type Sports, now Onix Sports. Established Armour Pickleball. Helped form Arizona's Surprise Pickleball Association in 2012.
Kyle Yates	2024	Competitor	United States	Fort Myers, FL	A dominant men's professional pickleball player from 2014 to 2018.
