= Catherine Parenteau =

Canadian professional pickleball player

- Full name: Catherine Parenteau
- Country (sports): Canada
- Residence: Naples, Florida, U.S.
- Born: August 26, 1994 (age 32) Montreal, Quebec, Canada
- Height: 5 ft 5 in (165 cm)
- Turned pro: 2016
- Plays: Right-handed
- College: University of Arkansas Michigan State University
- Official website: catherineparenteau.com

Catherine Parenteau (born August 26, 1994) is a Canadian professional pickleball player. As of December 29, 2024, she is ranked No. 4 in the world for Woman's Singles, No. 3 in the world for Woman's Doubles, and No. 5 in the world for Woman's Mixed Doubles by the Professional Pickleball Association (PPA).

== Personal life ==
Parenteau was born in Montreal, Canada on August 26, 1994. She grew up in Montreal, being introduced to tennis at the young age of 4. She would attend the Félix-Leclerc secondary school in 2006 where she would continue to grow her skill and passion in tennis, graduating from the school in 2011. Her dedication would prove successful when she was recruited by the University of Arkansas's (UA) 1 NCAA tennis team in 2011, but would later transfer to Michigan State University (MSU) where she would continue her tennis career as a member of the MSU Women's Tennis Team and her major in pre-veterinary medicine, graduating in 2015.

As of August 2023, Parenteau resides in Naples, Florida with her wife Athena Trouillot.

== Pickleball career ==
In 2015, Parenteau was introduced to pickleball by her now former MSU tennis coach, Simone Jardim, and instantly took a liking to the sport and began to practice it. Around 6 months later, she competed in the US Open where she won the 5.0 mixed bracket, beginning her career as a professional pickleball player. She has played and won multiple tournaments, such as the 2021 US Open in the Pro Women's Doubles division with her partner Callie Smith. She is currently a three times US Open champion and has 16 PPA Tour titles to her name. Parenteau is also an IPTPA-certified instructor, and serves as an instructor at the Collier’s Reserve in Naples, Florida.

As of August 2023, she was sponsored by Selkirk and Skechers in the PPA.

In 2023, she received her PPA Tour "Gold Card" and will be competing in the PPA Tour and the Major League Pickleball Tour (MLP).

== Business endeavors ==
Parenteau started her own brand called "CP" which sells apparel, water bottles, pickleball paddles, and tour bags with the help of companies Takeya and Selkirk.
