= Kyle Yates =

American pickleball player (born 1995)

Kyle Yates is an American pickleball player. He was one of the most dominant men's pickleball players from 2014 to 2018 and in recognition of his achievements was inducted into the Pickleball Hall of Fame in 2024.

== Early life ==
Kyle Yates was born in Florida on 11th April 1995. As a child, he was an active athlete who played tennis at school. When Yates was a teenager, his uncle introduced him to the sport of pickleball.

== Career ==
In 2014 at age 19, Yates competed in his first USA Pickleball (USAPA) National Tournament and won gold in the men's doubles 19+ division.

He won the grand slam of men's pro doubles in 2016: the US Open, Tournament of Champions, and the USAPA Nationals. He won six US Open pro doubles titles, and was named World Pickleball Federation (WPF) #1 ranked doubles player in 2018.

In recognition of his accomplishments in the sport of pickleball, Yates was inducted into the Pickleball Hall of Fame on November 14, 2024, at the USA Pickleball Nationals Tournament in Mesa, Arizona.
