= Ben Johns =

American professional pickleball player

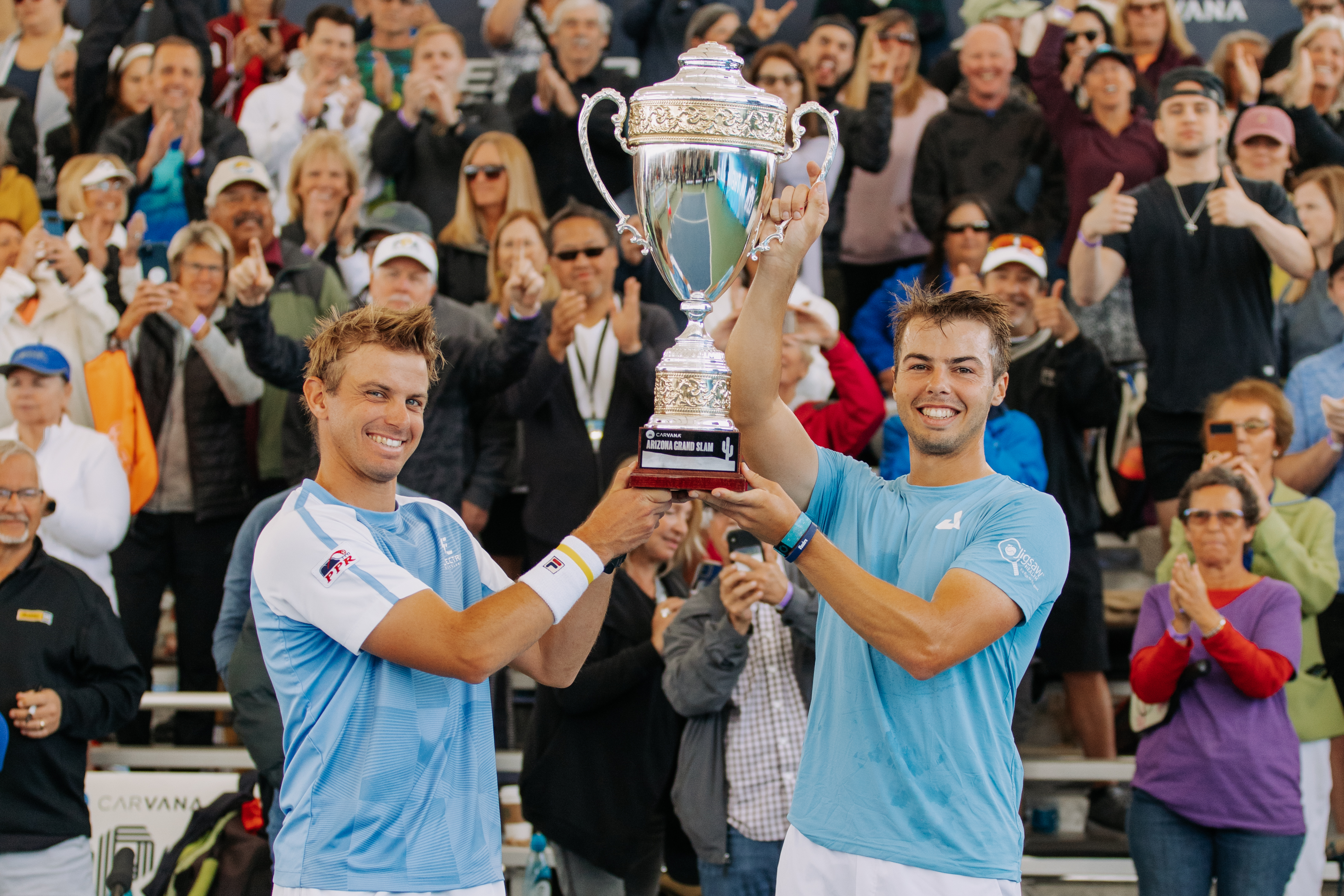
- Ben Johns (right), alongside his brother, Collin Johns (left), after winning the Men's Doubles title at the PPA Carvana Arizona Grand Slam Presented by Hyundai in February 2023
- Country (sports): United States
- Residence: Boca Raton, Florida, U.S.
- Born: March 18, 1999 (age 27), Gaithersburg, Maryland
- Height: 6 ft 1 in (185 cm)
- Turned pro: 2016
- Plays: Right-handed (one-handed backhand)
- College: University of Maryland

Benjamin Ellingham Johns (born March 18, 1999) is an American professional pickleball player. As of April 2026, he is ranked No. 1 in the world for mixed doubles, No. 13 for singles, and No. 1 for men's doubles by the Pro Pickleball Association (PPA). His current DUPR rating is 7.121.

== Early life and family ==
Johns was raised in Laytonsville, Maryland. He was homeschooled as a child and graduated from the University of Maryland with a materials science and engineering degree. His elder brother Collin is also a highly ranked professional pickleball player and Johns's former doubles partner.

== Pickleball career ==
Johns played tennis and table tennis as a child, showing some proficiency in both sports and helping his older brother Collin train for the pro tennis circuit. He first played pickleball in 2016 at the age of 17 while vacationing in Florida and took fifth place in Men's Pro Singles at the U.S. Open Pickleball Championships just a few months later. He began to play in tournaments consistently and earned his first gold medal at the Riverbend RV Resort Pickleball Tournament a little less than a year later. That same year, he returned to the U.S. Open and took gold in Men's Pro Singles. Shortly thereafter, he won three gold medals at the Canadian Nationals, bringing him to the forefront of the sport.

In 2019, he became the first male professional player to win a triple crown (gold medal in all three events) at one of the world's three major pickleball events when he captured it at the Tournament of Champions in Brigham City, Utah. He followed up this achievement by winning the triple crown at the U.S. Open in both 2021 and 2022. Ben has accumulated over 80 titles on the PPA Tour, 15 of which were triple crowns. In 2019, Johns recorded a 108-match winning streak in singles and remained undefeated in mixed doubles for 22 consecutive tournaments.[5]

On October 8, 2021, Johns appeared on Live with Kelly And Ryan alongside his brother Collin, in a match set up outside of the show's New York City studio.

=== Notable partnerships ===
As of the Red Rock Open 2024, Johns had achieved sustained success on the PPA tour with the following partners:

- Anna Leigh Waters – 31 PPA gold medals
- Collin Johns – 31 PPA gold medals
- Gabriel Tardio – 15 PPA gold medals
- Simone Jardim – 12 PPA gold medals
- Matt Wright – 8 PPA gold medals

In 2025 Johns paired up with Gabriel Tardio on the PPA Tour in men's doubles.

As of the Bristol Open of August 2025, they have reached championship Sunday in every event where they have played together as a fixed partnership, losing only twice (to finish with silver instead of gold). On the basis of this stretch, As of the Bristol Open, Tardio holds the number two seed in the PPA men's doubles bracket.

Johns' continued partnership in mixed doubles with Anna Leigh Waters has been comparably productive in 2025, through to the Bristol Open.

== Sponsorships and collaborations ==
In 2019, he signed a sponsorship deal with Franklin Sports which lasted for 3 years.

On April 1, 2022, he signed a new partnership collaboration with JOOLA Pickleball, a global sporting goods company based in Rockville, MD, near where he grew up. He collaborated with JOOLA to design and produce the JOOLA Ben Johns Hyperion CFS 16 pickleball paddle.

== See also ==
- List of professional pickleball players
