= Simone Jardim =

American professional pickleball player

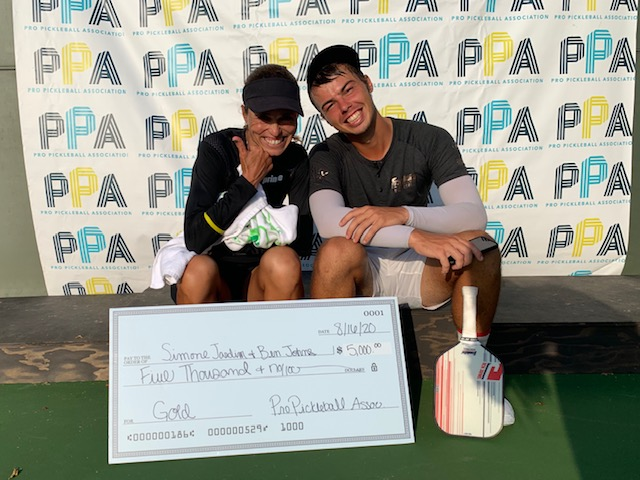
- Simone with her former mixed doubles partner, Ben Johns
- Country (sports): Brazil, United States
- Residence: Naples, Florida
- Born: November 7, 1979 (age 46) Santa Maria, Brazil
- Height: 5 ft 8 in (173 cm)
- Turned pro: 2015
- Plays: Right-handed (two-handed backhand)
- College: Fresno State University

Singles
- Highest ranking: No.1

Grand Slam singles results
- US Open: W 2016, 2017, 2018, 2019

Doubles
- Highest ranking: No. 1

Grand Slam doubles results
- US Open: W 2017, 2018, 2023

Grand Slam mixed doubles results
- US Open: W 2017, 2018, 2019, 2021

Simone Jardim (Brazilian Portuguese pronunciation: [simɔni ʒardʒim]) (born November 7, 1979) is a Brazilian-American professional pickleball player. Jardim was ranked the number one woman player in the world from 2016 to 2020. She won the women's singles division of the Minto U.S. Open Pickleball Championships four consecutive years and is a two-time triple crown winner of the U.S. Open Pickleball Championships, winning in singles, women's doubles and mixed doubles in 2017 and 2018. For a time, Jardim held the record for the most women's Pro Pickleball Association titles with 32. Jardim is also a former All-American collegiate tennis player and was the head tennis coach at Michigan State University from 2009 to 2016. She is considered by many to be the original, greatest of all time, female player, in the sport of pickleball. In 2024, she was inducted into the Pickleball Hall of Fame.

== Early life ==
Jardim was born and raised in Santa Maria, Brazil. She moved to the United States at 18 years of age to play tennis for Auburn University. After two years, she transferred to Fresno State University where she was a two-time All-American in women's doubles tennis. In 2003, she graduated from Fresno State with a BA degree in Mass Communication and Journalism.

== Tennis career ==
After college, Jardim worked for three years as an assistant tennis coach at Fresno State University during which time the team had a 58–20 record, won three WAC conference championships and finished her third year ranked at number 20 in the nation. In 2008, Jardim became the assistant coach for the College of William & Mary tennis team and was named interim head coach at the end of the season. In 2009, she became the head tennis coach at Michigan State University and coached for 8 seasons. During her tenure, the MSU team achieved two of its three most successful seasons: with records of 17–9 in 2014 and 16–9 in 2015. In 2016, Jardim resigned as head coach in order to relocate with her family to Florida.

== Pickleball career ==
Jardim became a professional pickleball player in 2015 and took up it up full-time in 2016 after moving to Florida. That year, Jardim won her first U.S. Open pickleball championship in women's singles. In 2017 and 2018, she won the U.S. Open triple crown with titles in singles, doubles and mixed doubles. At the 2019 U.S. Open championships, Jardim won the singles title (against Irene Tereschenko) and mixed doubles with Kyle Yates.

At the 2021 U.S. Open, she was the runner-up in women's doubles and won the mixed doubles title. Until 2021, she held the most career PPA titles among women players with 32 and was ranked No. 1 in the world in women's doubles and mixed doubles by the Pro Pickleball Association (PPA). In 2023, Jardim again won the doubles title at the U.S. Open and was named Player of the Year for Female Pro Doubles by the Association of Pickleball Players.

Jardim is co-founder and co-director of Peak Performance Pickleball Academy in Bonita Springs, Florida. In 2021, she had sponsor endorsements from several sports and health companies including JOOLA, Jigsaw Health and Nike. Many in the sport consider her to be the original, greatest of all time, female player.

== Personal life ==
Jardim lives in Naples, Florida. She is married to Chad Edwards with whom she has two children.
