= Anna Leigh Waters =

American professional pickleball player

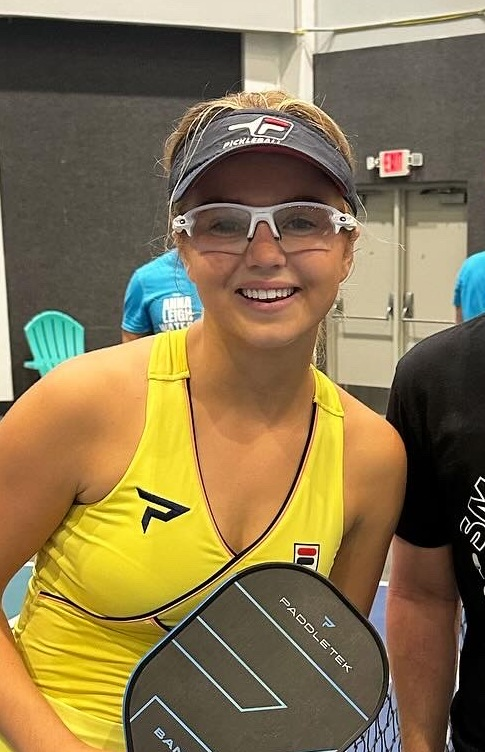
- Anna Leigh Waters in 2024

Personal information
- Born: January 26, 2007 (age 19) Allentown, Pennsylvania, U.S.
- Home town: Clinton, North Carolina

Sport
- Country: United States
- Sport: Pickleball
- Handedness: Right-handed
- Team: New Jersey 5s
- Turned pro: 2019
- Partner: Leigh Waters

Anna Leigh Waters (born January 26, 2007) is an American professional pickleball player. She is widely regarded as the number one female player in the sport. As of October 2026, she had won 202 PPA National Championship medals, 45 triple crowns, and was ranked No. 1 in the world for doubles, mixed doubles, and singles by the Professional Pickleball Association. She was the youngest professional pickleball player in history at age 12, and is known for playing doubles on a team with her mother. Her doubles DUPR rating is currently 6.882.

== Early life and education ==
Anna Leigh Waters was born on January 26, 2007 to a family of athletes with her mother being a South Carolina Gamecocks tennis player and her father being a golfer. Her grandfather, Neil Eichelberger was a Chicago Cubs MLB draft pick. Anna Leigh herself had tried tennis and soccer in her childhood.

Anna Leigh Waters was born in Allentown, Pennsylvania but moved to Clinton, North Carolina where she lived there with her family until she was eight years old. In 2015 they relocated to Delray Beach, Florida until they moved back to Pennsylvania after Hurricane Irma hit the state.

Anna Leigh was homeschooled by her grandmother but was reportedly taking online schooling in 2023.

== Pickleball career ==
When the Waters family evacuated North Carolina to Pennsylvania in 2017 during Hurricane Irma, Anna Leigh Waters and her mother Leigh was introduced to the sport of pickleball by the younger Waters' grandfather Neil Eichelberger. The mother-daughter were initially skeptical of trying the sport.

The younger Waters played in her first tournament several months later and, at 10 years old, won a gold medal in women's doubles with her mother. By 2019, at age 12, Waters won her first national title and became the youngest professional pickleball player in history. Since then Waters has won almost two hundred tournaments in doubles, mixed doubles, and singles.

Waters's mother remained to be her coach and occasional doubles partner. They are the only mother-daughter team in professional pickleball. In 2022, Waters and her mother were in the first nationally televised pickleball match in history on CBS Sports, at the Skechers Invitational Summer Championship in Los Angeles. Waters has also played exhibition style games with many pro athletes including swimmer Michael Phelps, actor Jamie Foxx, boxer Sugar Ray Leonard, golfers Scottie Scheffler, Jordan Spieth, and football players Larry Fitzgerald and Danny Wuerffel. As of 2023, Waters was trained by Brandon Oakes and Jack Llewellyn.

In the Major League Pickleball, Waters was a number one draft pick and plays for the New Jersey 5s.

Waters plays with an aggressive style, characterized by strength and speed. She is represented by Octagon, signed with Franklin Sports as of 8 January 2026, and is the first pickleball athlete to be signed with Nike in a multi-year deal.
