= Pickleball in Australia =

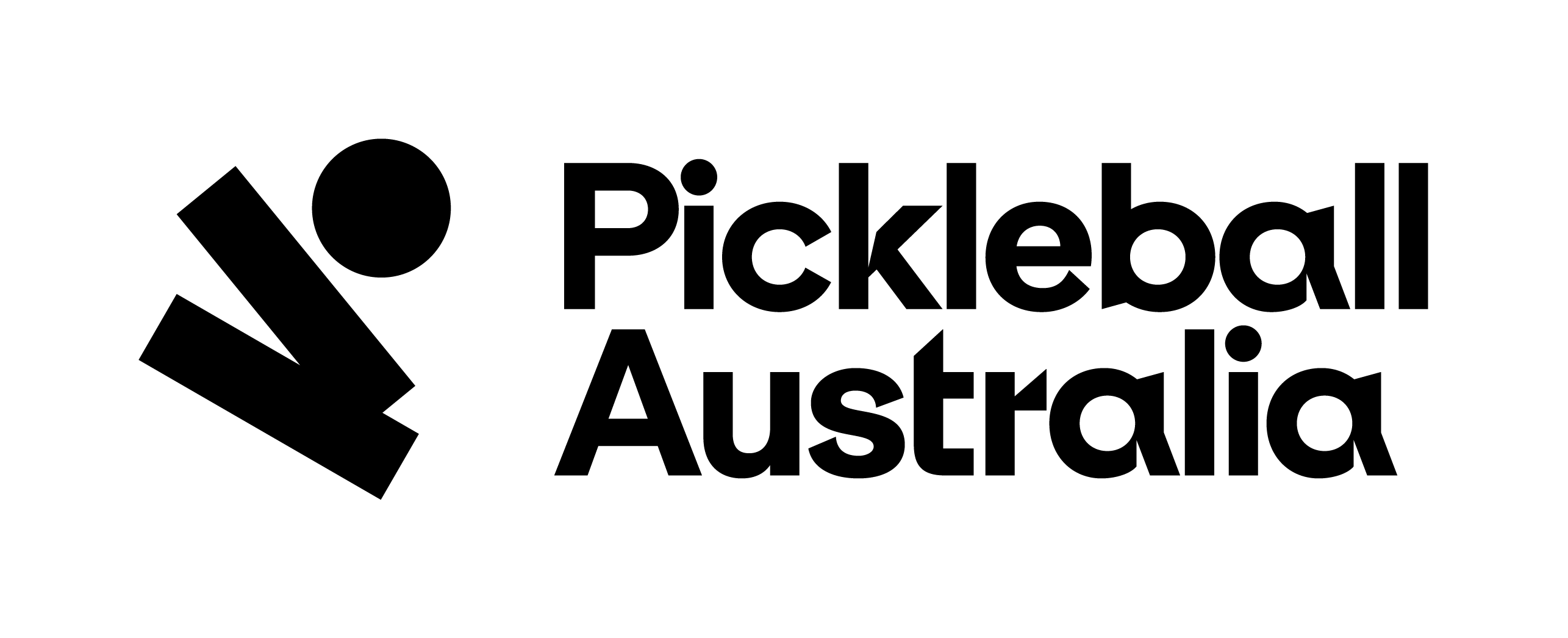
- Governing body: Pickleball Australia Association
- Nickname: PAA
- First played: 2010
- Registered players: 27,974 As of 29 June 2026
- Clubs: 425

Pickleball, a paddle sport that combines elements of tennis, badminton, and table tennis, was invented in the United States in 1965, on Bainbridge Island, Washington. Labeled the fastest growing sport in the United States since 2021, the sport is rapidly gaining popularity in Australia.

In September 2024 AusPlay, a report issued by Australia's Clearinghouse for Sport, in coordination with the Australian Sports Commission, found that as of June 2024 over 92,000 Australians had played the sport in the previous year. Trilogy Funds, the title sponsor for the 2024 Australian pickleball championships, declared pickleball as, "Australia's fastest growing sport".

== History ==
The first time pickleball is known to have been played in Australia was in 2010 in the Sunshine Coast Region of Queensland, but it wasn't until 2015 that the sport started to be taken more seriously. The first purpose-built Australian pickleball courts were installed in 2016, in Caboolture, Queensland, with the first pickleball association, the Pickleball Association of Australia (PAA), formed in 2017. The original Pickleball Association of Australia was renamed the Pickleball Association of Queensland (PAQ) in 2020, when a new Pickleball Association of Australia was formed to act as the national governing body for Australia.

From January 24th to the 26th, at the end of the 2025 Australian Open tennis tournament, the Australian Open (AO) held its first AO Pickleball Slam tournament with one hundred thousand dollars in prize money.

The 2025 Trilogy Funds Australian Pickleball Championships (APC), held on September 29th to October 4th, held a record 1235 players, establishing the APC as the largest pickleball tournament outside of the US.

Team Australia, organized by Pickleball Australia, competed in the 2025 Pickleball World Cup. This was the first international team sent by Australia to compete on the world stage.

== Governing body ==
The Pickleball Australia Association (PAA), a not-for-profit organization, was formed in 2020 to act as a nationwide governing body for pickleball. The PAA held its first Pickleball Australia State Member Strategy Conference in February 2025.

The PAA state members include the following subnational organizations

- Australia Capital Territory - Pickleball Association of the Australian Capital Territory (PACT)
- New South Wales - Pickleball Association New South Wales (PANSW)
- Queensland - Pickleball Association of Queensland (PAQ)
- South Australia - Pickleball South Australia Association (PSAA)
- Tasmania - Pickleball Association Tasmania (PAT)
- Victoria - Pickleball Victoria (PV)
- Western Australia - Pickleball Association of Western Australia (PAWA)

The following reflects the pickleball-related statistics reported in Pickleball Australia's Annual Reports.

Report year	PAA members	Female members	Male members	Avg member age	Players nationwide
2019/2020	967				
2020/2021	2,000+				
2021/2022	3,800+	57%	42%	59	12,000+
2022/2023	7,300+	55%	44%	57	25,000+
2023/2024	15,166	53.7%	45.8%	56	92,641
2024/2025	22,209	53.3%	46.2%	56	155,000

=== Rating system ===
A rating system assigns each player an individual score based on their skill level. Their skill level can be assessed by evaluating the player against a standard table of progressively harder skills, or assigned using an algorithm based on actual game results. In March 2025 the PAA announced that the Dynamic Universal Pickleball Rating system (DUPR), would be the official rating system for all PAA sanctioned tournaments.

=== Ranking system ===
A ranking system lists all players, or teams, in a hierarchical order based on accumulated points they earn at each tournament they play. In 2024 the PAA implemented its first nation-wide pickleball ranking system and revised it in 2025. Each PAA sanctioned tournament is assigned a tier level, 1 through 6, and each tier level awards points to players based on their placement in the tournament. The higher the tier, the more points that are available.

== Professional pickleball tours and leagues ==
=== National Pickleball League Australia ===
The National Pickleball League Australia (NPLA) was established in January 2023, with its inaugural tournament held in July 2023 on the Gold Coast. The NPLA's first full season started in March 2024 with 18 teams across 3 states, each team having 6 players (3 men and 3 women). The competitions consisted of a specialized team format called NPLeague with a total prize of $100,000. The finals for season 1 were held in June 2023 with the Jalapenos of Victoria winning the $50,000 top prize. The Season 2 NPLA finals was won by the Queensland Caterpillars in November 2024.

On October 23, 2024, it was announced that the NPLA would be the exclusive Oceania league and tournament provider for Pickleball World Rankings (PWR). NPLA tournaments will be incorporated into the PWR World Tour where participants can earn points to qualify for the PWR World Series.

=== Major League Pickleball Australia ===
Pacific Pickleball, and the Pacific Pickleball League, were founded by Adam Thompson and Anthony Liveris. In September 2023, shortly after the Pacific Pickleball League was established, the organization worked out a cooperative agreement with Major League Pickleball in the United States, and the Pacific Pickleball League was rebranded Major League Pickleball Australia (MLPA). All games are played following the MLP team format established by the MLP in the United States. Pacific Pickleball continued to operate the Australian Open and Masters pickleball tournaments following the traditional tour format.

=== PPA Tour Australia ===
In February 2024 the Pacific Pickleball organization was itself rebranded as the PPA Tour Australia after reaching an official partnership with the Professional Pickleball Association Tour in the United States.

== Other tournaments ==
=== Australian Pickleball Championships ===
The Australian Pickleball Championships (APC) have been held since 2018, except 2020 and 2021, when the event was cancelled due to the COVID-19 pandemic. This is the largest gathering of pickleball players in Australia, and is the biggest pickleball tournament in the Southern Hemisphere.

In 2025, Pickleball Australia announced that prize money would be awarded for the first time, with a $30,000 prize pool.

=== AO Pickleball Slam ===
Professional pickleball made its first appearance at the Australian Open in 2025 with a $100,000 prize purse. The invitational tournament had a total of 24 players, including many of Australia's top pros, as well as select international players. A team-based format with two men and two women on each team was used, with a total of six teams. Team names were selected from Melbourne's most popular laneways.

Final result	Team name & color	Male players	Female players
1st place	Hosier - Pink	Joseph Wild (AUS), Harrison Brown (AUS)	Michaela Haet (AUS), Nicola Schoeman (AUS)
2nd place	Guildford - Green	Zach Taylor (USA), George Wall (AUS)	Roos van Reek (NLD), Caroline Dhenin (FRA)
3rd place	Finders - Charcoal	Armann Bhatia (IND), Lucas Pascoe (AUS)	Danni-Elle Townsend (AUS), Selina Turulja (AUS)

== Popular culture ==
In 2024 Australia-owned Moose Toys began selling Pickleball Blast, a table-top game inspired by the sport of pickleball. The two-player children's game requires players to use a hand-held mechanical paddle to hit a plastic pickle back and forth over a net while trying to flip the lids of the opponent's pickle jars.

== Pickleball Rules In Australia ==
Pickleball in Australia is governed by the Pickleball Australia Association (PAA), which aligns its rules and regulations with the Global Pickleball Federation's standards. The official rules are detailed in their Pickleball Rulebook, accessible through the PAA's website. You can also find a more simple guide to pickleball rules in Australia on the PAA's website.
